= L'Enfant Plaza station =

Washington Metro and VRE station

L'Enfant Plaza
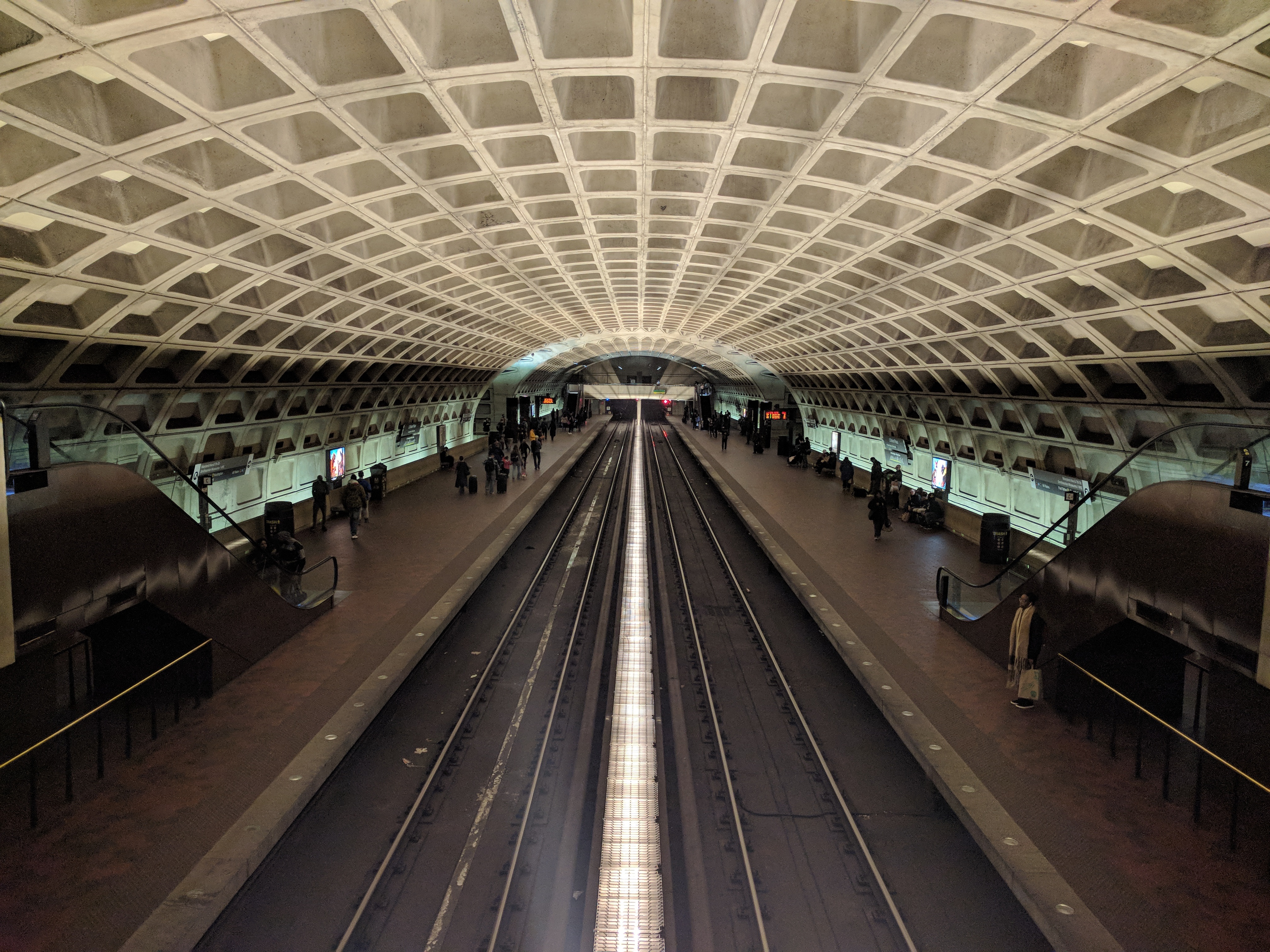
- The Green and Yellow Line upper level platforms facing south in March 2019

General information
- Location: 600 Maryland Avenue SW; Washington, D.C.
- Coordinates: 38.884775°N 77.021964°W
- Owner: Washington Metropolitan Area Transit Authority
- Line: RF&P Subdivision (VRE station)
- Platforms: 2 side platforms (upper level); 1 island platform (lower level); 1 side platform (VRE)
- Tracks: Metro: 4 (2 upper level, 2 lower level); RF&P Subdivision: 3
- Connections: Metrobus: A40, C11, C55, D30, D40, D50, D60; Fairfax Connector: 697; MTA Maryland Commuter Bus; Loudoun County Transit; PRTC OmniRide; Ride Smart Northern Shenandoah Valley

Construction
- Platform levels: 2
- Cycle facilities: Capital Bikeshare
- Accessible: Yes

Other information
- Station code: F03 (Metro upper level); D03 (Metro lower level)
- Fare zone: Zone 1 (VRE)

History
- Opened: July 1, 1977 (Metro); June 22, 1992 (VRE)

Passengers
- 2025: 13,852 (average weekday) (Metro)
- Rank: 5 of 98 (Metro)

Services
Preceding station	Virginia Railway Express	Following station
Crystal City toward Spotsylvania	Fredericksburg Line	Union Station Terminus
Crystal City toward Broad Run	Manassas Line	Union Station Terminus
Preceding station	Washington Metro	Following station
Pentagon toward Huntington	Yellow Line	Archives toward Mount Vernon Square or Greenbelt
Waterfront toward Branch Avenue	Green Line	Archives toward Greenbelt
Smithsonian toward Vienna	Orange Line	Federal Center SW toward New Carrollton
Smithsonian toward Ashburn	Silver Line	Federal Center SW toward Downtown Largo or New Carrollton
Smithsonian toward Franconia–Springfield	Blue Line	Federal Center SW toward Downtown Largo
Former services (at 7th Street)
Preceding station	Richmond, Fredericksburg and Potomac Railroad	Following station
Alexandria toward Richmond: Broad Street or Main Street	Main Line	Washington, D.C. Terminus
Proposed services
Preceding station	MARC	Following station
Crystal City toward Alexandria	Penn Line	Union Station toward Perryville
Crystal City toward Alexandria	Brunswick Line	Union Station toward Martinsburg or Frederick
Route map
Location

L'Enfant Plaza station (/lɑːnˈfɑːnt/ lahn-FAHNT) is an intermodal transit station complex located at L'Enfant Plaza in the Southwest Federal Center neighborhood of Washington, D.C. It consists of an underground Washington Metro rapid transit station and an elevated Virginia Railway Express commuter rail station.

The Metro station, which opened on July 1, 1977, is one of four major interchange stations on the Metro system. It is the only station to serve five of the six Metro lines: the Green and Yellow lines with two side platforms on the upper level, and the Blue, Orange, and Silver lines with one island platform on the lower level. It was the seventh-busiest Metro stop in 2023, with an average of 7,506 daily passenger entries.

The VRE station, which has a single side platform serving the northernmost of the three tracks of the RF&P Subdivision, is served by the Manassas Line and Fredericksburg Line.

== Station layout ==
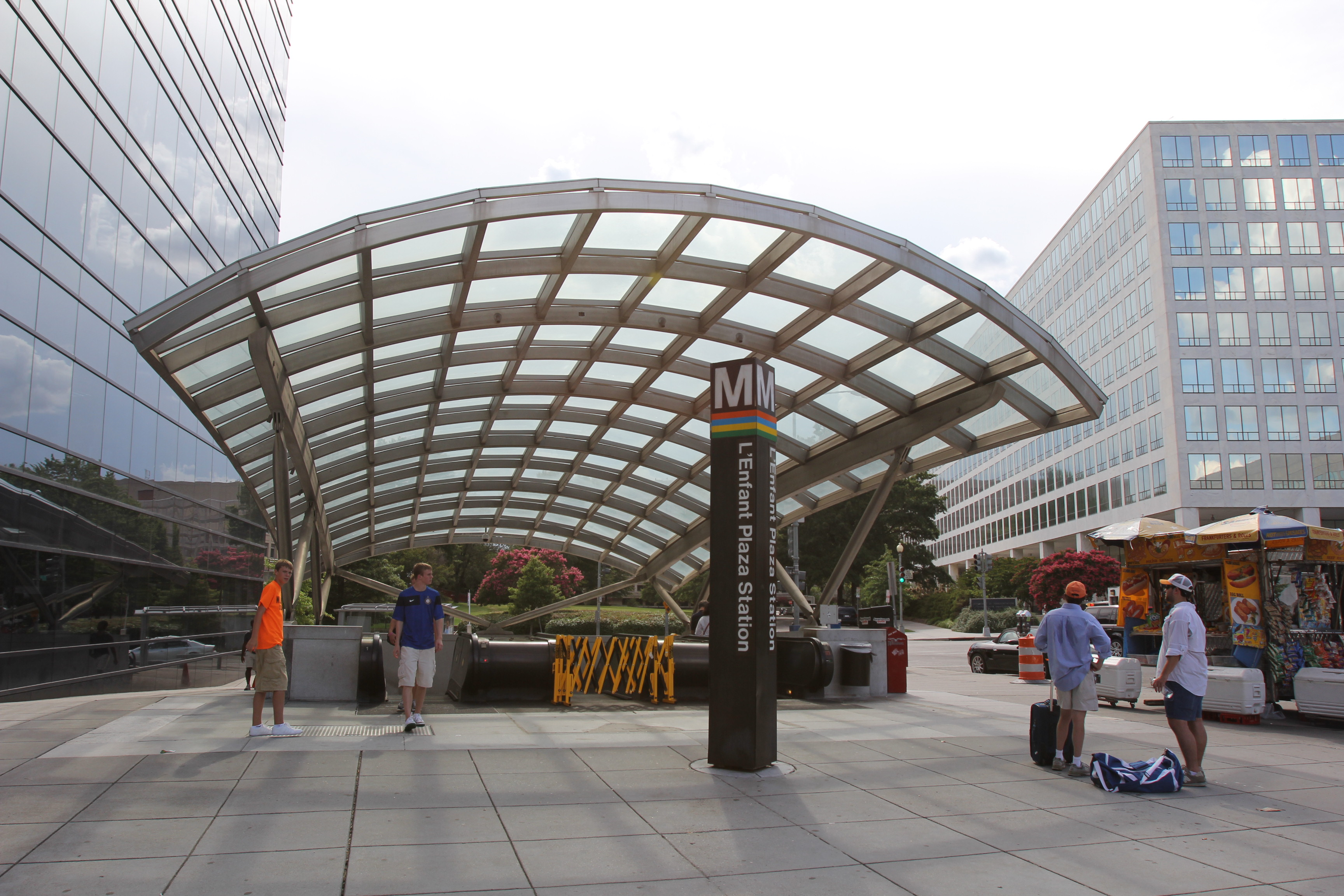
The 7th Street head house of the Metro station visually echoes the arched roof of the underground station

The station complex is located in the Southwest Federal Center area of Southwest, Washington, DC, centered around the intersection of 7th Street SW and D Street SW. The Metro station has three levels: a fare mezzanine, the Yellow/Green Line upper level with two side platforms, and the Orange/Blue/Silver Line lower level with one island platform. The north-south upper level stretches from C Street to E Street; the east-west lower level stretches from 9th Street to 6th Street. Metro entrances are located at the L'Enfant Plaza shopping mall concourse at 9th and D Streets, on D Street between 6th and 7th Streets, and at Maryland Avenue and 7th Street. Additional head houses may be eventually added.

The VRE platform is located on the north side of the three-track RF&P Subdivision, which is elevated above Virginia Avenue SW between 6th Street and 7th Street. Stairs lead to the station from 6th Street and 7th Street; a ramp leads to the station from C Street west of 7th Street. Most Amtrak intercity trains do not stop at L'Enfant, though several Northeast Regional trains stop for VRE passengers only as part of a ticket cross-honoring agreement.

== History ==
=== Metro station ===
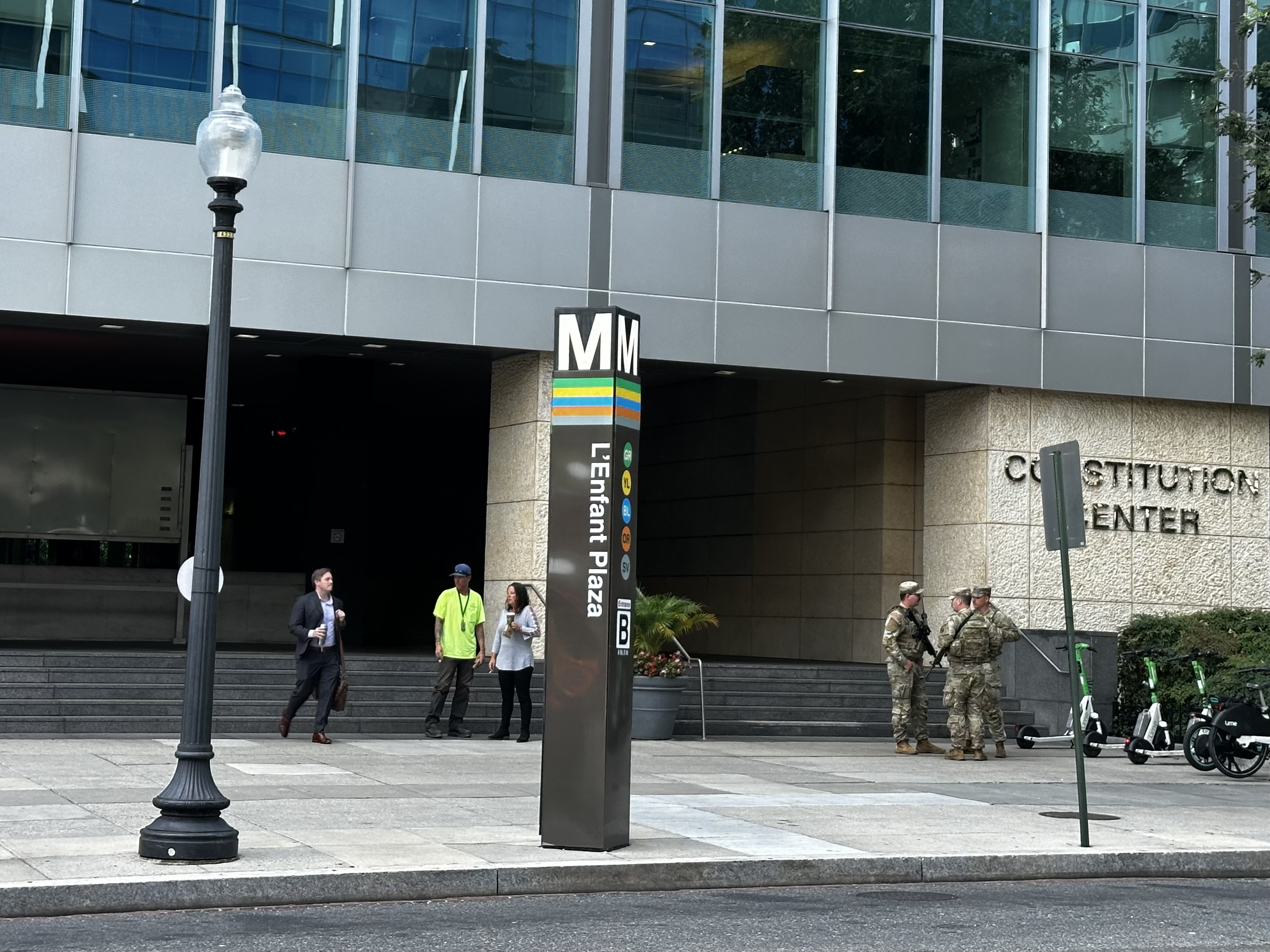
Armed National Guardsmen stand outside L'Enfant Plaza station during the 2025 deployment of federal forces to D.C.

The lower level of the Metro station opened on July 1, 1977, as part of the opening of 11.8 miles (19.0 km) of the Blue Line between National Airport and Stadium–Armory. Orange Line service began on November 20, 1978 when the extension to New Carrollton opened. The upper level opened with the opening of the Yellow Line on April 30, 1983; Green Line service began on May 11, 1991. Silver Line service on the lower level began on July 26, 2014. The Maryland Avenue entrance will be closed for about seven months beginning on May 9, 2022, for escalator replacement.

L'Enfant Plaza was the setting of a 2007 Pulitzer Prize–winning article by Washington Post reporter Gene Weingarten where world-famous classical violinist Joshua Bell performed outside the station at rush hour disguised as a street musician. On January 12, 2015, smoke appeared in the station during the afternoon rush hour, causing one death. A scene from the 2020 film Wonder Woman 1984 was filmed in the station in June 2018.

=== VRE station ===
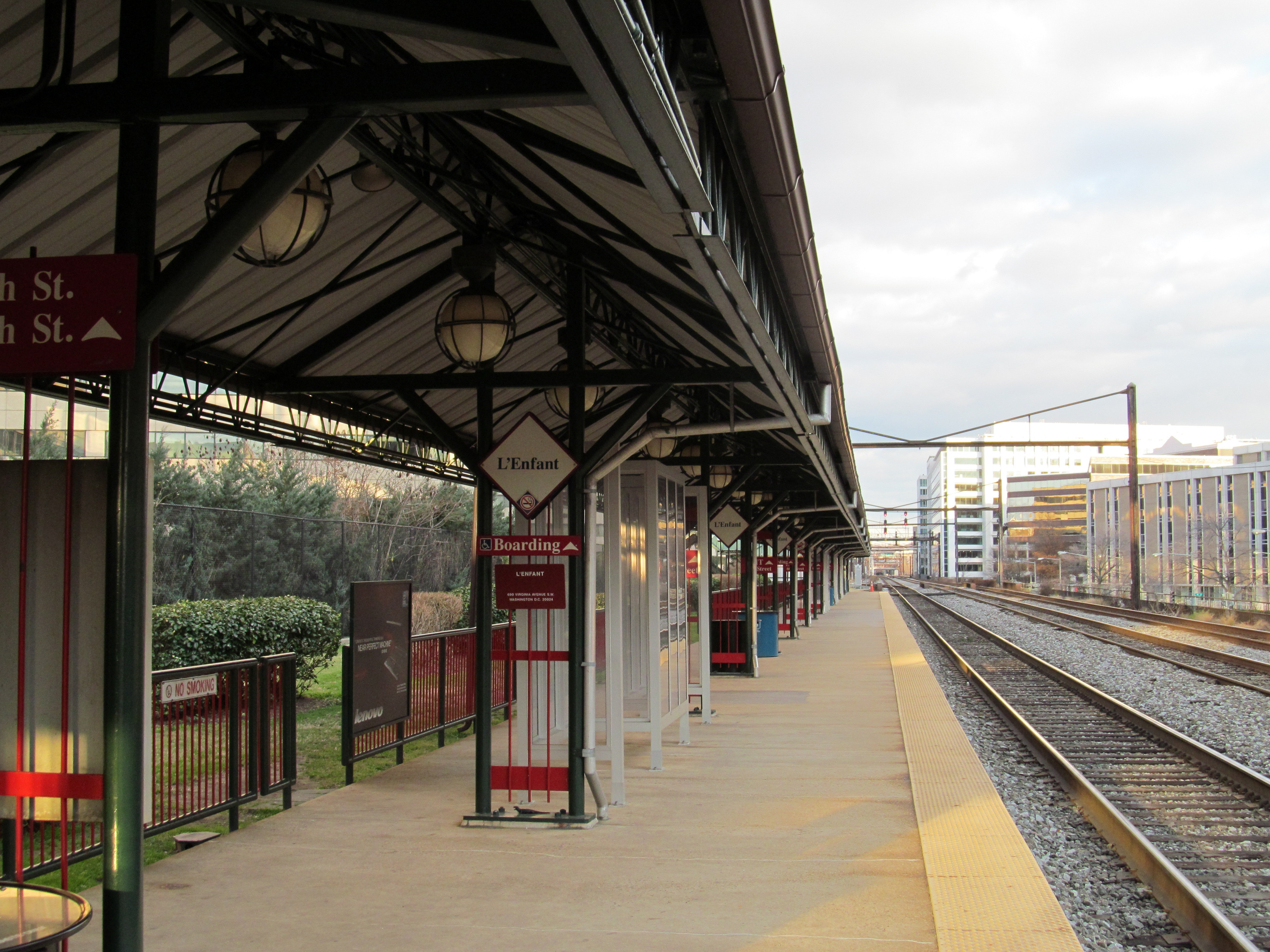
The VRE platform, which opened in 1992

Richmond, Fredericksburg and Potomac Railroad local service used a station at 7th Street until at least the mid-1950s. Virginia Railway Express (VRE) built a new station in the early 1990s. Manassas Line service began on June 22, 1992, followed by Fredericksburg Line service on July 20. L'Enfant is the northern terminus of 40% of trips on VRE. A 2010 city report analyzed options to expand the station, including the potential extension of MARC service from Union Station to L'Enfant or Alexandria. VRE began planning for an expansion of the station in 2021. The existing side platform will be replaced with an island platform to allow for increased service, with a fourth track added. As of 2025, construction is expected to take place from late 2027 to late 2029. The project received a $25 million federal grant in July 2026.
