= Potomac Shores station =

Potomac Shores
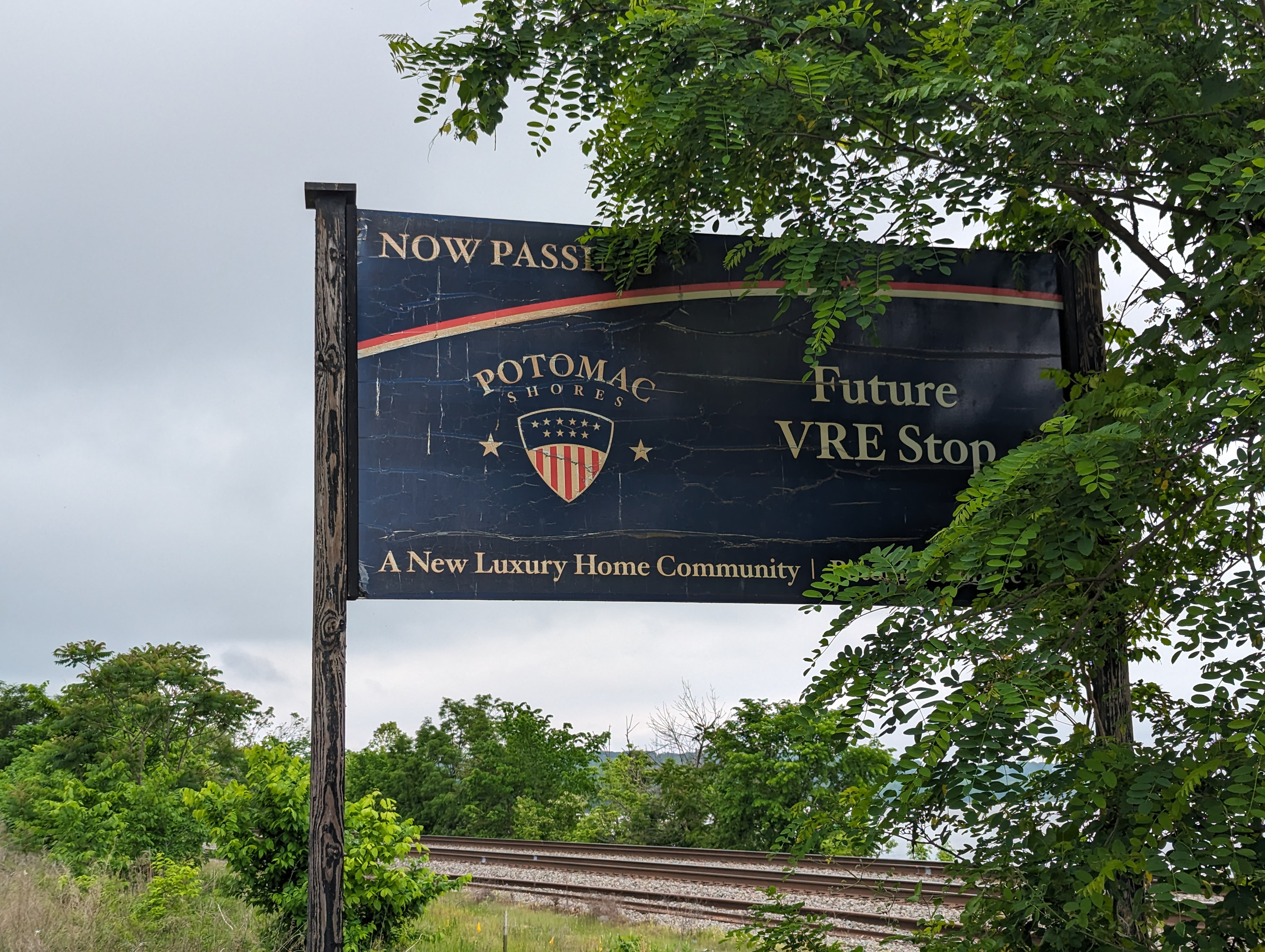
- Potomac Shores "Future VRE Station" trackside sign

General information
- Location: Dumfries, Virginia; United States
- Coordinates: 38°34′22″N 77°15′49″W
- Line: RF&P Subdivision (CSXT)
- Tracks: 2

Construction
- Accessible: Yes

History
- Opening: late 2020s (expected)

Planned services
Preceding station	Virginia Railway Express	Following station
Quantico toward Spotsylvania	Fredericksburg Line	Rippon toward Union Station
Location

Potomac Shores station is a planned Virginia Railway Express Fredericksburg Line infill station that will be located in Dumfries, Virginia. Construction was expected to begin in 2025.

== History ==
The station is planned to serve the Potomac Shores development. The station was first announced in 2013 with the approval of the development; it was originally planned to open in 2017. The design of the station has changed over the decade to accommodate planned expansions of the rail line (such as the new passenger bridge parallel to the existing Long Bridge) and VRE service. By April 2021, a construction contract was expected to be awarded in late 2021, with construction expected to take roughly eighteen months.

Construction on the adjacent parking garage began in May 2023. The three-level, 350-space below-grade garage was completed in late 2024. Groundbreaking for the station building on top of the garage took place in November 2024. As of November 2024, it was expected to be completed in late 2025. It will have retail tenants and provide access to the station. The station itself will not be constructed until the Virginia Passenger Rail Authority acquires land from CSX, which was expected to take place in 2025.
