= Woodbridge station (Virginia) =

Train station in Woodbridge, Virginia

Woodbridge
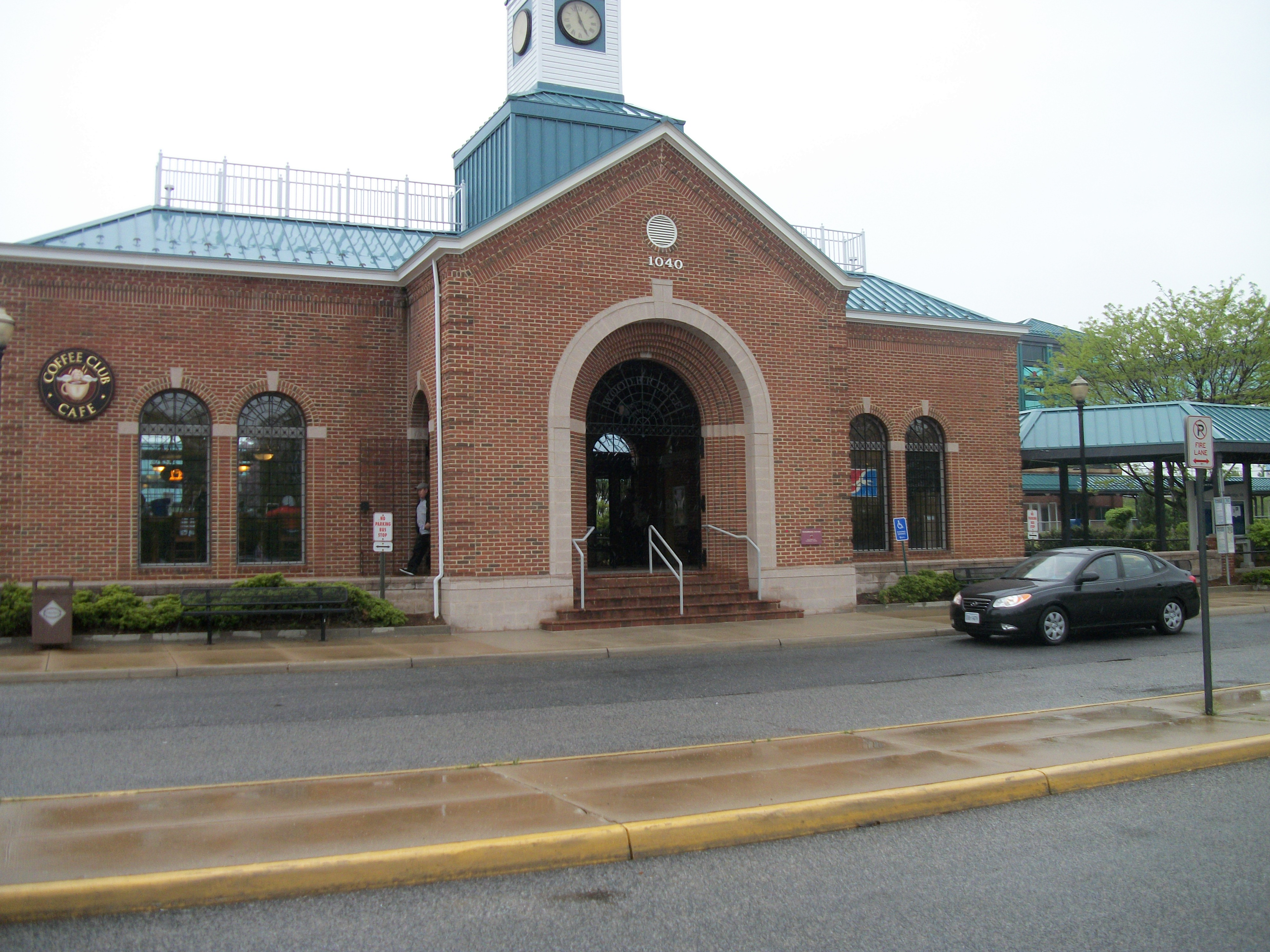
- Woodbridge station in April 2011

General information
- Location: 1040 Express Way; Woodbridge, Virginia; United States
- Coordinates: 38°39′33″N 77°14′53″W
- Owner: Virginia Railway Express
- Line: CSX RF&P Subdivision
- Platforms: 2 side platforms
- Tracks: 2
- Connections: OmniLink: R1, WL; OmniRide

Construction
- Parking: 738 spaces
- Cycle facilities: Racks
- Accessible: Yes

Other information
- Station code: Amtrak: WDB
- Fare zone: 5 (VRE)

History
- Opened: 1992

Passengers
- FY 2025: 37,278 (Amtrak)

Services
Preceding station	Amtrak	Following station
Quantico toward Norfolk or Newport News	Northeast Regional	Alexandria toward Boston South or Springfield
Auto Train does not stop here
Carolinian does not stop here
Floridian does not stop here
Palmetto does not stop here
Silver Meteor does not stop here
Preceding station	Virginia Railway Express	Following station
Rippon toward Spotsylvania	Fredericksburg Line	Lorton toward Union Station
Location

Woodbridge station is a train station in Woodbridge, Virginia. It serves Amtrak's Northeast Regional service and Virginia Railway Express's Fredericksburg Line.

== History ==
The Woodbridge station was originally built in 1992. It is located near the site of a former Richmond, Fredericksburg and Potomac Railroad station, which was called Occoquan until 1951. The Carolinian stopped here between 1995 and 1999.

A second platform on the western side of the tracks was completed prior to the planned Summer 2010 initiation of express service to Washington. Access from northbound US 1 to the platform and elevator on the western side was included in the project.

A planned $29.7 million project will add a third track, convert one side platform to an island platform, and lengthen both platforms. Construction is expected to be complete around 2027.
