= Quantico station =

Train station in Quantico, Virginia, USA

Quantico
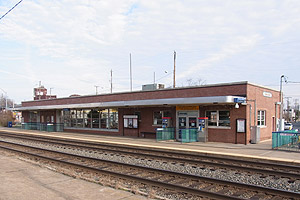
- Quantico station in January 2013

General information
- Location: 550 Railroad Avenue; Quantico, Virginia; United States
- Coordinates: 38°31′18″N 77°17′35″W
- Owner: CSX Transportation
- Operator: Virginia Railway Express
- Line: CSX RF&P Subdivision
- Platforms: 2 side platforms
- Tracks: 2
- Connections: OmniLink: R1

Construction
- Parking: 258 spaces
- Cycle facilities: Racks
- Accessible: Yes

Other information
- Station code: Amtrak: QAN
- Fare zone: 6 (VRE)

History
- Opened: 1872
- Rebuilt: 1919, 1953

Passengers
- FY 2025: 20,492 (Amtrak)

Services
Preceding station	Amtrak	Following station
Fredericksburg toward Charlotte	Carolinian	Alexandria toward New York
Fredericksburg toward Norfolk or Newport News	Northeast Regional	Woodbridge toward Boston South or Springfield
Auto Train does not stop here
Floridian does not stop here
Palmetto does not stop here
Silver Meteor does not stop here
Preceding station	Virginia Railway Express	Following station
Brooke toward Spotsylvania	Fredericksburg Line	Rippon toward Union Station
Former services
Preceding station	Richmond, Fredericksburg and Potomac Railroad	Following station
Wide Water toward Richmond: Broad Street or Main Street	Main Line	Cherry Hill toward Washington, D.C.
Location

Quantico station is a train station in Quantico, Virginia, served by two Amtrak trains and the Virginia Railway Express's Fredericksburg Line. The existing station house was originally built by the Richmond, Fredericksburg and Potomac Railroad in 1953. It is located at 550 Railroad Avenue at Potomac Avenue and is surrounded by the Quantico Marine Base.

== History ==
In 1872, Quantico was the original northern terminus for the Richmond, Fredericksburg and Potomac Railroad. The station also included a freight station on the opposite side of the tracks. Acquisition of the Washington Southern Railway helped expand the line into Washington, D.C. In 1919, a two-story railroad station was built to replace the original station, but as the USMC base began to encroach on the area, RF&P was ordered to rebuild the station in 1953 in order to conform to similar design standards of the base. RF&P ceased passenger operations in 1971 and the station has been used by Amtrak ever since then. The Virginia Railway Express established the Fredericksburg Line in 1992, and Quantico became one of the stations used along the line.

In 2021 construction began on the new platforms as well as a 3rd track. Construction was scheduled to be completed by the end of 2023.
