= Crystal City station (VRE) =

Commuter rail station in Crystal City, Virginia

Crystal City
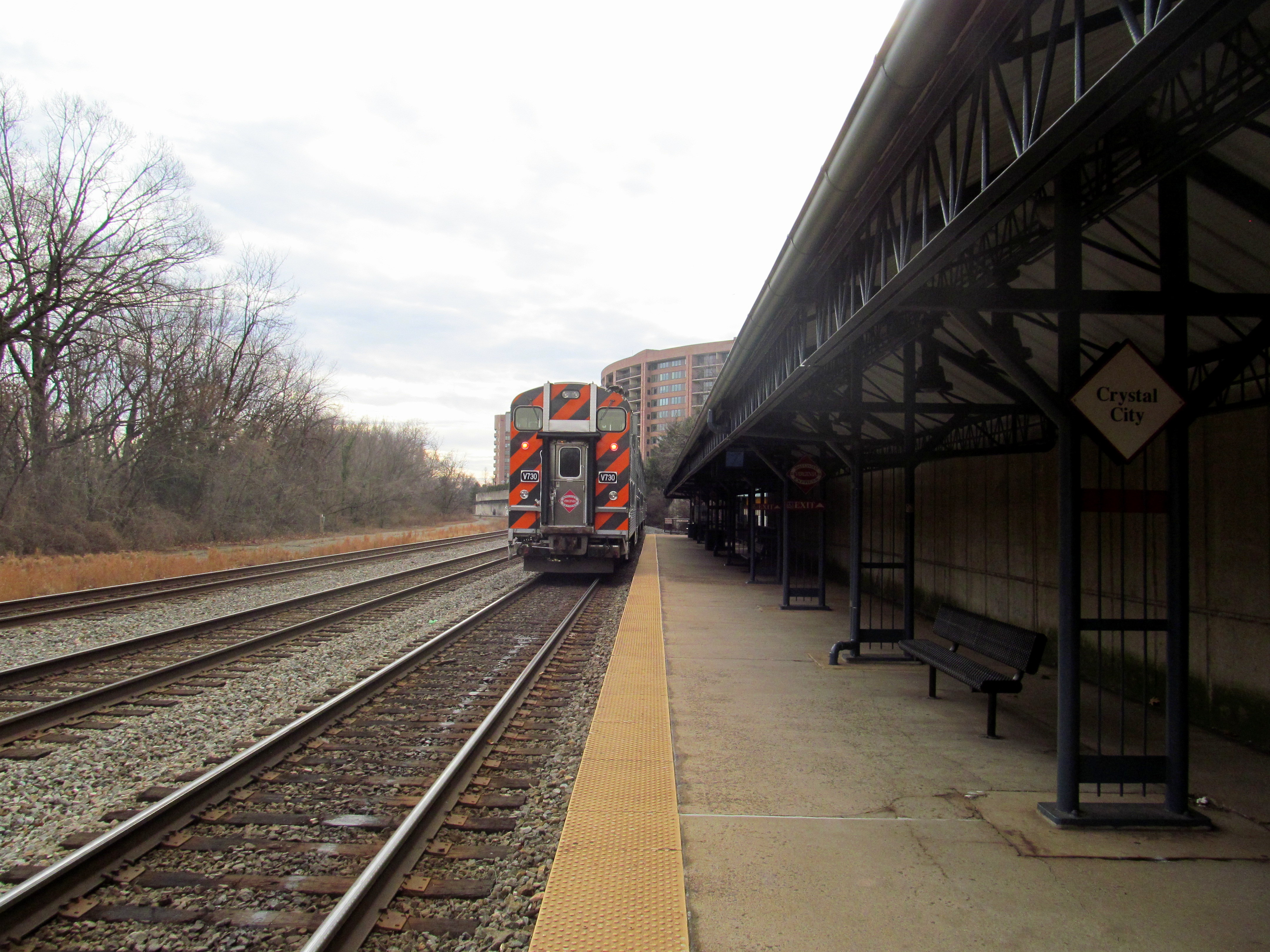
- A southbound Manassas Line train at Crystal City station in 2017

General information
- Location: 1503 South Crystal Drive, Arlington County, Virginia; U.S.
- Coordinates: 38°51′34″N 77°02′54″W
- Line: CSX RF&P Subdivision
- Platforms: 1 side platform
- Tracks: 3
- Connections: Washington Metro: (at Crystal City); Arlington Transit: 43; Fairfax Connector: 598, 599; Metrobus: A11, A1X, A40; PRTC OmniRide

Construction
- Accessible: Yes

Other information
- Station code: CCV
- Fare zone: 2

History
- Opened: June 22, 1992

Services
Preceding station	Virginia Railway Express	Following station
Alexandria toward Spotsylvania	Fredericksburg Line	L'Enfant toward Union Station
Alexandria toward Broad Run	Manassas Line	L'Enfant toward Union Station
Proposed services
Preceding station	Amtrak	Following station
Alexandria toward Norfolk, Newport News or Roanoke	Northeast Regional	Washington, D.C. toward Boston South or Springfield
Preceding station	MARC	Following station
Alexandria Terminus	Penn Line	L'Enfant Plaza toward Perryville
Alexandria Terminus	Brunswick Line	L'Enfant Plaza toward Martinsburg or Frederick
Location

Crystal City station is a commuter rail station in the Crystal City section of Arlington County, Virginia, located near the George Washington Memorial Parkway and Ronald Reagan Washington National Airport. It is served by the Fredericksburg Line and Manassas Line of the Virginia Railway Express (VRE) system. VRE plans to rebuild the station nearby to accommodate longer trains and increased service.

== History ==
=== Planned rebuild ===
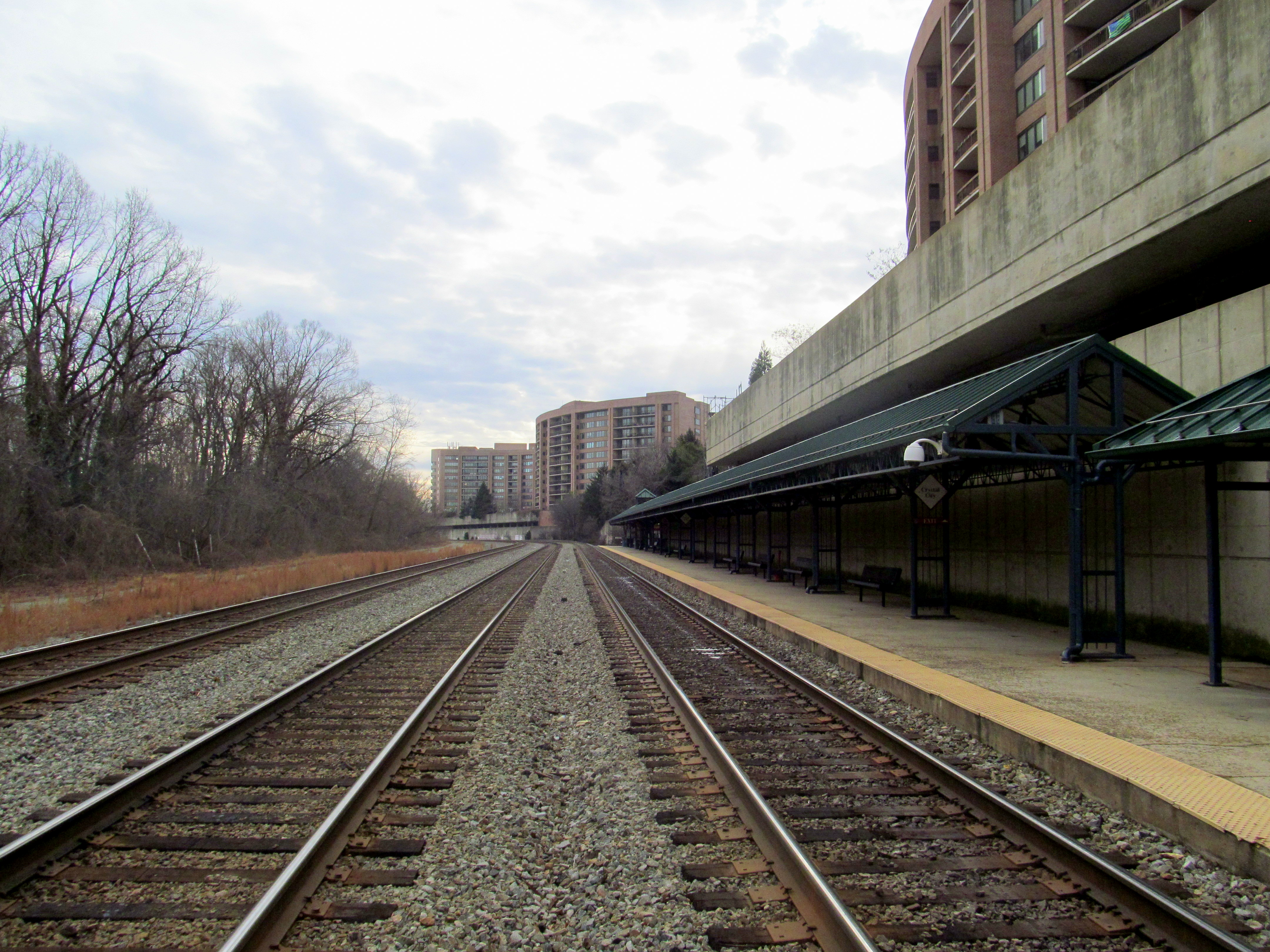
The existing platform only serves one of the three tracks

Crystal City station represents an "operational bottleneck" for VRE: the single 400-foot (120 m)-long platform is shorter than 700-foot (210 m) trains and forces all trains to use one track.

VRE plans to expand the station into a full-length center platform serving two tracks, with grade-separated access to the platform. An alternatives analysis released in November 2017 analyzed three possible sites. All three sites would allow for a future pedestrian bridge or tunnel to Ronald Reagan Washington National Airport to give direct airport access from the station and Crystal City. The preferred location was slightly south of the current station, with the platform stretching from 18th Street to south of 20th Street.

Preliminary engineering for the station began in late 2019. As of January 2021, final design was expected to last from January 2021 to August 2022, with construction from November 2022 to October 2024. In May 2022, Amtrak and the Virginia Passenger Rail Authority reached an agreement to add a separate Amtrak platform at the station. The station will be constructed with a single 850-foot (260 m)-long island platform with a low-level section for VRE and a high-level section for Amtrak.

The project was awarded $18.8 million in state funding in June 2023, completing the $50 million in funds needed for the station. An environmental assessment for the airport connection was released in July 2023. The preferred alternative was a footbridge connecting to the south entrance of the VRE station.

== Station layout ==
The station has a single side platform located on the west side of the three tracks of the RF&P Subdivision.

== Passenger usage ==
Crystal City station was used by 18% of VRE riders in 2017.
