= Fredericksburg Line =

Commuter rail service in Northern Virginia

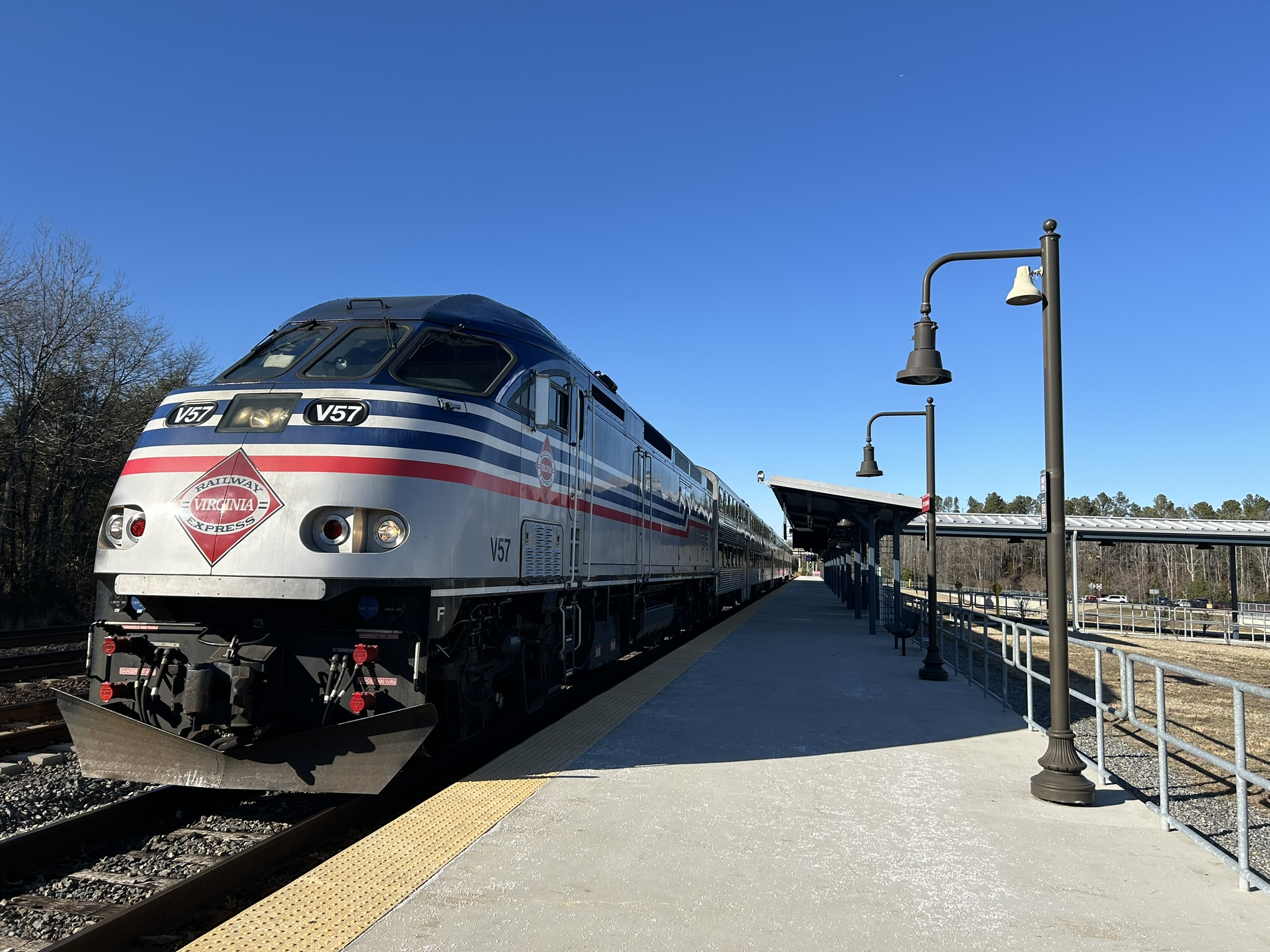
- VRE train at Spotsylvania station in January 2025

Overview
- Owner: CSX Transportation
- Locale: Washington, D.C., Alexandria, Fairfax County, Prince William County, Stafford County, and Fredericksburg, Virginia
- Termini: Union Station (Washington, D.C.); Fredericksburg, VA
- Stations: 13 (1 planned)

Service
- Type: Commuter rail
- System: Virginia Railway Express
- Train number(s): 300–315
- Operator(s): Virginia Railway Express
- Daily ridership: 7,759 (April 2025)

History
- Opened: July 20, 1992

Technical
- Line length: 54 miles
- Character: 2 track main line
- Track gauge: 1,435 mm (4 ft 8 1/2 in)
- Operating speed: 79 mph (127km/h) (top); 33.1mph (52.9km/h) (average)
Route map
Fredericksburg Line highlighted in red

The Fredericksburg Line is a commuter rail service operated by Virginia Railway Express between Washington, D.C., and Olive, Virginia. Virginia Railway Express operates 8 weekday trains, and Amtrak trains serve a few of the stations on the line. Trackage is owned by CSX as part of their RF&P Subdivision.

The line's trains get around 7,759 boardings per weekday in April 2025.

== History ==
=== RF&P ===
What is today the Fredericksburg Line was originally part of the Richmond, Fredericksburg & Potomac Railroad (or RF&P), a connector railroad between the Pennsylvania and Baltimore and Ohio Railroads in Washington, D.C., and the Seaboard Air Line and Atlantic Coast Line Railroads in Richmond. In 1991 CSX absorbed the RF&P and the line is now their RF&P Subdivision.

=== Virginia Railway Express ===
In 1992 Virginia Railway Express (or VRE) was formed to serve the former RF&P between Washington's Union Station and Fredericksburg, Virginia as well as stations between Washington and Manassas, Virginia on Norfolk Southern's Piedmont Division. In 2015, the route was extended to Spotsylvania.

== Amtrak ==
Along with VRE, many Amtrak trains also utilize this line. Their Northeast Regional trains stop at six of the 12 stations on the line and Alexandria is a major stop for six of their long-distance trains.

== Expansion ==
Work was completed on a third track between Alexandria and Franconia-Springfield in 2010. This track enables VRE and Amtrak trains to bypass slow freight trains over Franconia Hill. VRE would also like to add another third track between Powells Creek in Prince William County and Arkendale Road in Stafford County in the near future.

== Stations list ==
State	Town/City	Station	Connections
District of Columbia	Washington	Union Station	Amtrak: Acela, Cardinal, Carolinian, Crescent, Floridian, Northeast Regional, Palmetto, Silver Meteor, Vermonter, Thruway Bus to Charlottesville, Virginia; MARC: ■ Brunswick Line, ■ Camden Line, ■ Penn Line; VRE: ■ Manassas Line; Metrorail: Metrobus, LC Transit, OmniRide, MTA Commuter Bus
District of Columbia	Washington	L'Enfant	VRE: ■ Manassas Line; Metrorail: Metrobus, LC Transit, OmniRide, MTA Commuter Bus
Virginia	Arlington	Crystal City	VRE: ■ Manassas Line; Metrorail: Metroway; Metrobus, ART, Fairfax Connector, LC Transit, OmniRide
Virginia	Alexandria	Alexandria	Amtrak: Cardinal, Carolinian, Crescent, Floridian, Northeast Regional, Palmetto, Silver Meteor; VRE: ■ Manassas Line; Metrorail: Metrobus, DASH Bus
Virginia	Springfield	Franconia–Springfield	Metrorail: Metrobus, Fairfax Connector, OmniRide
Virginia	Lorton	Lorton	Fairfax Connector
Virginia	Woodbridge	Woodbridge	Amtrak: Northeast Regional; OmniRide, OmniLink
Virginia	Woodbridge	Rippon	OmniRide
Virginia	Dumfries	Potomac Shores	
Virginia	Quantico	Quantico	Amtrak: Carolinian, Northeast Regional; OmniRide, Fredericksburg Regional Transit
Virginia	Stafford	Brooke	
Virginia	Falmouth	Leeland Road	
Virginia	Fredericksburg	Fredericksburg	Amtrak: Carolinian, Northeast Regional, Silver Meteor; Fredericksburg Regional Transit
Virginia	Spotsylvania	Spotsylvania	

== See also ==
- RF&P Subdivision
