= Richmond, Fredericksburg and Potomac Railroad =

Railroad company in Virginia, later part of CSX

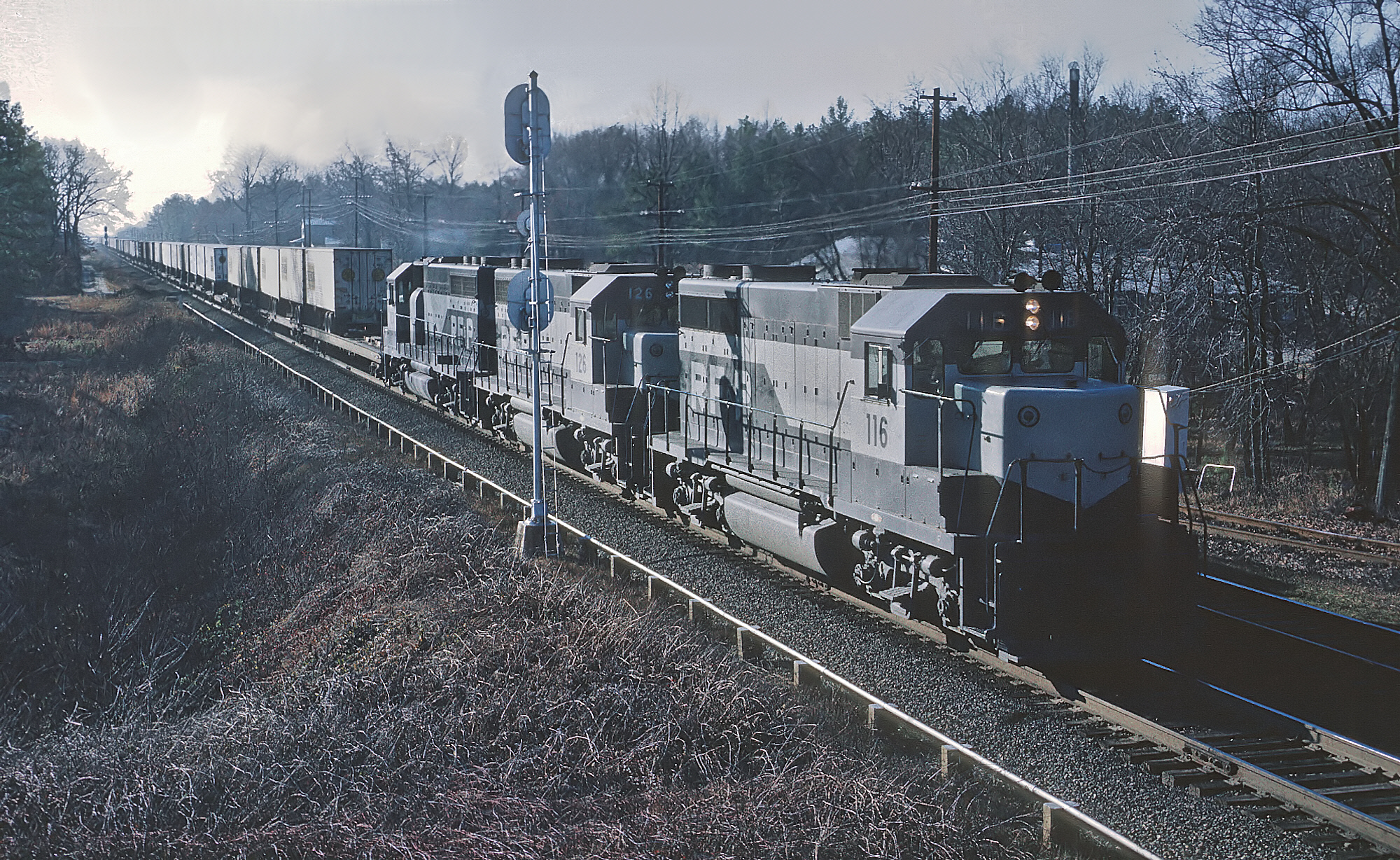
- A Richmond, Fredericksburg and Potomac Railroad freight train passing through Doswell, Virginia, in 1969

Overview
- Headquarters: Richmond, Virginia, U.S.
- Reporting mark: RFP
- Locale: Maryland, Virginia, U.S.
- Dates of operation: 1834–1991
- Successor: CSXT

Technical
- Track gauge: 4 ft 8 1/2 in (1,435 mm) standard gauge

The Richmond, Fredericksburg, and Potomac Railroad (reporting mark RFP) was a railroad in the U.S. state of Virginia, connecting Richmond to Washington, D.C. The track is now the RF&P Subdivision of the CSX Transportation system; the original corporation is no longer a railroad company.

The RF&P was a bridge line, with a slogan of "Linking North & South," on a system that stretched about 113 miles (182 km). Until around 1965, the RF&P originated less than 5% of its freight tonnage, probably less than any other Class I railroad. For much of its existence, the RF&P connected with the Chesapeake and Ohio Railway, the Atlantic Coast Line Railroad, and the Seaboard Air Line Railroad at Richmond. At Alexandria and through trackage rights to Washington Union Station in Washington, D.C., it connected with the Pennsylvania Railroad, the Baltimore and Ohio Railroad, and the Southern Railway.

The rail line connected to the Washington and Old Dominion Railroad at Potomac Yard and interchanged with the Chesapeake and Ohio Railway at Doswell. Until 2024, it (along with the former Conrail properties) was the only CSX line to have cab signal requirements on its entire system; the railroad ended this practice on the line in June of that year in favor of positive train control.

== History ==
Revenue passenger traffic, in millions of passenger-miles
Year	Traffic
1925	132
1933	48
1944	822
1960	168
1970	80

The Richmond, Fredericksburg and Potomac Railroad was chartered on February 25, 1834, to run from Richmond north via Fredericksburg to the Potomac River. It opened from Richmond to Hazel Run in 1836, to Fredericksburg on January 23, 1837, and the rest of the way to the Potomac River at Aquia Creek on September 30, 1842. Steamboat service to Washington, D.C., and the Baltimore and Ohio Railroad was provided by the Washington and Fredericksburg Steamboat Company, later renamed the Potomac Steamboat Company, controlled by the railroad after 1845.

Badly damaged during the Civil War, on October 11, 1870, an extension to the north toward Quantico was authorized at a special meeting of the company's stockholders. The company's charter limited this branch to 10 miles, leaving it 1.7 miles short of the Alexandria and Fredericksburg Railroad. This split from the existing line at Brooke and ran north to Quantico, also on the Potomac. The old line to the Aquia Creek wharf was abandoned on the opening of the Quantico wharf on May 1, 1872.

On the other end of the line, the Alexandria and Washington Railroad was chartered on February 27, 1854, to build from the south end of the Long Bridge over the Potomac River south to Alexandria. That line opened in 1857. The railroad went bankrupt and was sold July 9, 1887, being reorganized November 23, 1887, as the Alexandria and Washington Railway. In 1873 the Baltimore and Potomac Railroad's branch over the Long Bridge opened, giving a route into Washington, D.C., over which the A&W obtained trackage rights.

Revenue freight traffic, in millions of net ton-miles
Year	Traffic
1925	438
1933	265
1944	1462
1960	819
1970	1102

The Alexandria and Fredericksburg Railway was chartered February 3, 1864, to continue the line from Alexandria to Fredericksburg. It opened on July 2, 1872, only reaching Quantico, the north end of the RF&P. At Quantico the 1.7-mile (2.7 km) Potomac Railroad, chartered April 21, 1867, and opened May 1, 1872, connected the two lines. It was leased to the RF&P for 28 years from May 17, 1877. On March 31, 1890, the two companies terminating in Alexandria merged to form the Washington Southern Railway. Until November 1, 1901, it was operated by the Baltimore and Potomac Railroad and its successor the Philadelphia, Baltimore and Washington Railroad (part of the Pennsylvania Railroad system). The Potomac Railroad lease was transferred to the Washington Southern on June 30, 1904. On February 24, 1920, the Washington Southern was formally merged into the RF&P.

The Richmond-Washington Company was incorporated September 5, 1901, as a holding company, owning the entire capital stock of the two railroads. The stock of the company was owned equally by the Pennsylvania Railroad, Baltimore and Ohio Railroad, Atlantic Coast Line Railroad, Southern Railway, Seaboard Air Line Railway and Chesapeake and Ohio Railway. Four of these companies (B&O, ACL, SAL, C&O) have since become part of CSX. The Southern Railway is now part of Norfolk Southern and does not use the former RF&P; the former Pennsylvania Railroad, in its later incarnation as Conrail, has been split between CSX and Norfolk Southern with most of PRR's routes becoming part of Norfolk Southern. However, the portion of the former PRR that connected to the very north of the RF&P's former Potomac Yard, across the Long Bridge and into Washington DC, became part of CSX following the takeover of Conrail by NS and CSX.

On December 31, 1925, RF&P operated 118 miles of road and 432 miles of track; on December 31, 1970, mileages were 118 and 518.

Company Presidents
President	Years
John A. Lancaster	1834–1836
Conway Robinson	1836–1838
Joseph M. Sheppard	1836–1840
Moncure Robinson	1840–1847
Edwin Robinson	1847–1860
Peter V. Daniel Jr.	1860–1871
John M. Robinson	1871–1878
Robert Ould	1878–1881
Joseph P. Brinton	1881–1889
E. D. T. Myers	1889–1905
William J. Leake	1905–1907
William White	1907-1920
Eppa Hunton Jr.	1920–1932
Norman Call	1932–1955
William T. Rice	1955-1957
Wirt P. Marks Jr.	1957–1960
Stuart Shumate	1961-1981
John J. Newbauer Jr.	1981–1985
Richard L. Beadles	1985–1986
Frank A. Crovo Jr.	1986–1991

== Passenger service ==
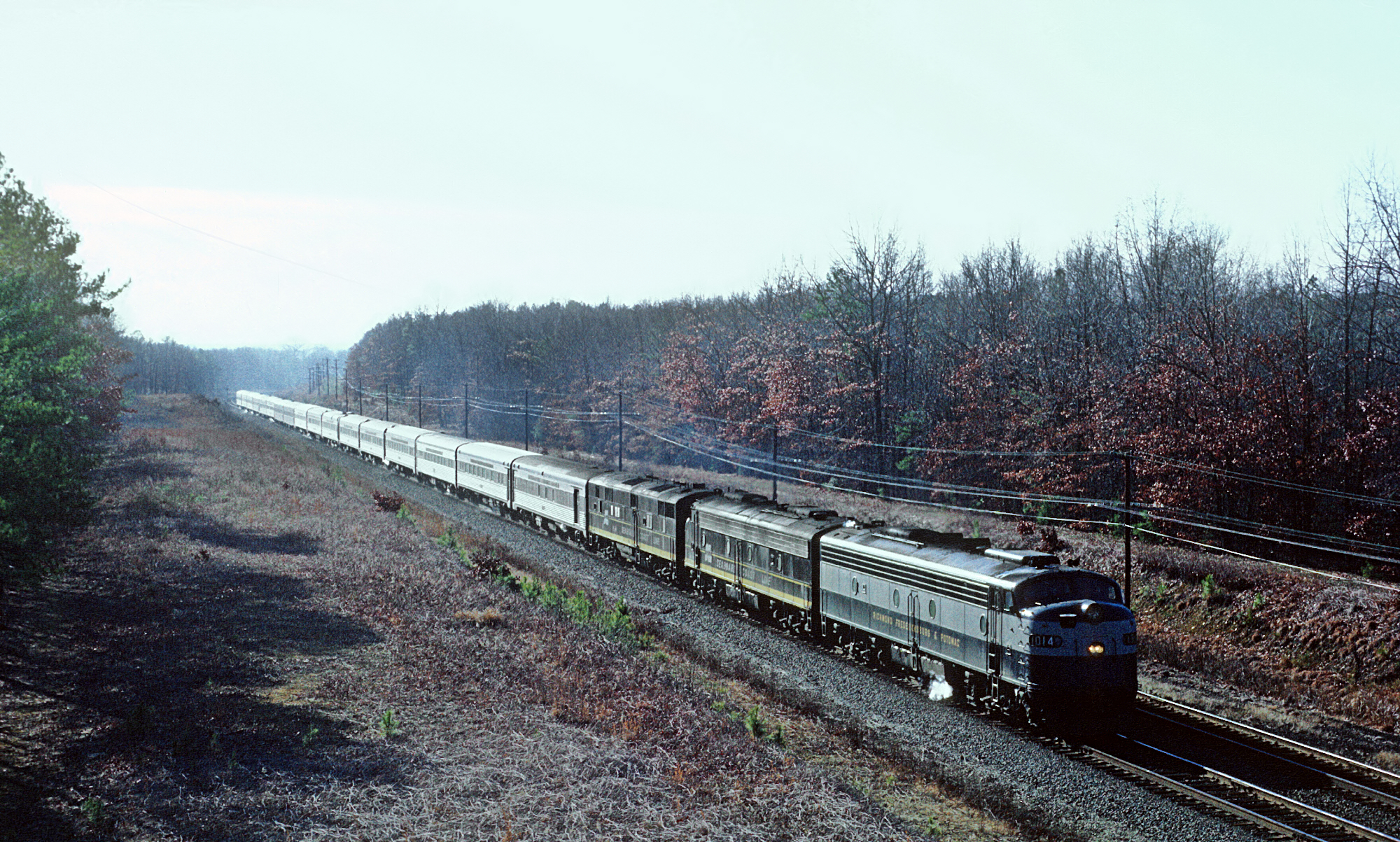
The Florida Special hauled by RF&P locomotives north of Ashland, VA on January 12, 1969

As the link between "North and South" the RF&P primarily hosted the trains of other railroads, particularly those on the lucrative New York–Florida run. In March 1950 this included the East Coast Champion, West Coast Champion, Miamian, Palmland, Silver Star, Silver Comet, Orange Blossom Special, Silver Meteor, Vacationer, Havana Special, Palmetto, Florida Special, Cotton Blossom, Sunland, and Everglades.

The RF&P operated comparatively few trains of its own. One was the Old Dominion, a streamliner inaugurated in 1947 between Washington and Richmond. This train used four 70-seat coaches and a cafe-parlor car, all built by American Car and Foundry. In 1956, the RF&P operated two daily passenger trains, one of which was a local and the other an express in addition to operating numerous through trains from other railroads.

== Branches ==
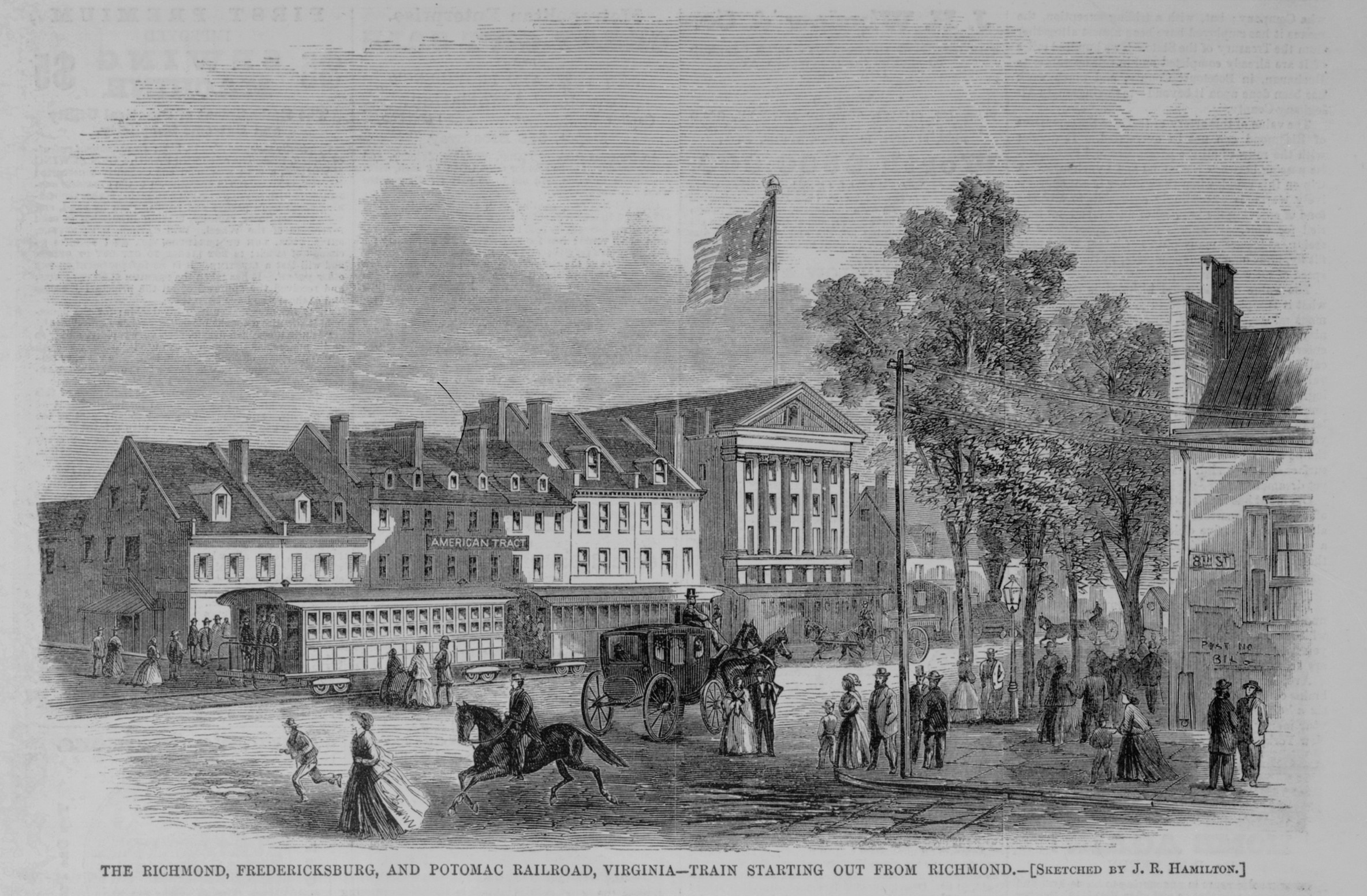
RF&P train starting out from Richmond, Virginia, in 1865.

The Richmond, Fredericksburg and Potomac and Richmond and Petersburg Railroad Connection was chartered March 3, 1866, and opened May 1, 1867, as a connection between the RF&P and the Richmond and Petersburg Railroad (later part of the Atlantic Coast Line Railroad) west of downtown Richmond. It was operated jointly by those two companies. In addition, a downtown connection was owned by the R&P past Broad Street Station.

The Louisa Railroad was chartered in 1836, running from the RF&P at Doswell west to Louisa. At first it was operated as a branch of the RF&P, but it was reorganized as the Virginia Central Railroad in 1850 and merged into the Chesapeake and Ohio Railroad in 1868 as its oldest predecessor.

In 1896, the Washington Southern Railway opened a 1.13 miles (1.82 km) branch that connected the south end of the Long Bridge in Jackson City to the south end of the Aqueduct Bridge in Rosslyn. The Railway built much of the branch within the grade of the old disused Alexandria Canal.

In 1904, the Rosslyn Connecting Railroad, which the Philadelphia, Baltimore and Washington Railroad controlled, acquired the branch on the same day (February 29) that the railroad was incorporated in accordance with Virginia law. The Rosslyn Connecting Railroad abandoned nearly all of its line in 1962 and closed in 1969 after operating for 65 years.

In 1977, the Washington Metropolitan Area Transit Authority opened a surface-level section of Metrorail's Blue Line that replaced most of the section of the Rosslyn Connecting Railroad's line that had traveled within the Alexandria Canal's grade. The section of the Blue Line parallels Virginia State Route 110 where passing Arlington National Cemetery.

== Heritage units ==
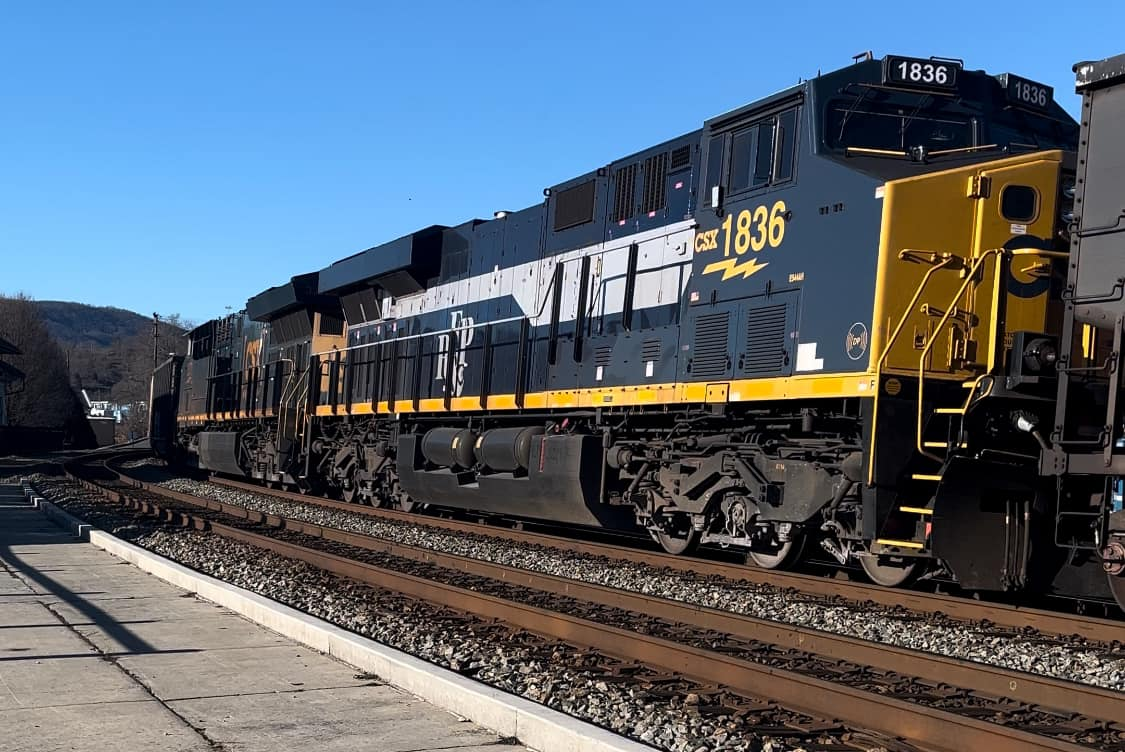
CSX 1836 in Covington, Virginia.

On February 12, 2024, CSX unveiled ES44AH No. 1836 as the 10th unit in their fleet. The unit is designed with the cab staying in YN3C and the long hood being painted in the RF&P blue and grey. Another unit, GP40-2 No. 6394 (former RF&P 142) had its nose vandalized into its original RF&P look.

== Station listing ==
Milepost	City	Station	Opening date	Connections and notes
CFP110.1	Alexandria	RO Interlocking		north end of the RF&P at Potomac Yard, continues via trackage rights over Baltimore and Potomac Railroad (PRR) to Washington Union Station in Washington, D.C. junction with Rosslyn Connecting Railroad (PRR)
CFP109.0	Alexandria	Crystal City		Virginia Railway Express Fredericksburg Line and Manassas Line
CFP106.5	Alexandria	Slater's Lane		junction with Norfolk Southern (SOU) branch to Mirant power plant and Robinson Terminal warehouse on the Alexandria waterfront. Defective equipment detector.
CFP105.3	Alexandria	Alexandria	1905	Virginia Railway Express Fredericksburg Line and Manassas Line; Amtrak Carolinian, Northeast Regional, Palmetto, Silver Meteor, Crescent and Silver Star
CFP104.3	Alexandria	AF Interlocking		junction with Orange and Alexandria Railroad (SOU)
CFP99.3	Springfield	Franconia	1870	Closed 1952. Replaced by Franconia–Springfield (WMATA station) with additional Virginia Railway Express Fredericksburg Line and Amtrak NortheastRegional service in 1997.
CFP95.7	Newington	Newington		Station also known at times as "Accotink"; was interchange point with the U.S. Government Branch to Fort Belvoir.
CFP92.5	Lorton	Lorton		Virginia Railway Express Fredericksburg Line; Amtrak Auto Train junction with Lorton and Occoquan Railroad
CFP89.9	Colchester	Colchester		
CFP89.4	Woodbridge	Woodbridge		Virginia Railway Express Fredericksburg Line; Amtrak Northeast Regional; station also known at times as "Occoquan".
CFP85.7	Woodbridge	Rippon		Virginia Railway Express Fredericksburg Line
CFP82.4	Cherry Hill	Cherry Hill		
CFP78.8	Quantico	Quantico	1872	Rebuilt in 1919 and 1953. Virginia Railway Express Fredericksburg Line; Amtrak Carolinian and Northeast Regional
CFP74.1	Widewater	Widewater		
CFP70.7	Aquia	Aquia		
CFP68.1	Stafford	Brooke		Virginia Railway Express Fredericksburg Line
CFP63.4	Falmouth	Leeland		Virginia Railway Express Fredericksburg Line
CFP59.4	Fredericksburg	Fredericksburg	1910	Virginia Railway Express Fredericksburg Line; Amtrak Carolinian and Northeast Regional junction with Virginia Central Railway
CFP51.5		Summit		
CFP46.9	Guinea	Guinea		Freight ramp still exists diagonally across the tracks from the entrance to the Stonewall Jackson Shrine
CFP44.5	Woodford	Woodford		Still exists next to the Woodford Post Office
		Bowling Green Park		
CFP37.8	Milford	Milford	1891	Still exists across from the corner of Antioch Road and Colonial Road
CFP33	Penola	Penola	1886	
CFP27.1	Ruther Glen	Ruther Glen		
CFP21.8	Doswell	Doswell		Rebuilt in 1928. Junction with Virginia Central Railroad (C&O).
CFP14.8	Ashland	Ashland	1866	Rebuilt 1890 and 1923. Currently serves Amtrak's Northeast Regional line
CFP11.5	Elmont	Elmont		
CFP8.1	Glen Allen	Glen Allen		Closed in 1956.
CFP6.4	Laurel	Laurel		
CFP4.6	Richmond	Staples Mill Road	1975	Amtrak Carolinian, Palmetto, Northeast Regional, Silver Meteor, and Silver Star
CFP1.7	Richmond	AY Interlocking		junction with Richmond and Petersburg Railroad; Connection at Acca Yard
CFP0.0	Richmond	Broad Street Station	1917	Closed in 1975, and now is the home of the Science Museum of Virginia.
