= Rippon station =

Train station in Woodbridge, Virginia

Rippon
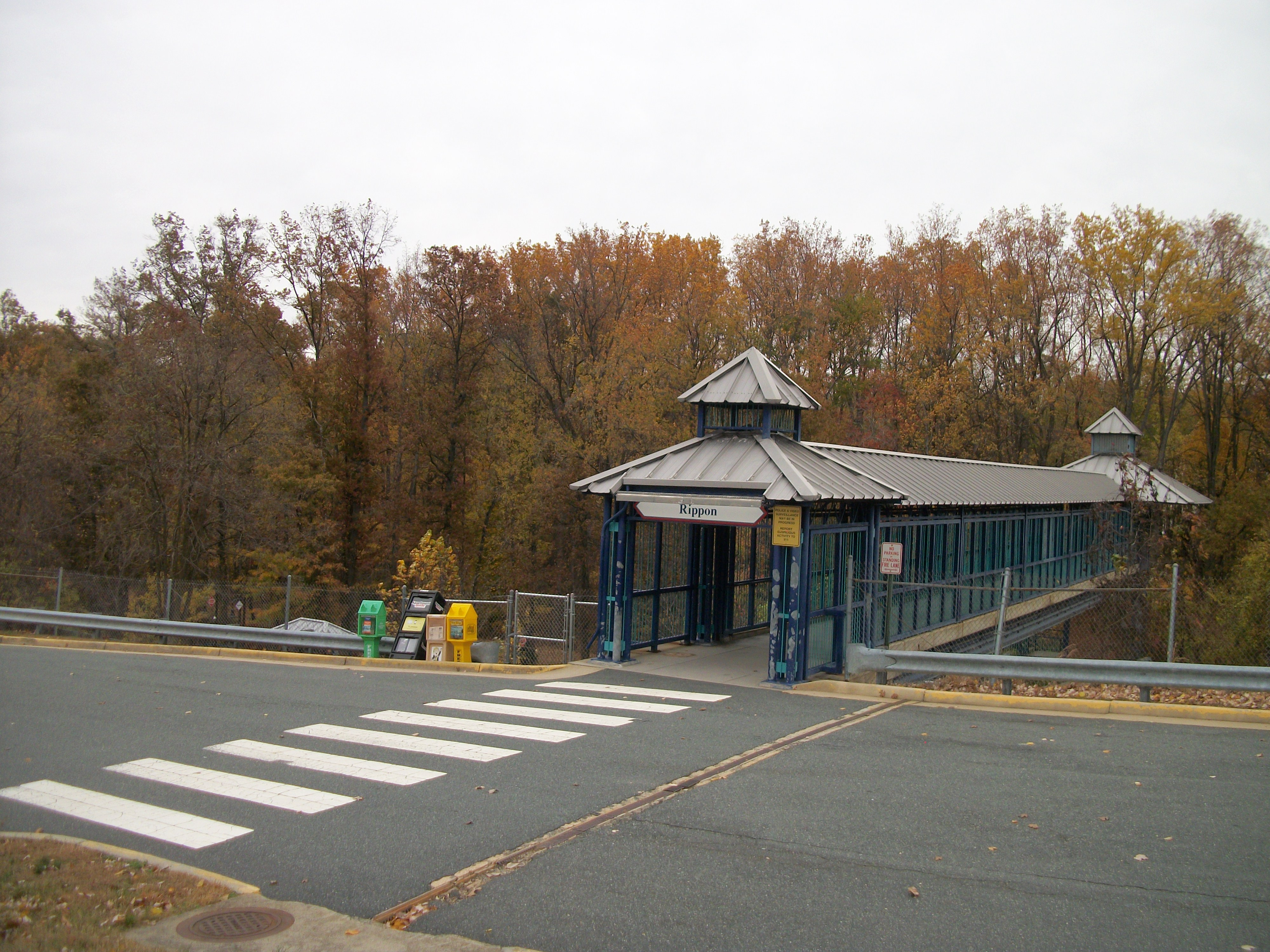
- Station footbridge over the tracks from the parking lot

General information
- Location: 15511 Farm Creek Drive; Woodbridge, Virginia; United States
- Coordinates: 38.6124°N 77.2534°W
- Owner: Virginia Railway Express
- Line: RF&P Subdivision (CSXT)
- Platforms: 1 side platform
- Tracks: 2

Construction
- Parking: 676 free spaces
- Accessible: Yes

Other information
- Station code: RIP
- Fare zone: 5

History
- Opened: 1992

Services
Preceding station	Virginia Railway Express	Following station
Quantico toward Spotsylvania	Fredericksburg Line	Woodbridge toward Union Station
Potomac Shores (Planned) toward Spotsylvania	Fredericksburg Line	Woodbridge toward Union Station
Location

Rippon station is a Virginia Railway Express station located at 15511 Farm Creek Drive in Woodbridge, Virginia. The station, one of two VRE stations in Woodbridge, is located at a southerly dead end, and is named for the closest and last intersection with Farm Creek Drive. It serves the Fredericksburg Line and shares the right-of-way with Amtrak's Auto Train, Carolinian, Floridian, Northeast Regional, Palmetto, and Silver Meteor trains; however, no Amtrak trains stop here. Rippon station is located along the west side of the Featherstone National Wildlife Refuge.

Rippon has one low-level side platform serving Virginia Railway Express on both tracks.
