= Alexandria Union Station =

Historic train station in Virginia, US

Alexandria
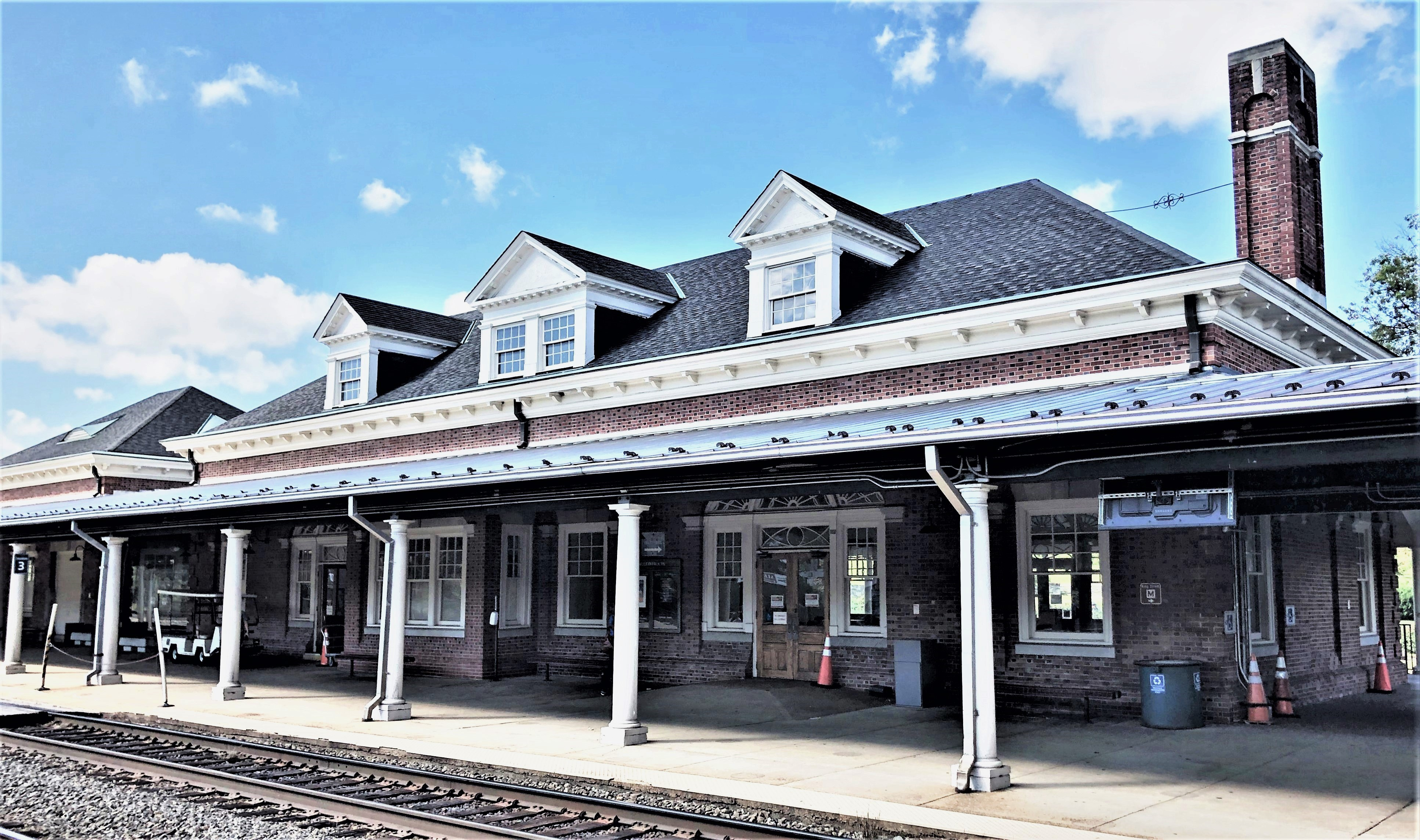
- Alexandria Union Station, 2021

General information
- Location: 110 Callahan Drive; Alexandria, Virginia; United States
- Coordinates: 38°48′23″N 77°03′44″W
- Owner: City of Alexandria
- Operator: Amtrak
- Line: CSX RF&P Subdivision
- Platforms: 1 side platform, 1 island platform
- Tracks: 3
- Connections: at King Street–Old Town; DASH: 30, 31, 32, 33, 102, 102X, King Street Trolley; Metrobus: A71, F1X, F20, F23, F24, P90

Construction
- Parking: Yes
- Accessible: Yes

Other information
- Station code: Amtrak: ALX
- Fare zone: 2 (VREX)

History
- Opened: 1905
- Rebuilt: 1982

Passengers
- FY 2025: 372,327 (Amtrak)

Services
Preceding station	Amtrak	Following station
Manassas toward Chicago	Cardinal	Washington, D.C. toward New York
Quantico toward Charlotte	Carolinian	Washington, D.C. toward New York
Manassas toward New Orleans	Crescent	Washington, D.C. toward New York
Richmond Staples Mill Road toward Savannah	Palmetto	Washington, D.C. toward New York
Fredericksburg toward Miami	Silver Meteor	Washington, D.C. toward New York
Richmond Staples Mill Road toward Miami	Floridian	Washington, D.C. toward Chicago
Burke Centre toward Roanoke	Northeast Regional	Washington, D.C. toward Boston South or Springfield
Woodbridge toward Norfolk or Newport News	Northeast Regional	Washington, D.C. toward Boston South or Springfield
Preceding station	Virginia Railway Express	Following station
Franconia–Springfield toward Spotsylvania	Fredericksburg Line	Crystal City toward Union Station
Backlick Road toward Broad Run	Manassas Line	Crystal City toward Union Station
Former services
Preceding station	Amtrak	Following station
Richmond Staples Mill Road toward Miami	Silver Star	Washington, D.C. toward New York
Preceding station	Chesapeake and Ohio Railway	Following station
Manassas toward Cincinnati	Main Line	Washington, D.C. Terminus
Preceding station	Southern Railway	Following station
Seminary toward Birmingham	Main Line	Washington, D.C. Terminus
Preceding station	Richmond, Fredericksburg and Potomac Railroad	Following station
Franconia toward Richmond: Broad Street or Main Street	Main Line	Washington 7th Street toward Washington, D.C.
Proposed services
Preceding station	MARC	Following station
Terminus	Brunswick Line	Crystal City toward Martinsburg or Frederick
Terminus	Penn Line	Crystal City toward Perryville

U.S. National Register of Historic Places
- Designated: February 27, 2013
- Reference no.: 13000044

Virginia Landmarks Register
- Designated: December 13, 2012
- Reference no.: 100-0124
Location

Alexandria Union Station is a historic railroad station in Alexandria, Virginia, south of Washington, D.C. To avoid confusion with nearby Washington Union Station, the station is often referred to as simply Alexandria. Its Amtrak code is ALX. Located in Alexandria's Old Town, the station is served by both Amtrak intercity and Virginia Railway Express (VRE) commuter rail lines. The original passenger terminal, a one-story brick building completed in 1905, remains in use and is on the National Register of Historic Places.

== Site and description ==
The station is located on Callahan Drive in the Old Town section of the city. It is served by both Amtrak intercity and Virginia Railway Express (VRE) commuter rail lines. The station serves as an alternative stop for Amtrak riders traveling through the Washington area, analogous to the role Newark Penn Station plays in the New York area.

It is located directly across the tracks from the King Street–Old Town station of the Washington Metro. Since the opening of the Metro station in 1983, the city has touted the station as an intermodal hub for regional mass transit, linking Amtrak, VRE, and Metro with a number of Alexandria DASH and Metrobus lines. The Virginia Department of Transportation and Northern Virginia Transportation Authority have plans to build a pedestrian tunnel between Union Station and King Street-Old Town; presently, those transferring from Amtrak to Metro must walk about 600 feet (180 m) along King Street. There are also plans to extend MARC service on the Penn and Brunswick Lines to the station.

The original passenger terminal, a one-story brick building completed in 1905, is still in use. Unlike most stations from the era, it was built in the Federal Revival style. The station was extensively renovated in 1982, with further improvements in the mid-1990s. The stone and concrete Veterans of Foreign Wars memorial was constructed at the station in 1940. Alexandria Union Station has been listed on the National Register of Historic Places since February 27, 2013.

== History ==
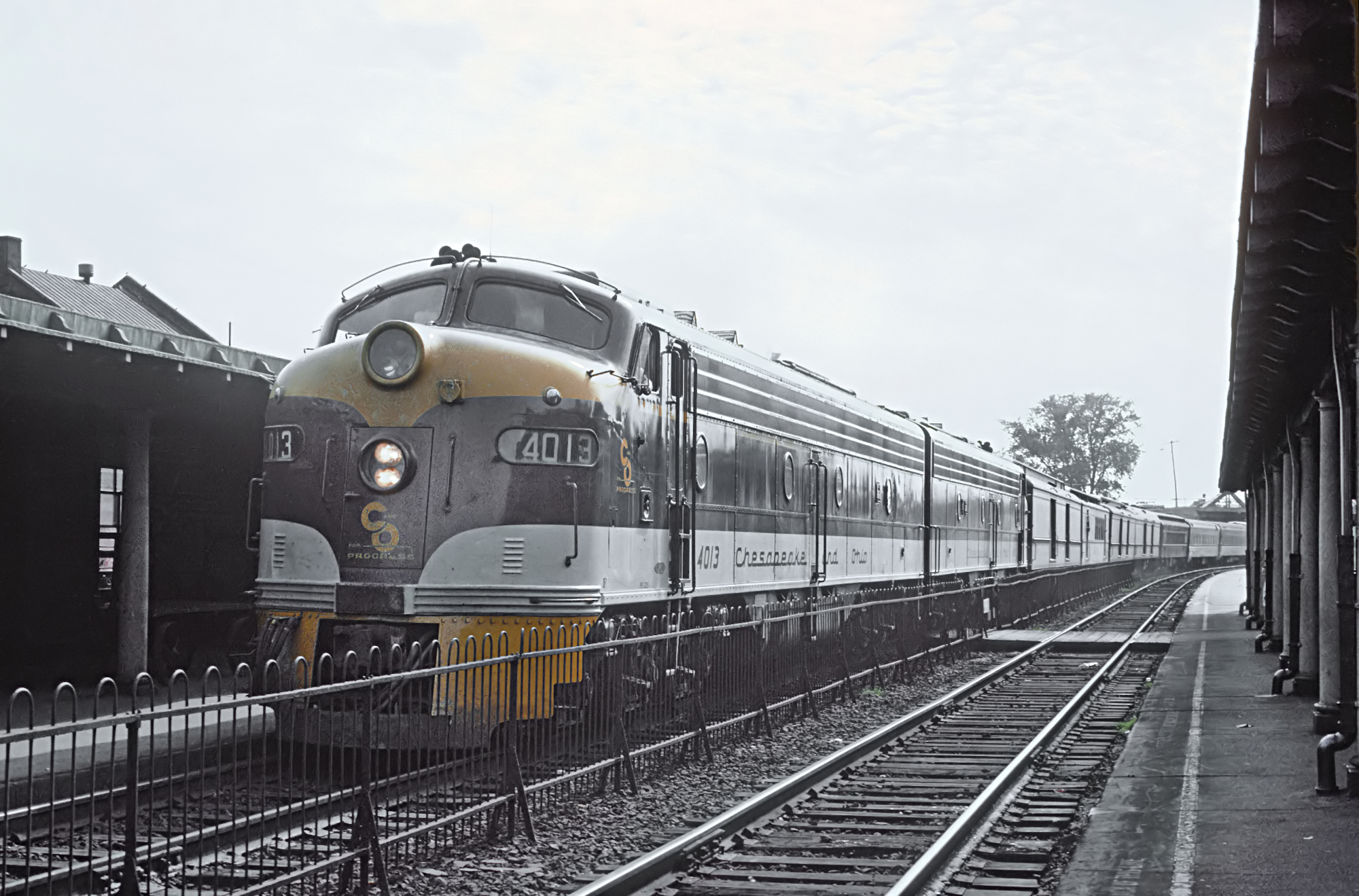
The Chesapeake and Ohio's Sportsman at the station in August 1964

In the late 1840s, the city of Alexandria invested in at least five major railroad projects to link the city with other commercial centers in what proved to be the forlorn hope of competing with Baltimore as a regional industrial and trade center. The numerous competing lines resulted in a mishmash of rails and yards running through the city amidst various railroad mergers and failures.

In 1901, the railroads serving the region, led by the Pennsylvania Railroad, Chesapeake and Ohio Railway, and Baltimore and Ohio Railroad, formed the Richmond-Washington Company to manage traffic between Richmond and Washington and build a consolidated railyard, Potomac Yard. The company's plans included construction of a new passenger terminal west of the city, in what was then part of Arlington County—Alexandria did not annex the land until 1915.

Alexandria Union Station was opened on September 15, 1905, and served passenger trains of the C&O, Washington Southern Railway, Southern Railway and Richmond, Fredericksburg & Potomac Railroad until 1971, when ownership of the station building was assumed by Amtrak, while C&O (now CSX Transportation) bought the tracks. The City of Alexandria took ownership of the station in 2001.

Since the 1970s, Union Station has been the focus of Amtrak's regional services into Virginia. In 1976, Amtrak began running the Colonial from Washington through Alexandria to Newport News. It continues today as a Northeast Regional run.

On October 1, 2009, Amtrak began running two Northeast Regionals to and from Lynchburg, making stops in the state that include Union Station. This was followed by an additional extension to Richmond in 2009, Norfolk in 2012 and Roanoke in 2017.

Restoration of a fourth track at the station and replacement bridges over King Street and Commonwealth Avenue began in November 2025.
