= Penola, Virginia =

Unincorporated community in Virginia, United States

Coordinates: 37°57′26″N 77°22′15″W

Penola is an unincorporated community in Caroline County, in the U.S. state of Virginia.

== History ==
A post office called Penola was established in 1857, and remained in operation until it was discontinued in 1961. Penola is a name derived from a Native American language meaning "cotton". It was a stop on the Richmond, Fredericksburg and Potomac Railroad in the nineteenth Century which was replaced by, CSXT.
