= Fredericksburg station =

Railway station in Fredericksburg, Virginia, US

Fredericksburg
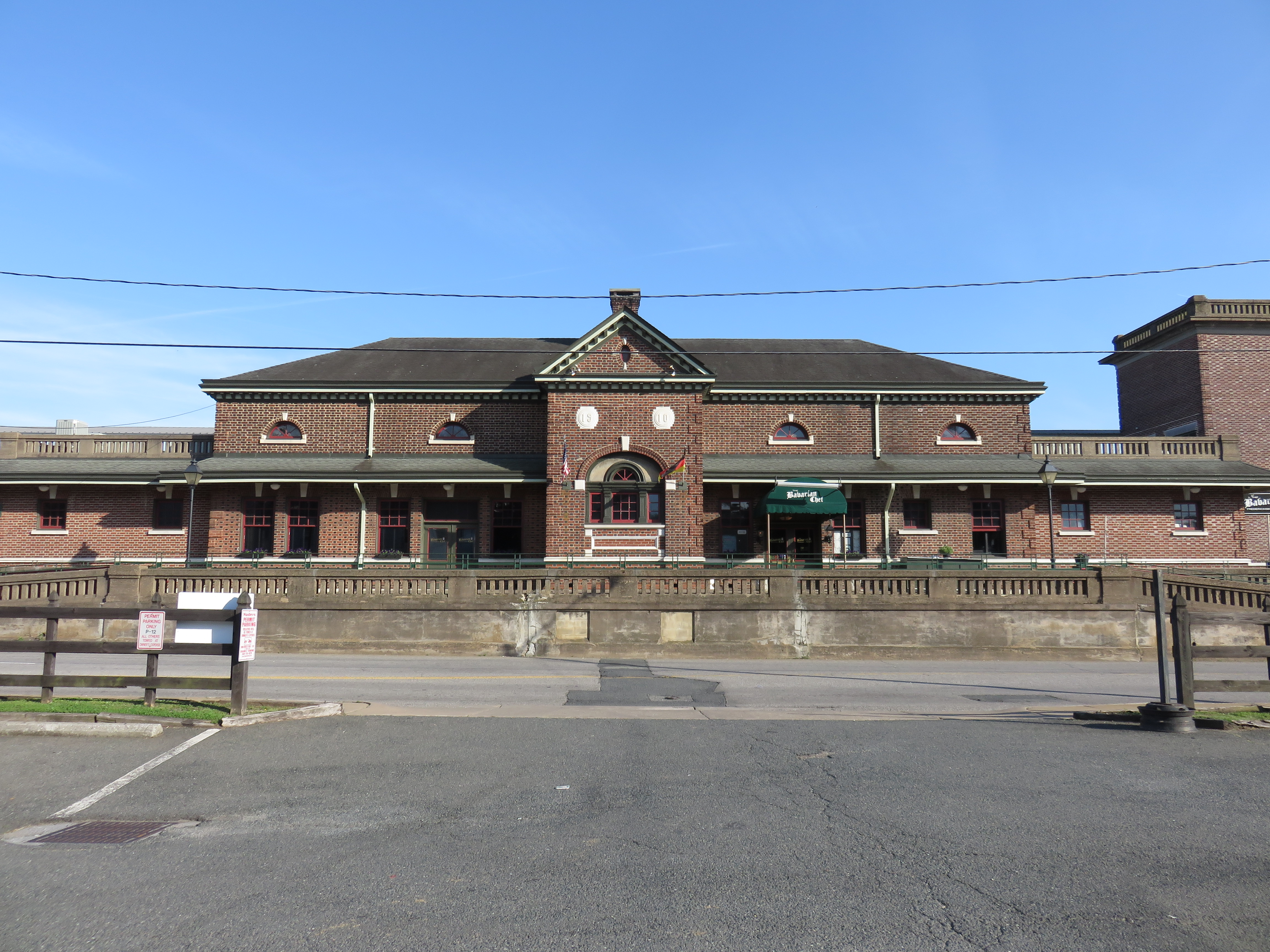
- Fredericksburg station in 2017

General information
- Location: 200 Lafayette Boulevard (US 1 Business); Fredericksburg, Virginia; United States
- Coordinates: 38°17′54″N 77°27′25″W
- Owner: CSX Transportation
- Operator: Virginia Railway Express
- Line: CSX RF&P Subdivision
- Platforms: 2 side platforms
- Tracks: 2
- Connections: FRED: D1, F2, F4, VF1, VS1

Construction
- Parking: Yes
- Cycle facilities: Racks
- Accessible: Yes

Other information
- Station code: Amtrak: FBG
- Fare zone: 9 (VRE)

History
- Opened: January 23, 1837
- Rebuilt: 1850, 1886, 1910, 1927; 2010–2011, 2017–2024

Passengers
- FY 2025: 114,797 (Amtrak)

Services
Preceding station	Amtrak	Following station
Richmond Staples Mill Road toward Charlotte	Carolinian	Quantico toward New York
Ashland toward Norfolk or Newport News	Northeast Regional	Quantico toward Boston South or Springfield
Richmond Staples Mill Road toward Miami	Silver Meteor	Alexandria toward New York
Auto Train does not stop here
Floridian does not stop here
Palmetto does not stop here
Preceding station	Virginia Railway Express	Following station
Spotsylvania Terminus	Fredericksburg Line	Leeland Road toward Union Station
Former services
Preceding station	Richmond, Fredericksburg and Potomac Railroad	Following station
Summit toward Richmond: Broad Street or Main Street	Main Line	Brooke toward Washington, D.C.
Location

Fredericksburg station is a passenger rail station in Fredericksburg, Virginia. It is served by Amtrak's Carolinian, Northeast Regional, and Silver Meteor trains, and the Virginia Railway Express's Fredericksburg Line. The station has two side platforms serving the two elevated tracks of the RF&P Subdivision. It is located on Lafayette Boulevard (U.S. Route 1 Business) at the south end of the downtown area.

== History ==
=== Early stations ===
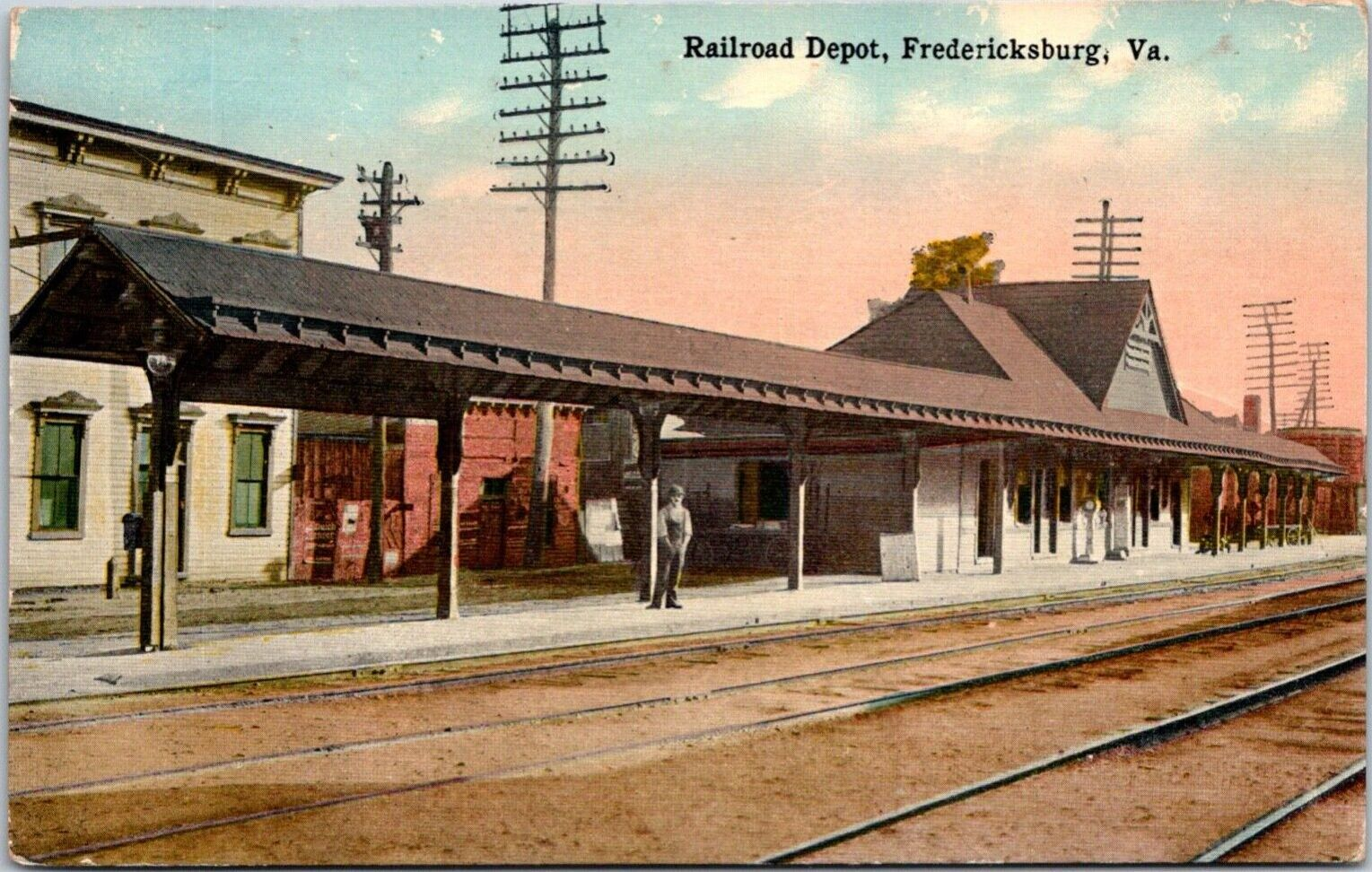
Postcard of the 1886-built station

The Richmond, Fredericksburg and Potomac Railroad (RF&P) opened through Fredericksburg on January 23, 1837. The town had only a platform with no shelter until a small wooden depot was built in 1850. It was located on the south side of the tracks between what are now Charles Street and Princess Anne Street. The adjacent bridge over the Rappahannock River was destroyed early in the Civil War, and regular service did not fully resume until the 1870s.

In 1873, the Fredericksburg and Gordonsville Railroad opened southwest from Fredericksburg. Its successor, the narrow-gauge Potomac, Fredericksburg and Piedmont Railroad (PF&P), was completed to Orange in 1877. The PF&P station, which is still extant, was located north of the RF&P tracks west of Charles Street. The RF&P constructed a new wooden station in 1886 on the same site as the 1850-built station.

=== 1910 station ===
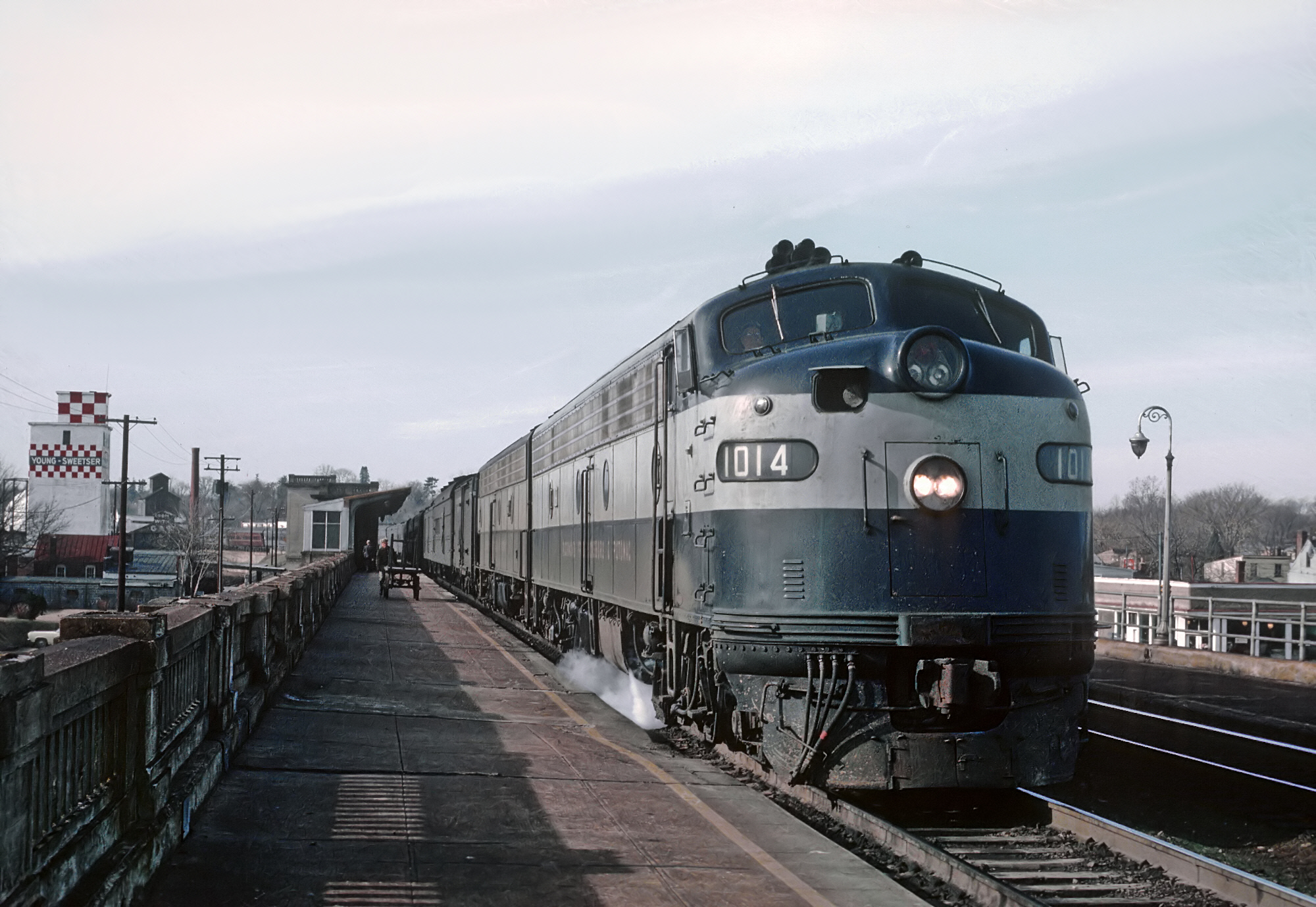
The Silver Star at Fredericksburg in 1969

In 1909, city politicians began agitating for a new RF&P station. Construction began in February 1910 and the new station opened on November 10, 1910. It was located one block east of the former stations on the north side of the tracks, closer to the downtown area. Built in the Colonial Revival style, it cost $125,000.

In 1927, the RF&P mainline was elevated through Fredericksburg to eliminate grade crossings. A temporary station and tracks were built on the south side of the alignment during construction. The station was modified with two new wings. Lafayette Boulevard was lowered, with a ramp built from the new street level to the station entrance. Two side platforms were built for the elevated tracks, with a baggage elevator to track level and a shelter for the northbound platform.

The PF&P was converted to standard gauge in 1926 and became the Virginia Central Railway. It was abandoned in 1937 except for a short section at the Fredericksburg end, which lasted until 1984. Passenger service on the RF&P primarily consisted of long-distance trains serving the southern states, which the railroad carried between Washington and Richmond. By 1955, the line carried 14 daily long-distance round trips plus one Washington–Richmond local round trip, all of which stopped at Fredericksburg.

On January 6, 1956, the railroad eliminated racial segregation at Fredericksburg station in response to an order from the Interstate Commerce Commission (ICC) on an official basis. The railroad had been removing signage denoting the race-based locations for a month prior in expectation of the announcement.

=== Amtrak era ===
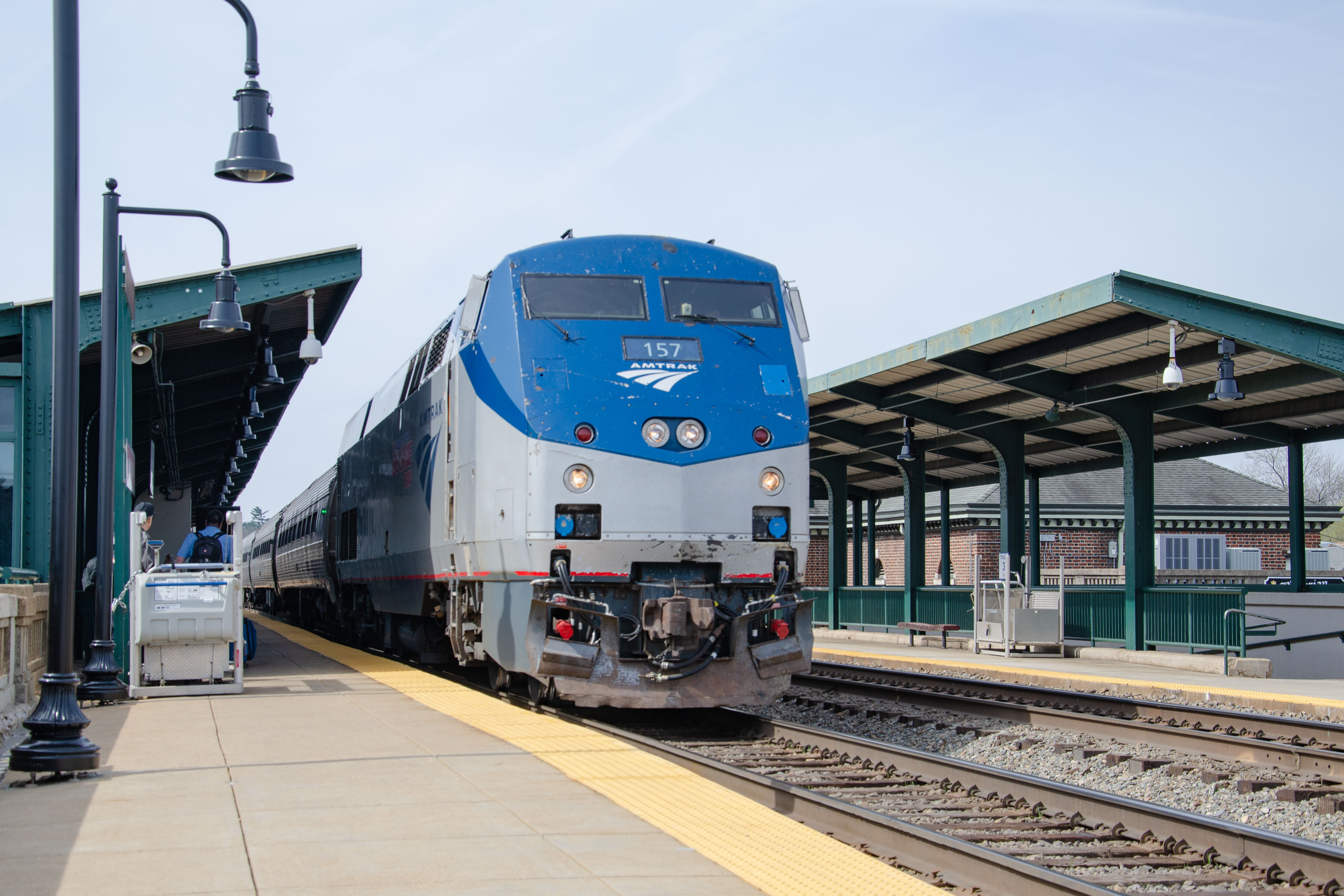
Amtrak Northeast Regional at the station

The RF&P's passenger service was taken over by Amtrak in 1971. Local service was re-introduced by Virginia Railway Express in 1992 when the station became the southern terminus of the Fredericksburg Line. Since 1997, the station building has been occupied by restaurants. The Fredericksburg Line was extended south to a new terminus at Spotsylvania station in November 2015.

The station underwent a major restoration project between 2010 and 2011. In June 2017, the VRE board approved spending up to $431,000 to repair the western sections of platform. A $14.4 million project completed in 2024 included this work as well as rehabilitation of four rail bridges, construction of new stairs to a parking lot, and accessibility improvements to one elevator. Plans for the Southeast High Speed Rail Corridor call for a third track and an expanded station slightly to the east. As part of the environmental permitting for that project, the station was evaluated for potential listing on the National Register of Historic Places, for which it was found to be eligible.
