= Potomac Steamboat Company =

19th-century United States shipping company

The Potomac Steamboat Company served as the direct water link between the Richmond, Fredericksburg and Potomac Railroad (at Aquia Creek) and the Baltimore and Ohio Railroad (at Washington, DC) from 1845 and 1872. Its predecessor was the Washington and Fredericksburg Steamboat Company, renamed after the RF&P acquired majority control. After May 1, 1872, the connection was made at Quantico Creek.
