= Olive, Virginia =

Unincorporated community in Virginia, US

Olive
- unincorporated community
- Interactive map of Olive
- Coordinates: 38°13′10″N 77°26′28″W
- Country: United States
- State: Virginia
- County: Spotsylvania

Olive is an unincorporated community in Spotsylvania County, in the U.S. state of Virginia.
