= Spotsylvania station =

Rail station in Spotsylvania County, Virginia

Spotsylvania
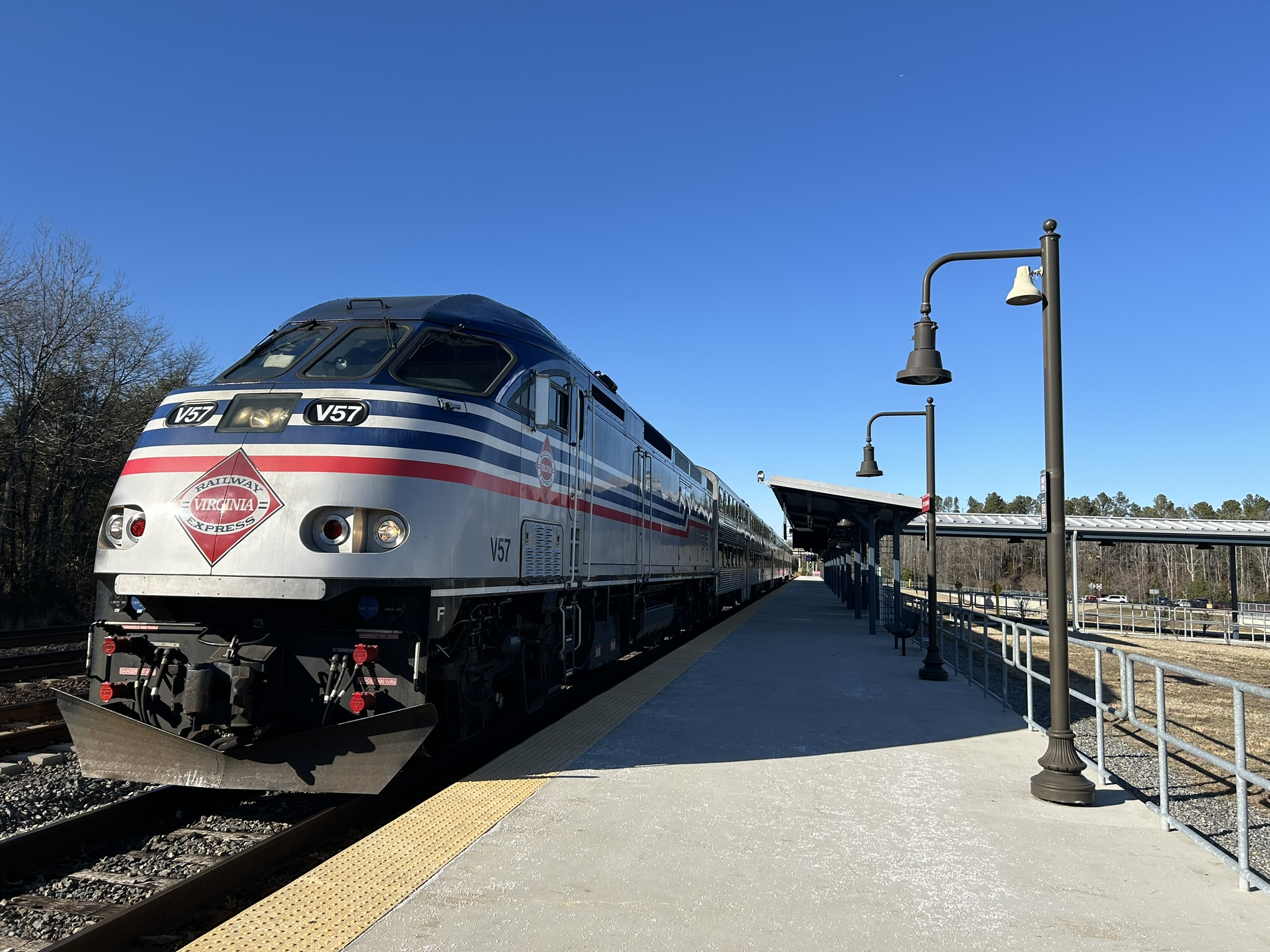
- A VRE train at Spotsylvania station in 2025

General information
- Location: 9442 Crossroads Parkway; Olive (Fredericksburg), Virginia; United States
- Coordinates: 38.2214°N 77.4410°W
- Owner: Spotsylvania County
- Operator: Virginia Railway Express
- Line: RF&P Subdivision
- Platforms: 1 side platform
- Tracks: 3

Construction
- Parking: 1,500 spaces
- Accessible: yes

Other information
- Fare zone: 9

History
- Opened: November 16, 2015

Passengers
- 2015: 1,300 daily (expected)

Services
Preceding station	Virginia Railway Express	Following station
Terminus	Fredericksburg Line	Fredericksburg toward Union Station
Location

Spotsylvania station is a commuter rail station on the Virginia Railway Express Fredericksburg Line, located off US Route 17 in Spotsylvania County, Virginia, about 5 miles (8 km) south of downtown Fredericksburg in the unincorporated community of Olive (with a Fredericksburg mailing address). It opened on November 16, 2015 – the first extension of VRE service since its opening.

The station consists of a 700-foot (210 m)-long low-level platform with a canopy and a small headhouse with restrooms. The station has 1500 parking spaces for commuters.

== History ==
=== Initial plans ===
Since its opening in July 1992, the Fredericksburg Line had terminated at its namesake city. Spotsylvania was not included in the 1992 VRE network because the county was not part of the original funding district. However, the Fredericksburg lot served a substantial number of commuters from Spotsylvania County – between 900 and 1000 daily by 2012. This caused capacity problems at the lot and prevented local residents from parking there. In 2004, VRE's Strategic Plan indicated the possibility of a station in Spotsylvania at a Route 17 site, citing existing ridership from the county and the need for increased parking, as well as noting that the extension could be constructed relatively cheaply, allowing for near-term implementation.

=== Joining VRE ===
On August 18, 2009, the Spotsylvania County Board of Supervisors voted to join VRE. In September 2009, they additionally voted to join its associated funding district, the Potomac and Rappahannock Transportation Commission (PRTC). The North Virginia Transportation Commission (NVTC) approved the decision (which included provisions for a VRE station in Spotsylvania) in November 2009, and Spotsylvania joined VRE and the PRTC in February 2010. In August 2010, a Spotsylvania-funded study indicated that a site just south of Route 17 was the optimum location for the station. The Spotsylvania County Board of Supervisors approved the site in October 2010.

=== Planning and delays ===
The VRE board issued preliminary approval of the extension in June 2012 and devoted about $400,000 in VRE funds to the project.

A Department of Environmental Quality public comment period regarding the third track lasted from January to February 2013. Design work started in June 2012 and was finished by March 2013. In March 2013, the VRE board voted to issue an invitation for bids, due in May 2013. On May 17, the board issued a $2.349 million contract to Hammerhead Construction for station construction, with work intended to begin in June. A $8 million contract for the third track was awarded in June. A $20 million contract with CSX Transportation was approved in September 2013; this signing allowed construction but work did not yet begin.

The station was originally planned to open in December 2013, but this was delayed several times. A completion date of March 2014 with the third track several months later was announced in September 2013. A later date of June 2014 was announced in November 2013 due to delays in negotiations, as the owners of the property upon which the third track and parking lot will be built disputed the price they were to be paid for the land. Construction on the third track started in early 2014, but not on the parking lot and station, due to a continued lack of agreement. In May 2014, VDOT took over negotiations from the county, as the state agency had more power of eminent domain.

In July 2014, VDOT filed a certificate of take in a county court, which the property owners consented to; this allowed the land to be transferred even without a final agreement on the sale price. Bidding for the parking lot and roadway construction opened on July 25, 2014, with bids due on August 27. The $7.3 million lowest bid was selected in September 2014.

=== Construction ===
A groundbreaking ceremony was held on August 12, 2014. By then the third track and station were to be complete by February 2015, but parking lot construction would take eight months to complete, further delaying opening until July 2015. At the groundbreaking, officials stated that the station might open as soon as December 2014 even if the parking lot was not yet complete, but this did not come to fruition.

In March 2015, the VRE board voted to terminate the $8.7 million contract with one company, which had been working on the third track project, due to numerous safety violations. The termination was expected to delay the third track but not the station opening. Negotiations about the cost of the parking land failed in 2015; the case will go to trial in May 2016. By July 2015 the station was planned to open in September, though work on the third track did not resume until August 2015.

=== Opening ===
On October 26, 2015, VRE announced that the station would open at the start of service on November 16, 2015. The station saw full service on the 16th, with a mid-morning ribbon-cutting ceremony. It was the first extension of VRE service since the system opened in 1992, but not the first station added to the system – Lorton and Franconia–Springfield opened as infill stations in the mid-1990s.

During the first week of operations, daily ridership at Spotsylvania averaged 550 boardings. The third track opened on May 17, 2016. Later that month, an agreement for a price of $3 million – substantially higher than VRE's original offer – was reached for the purchase of the parking lot property. In July 2025, VRE turned over part of the property to the county for a symbolic $10 payment.

== Funding ==
The station itself cost $3.4 million to build, while the associated 2.6 miles (4.2 km) of third track with high-speed crossovers cost $32.5 million. The project was funded by state funds and by Spotsylvania County. Funding for operations on the extension comes from Spotsylvania County. In August 2012, the county announced that revenues from bond sales would be used to fund the extension.

VRE oversaw the design and construction of the station for the county.
