= Potomac and Rappahannock Transportation Commission =

Public transportation system in Virginia, United States

OmniRide

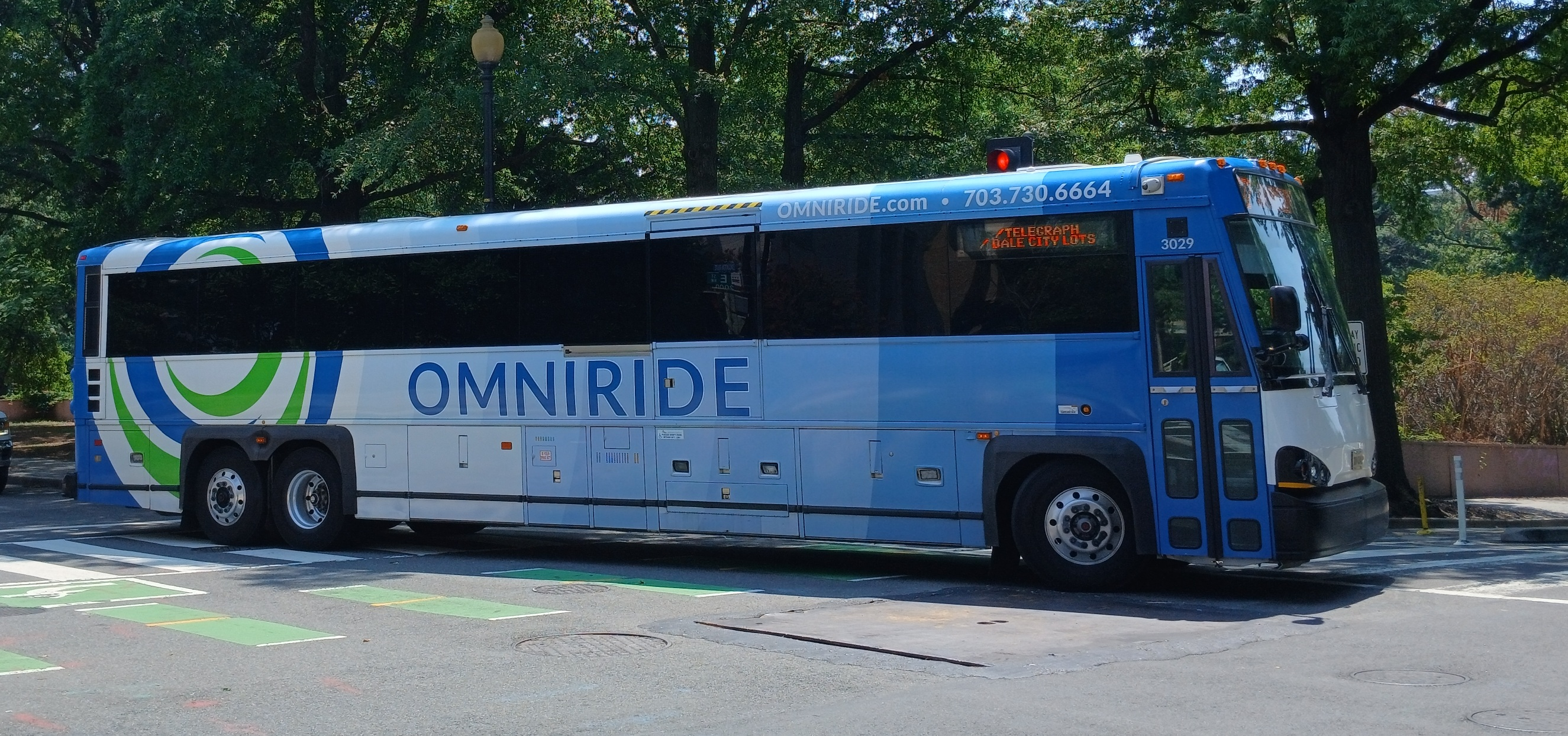
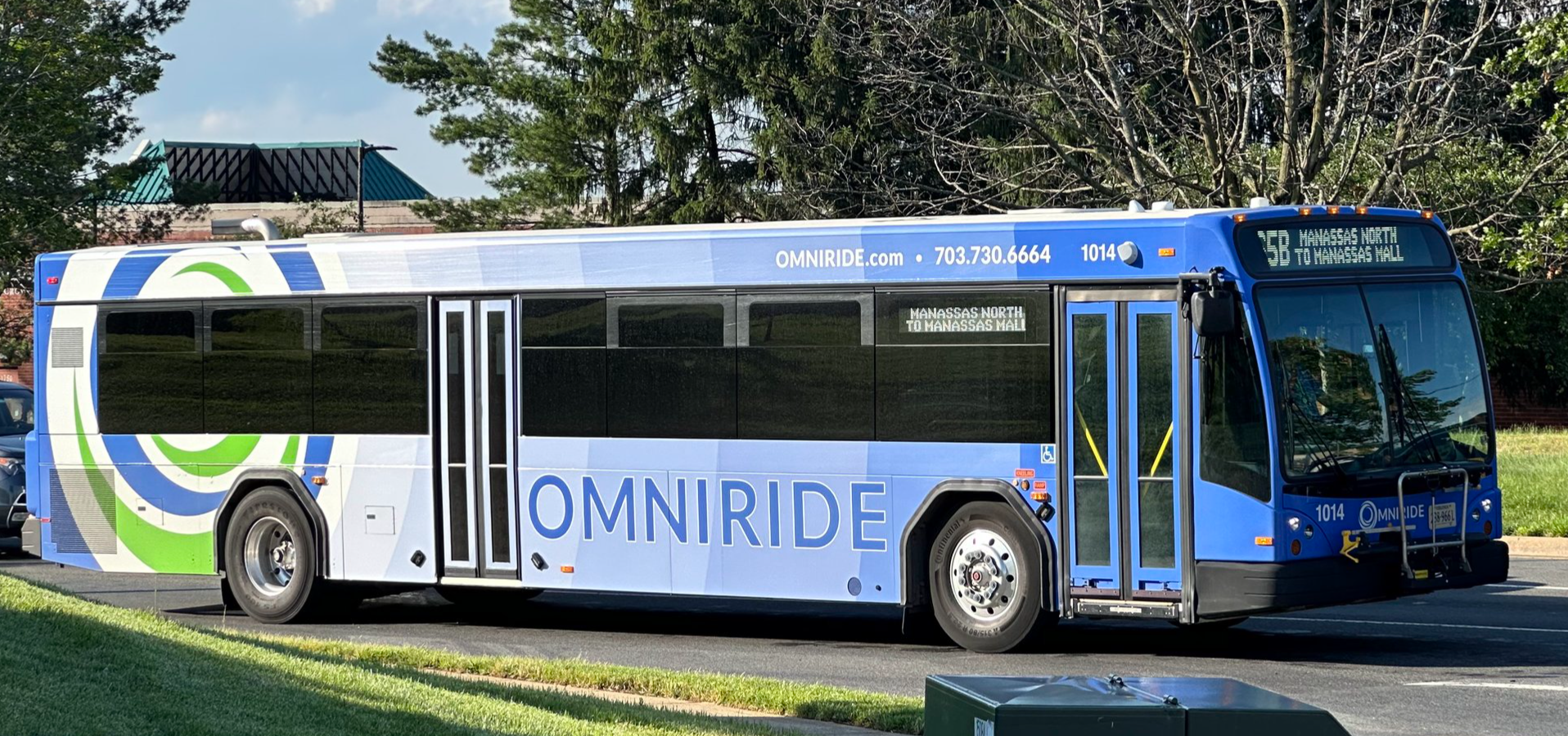
- OmniRide services: Express and Local
- Founded: 1986
- Headquarters: 14700 Potomac Mills Road, Woodbridge, Virginia, U.S.
- Service type: Commuter bus; Local bus; Microtransit; Paratransit
- Routes: 13
- Fleet: 168 buses
- Daily ridership: 9,200 (weekdays, Q4 2025)
- Annual ridership: 2,533,300 (2025)
- Fuel type: Diesel
- Operator: Keolis
- Website: omniride.com

OmniRide is a public transit service in the Northern Virginia suburbs of Washington, D.C., serving 3 counties and 3 independent cities along the Potomac and Rappahannock rivers. OmniRide service is provided by the Potomac and Rappahannock Transportation Commission, a transportation district under Virginia law that is funded in part by fuel taxes collected by its member jurisdictions.

Members of PRTC include the counties of Prince William, Spotsylvania, and Stafford along with the independent cities of Fredericksburg, Manassas and Manassas Park. OmniRide bus services are operated under contract by Keolis. PRTC contributes funding to the Virginia Railway Express commuter rail service, which is also operated by Keolis.

OmniRide operates an extensive network of commuter bus services under the OmniRide Express brand, which operate along the I-66 and I-95 corridors. OmniRide Local service consists of two separate networks in Manassas and eastern Prince William County, which are connected by the East-West Express route on the Prince William Parkway. In 2025, the system had a ridership of 2,533,300, or about 9,200 per weekday as of the fourth quarter of 2025.

== Organization ==
The Commission was established in 1986. It consists of representatives from each local jurisdiction, the Chairman of the Commonwealth Transportation Board and two members of the House of Delegates and one member of the Senate from the related legislative districts. Together with the Northern Virginia Transportation Commission, PRTC operates the Virginia Railway Express. By 1986, it became apparent that the jurisdictions outside of NVTC could not reach agreement on how to support VRE by joining NVTC so PRTC was created. Legislation established a 2% motor fuels tax to support VRE expenses and other transportation investments.

PRTC operates a carpooling and vanpooling project called "OmniRide Ridesharing Service" (formerly "OmniMatch", Now as of March 13th, 2025: "OmniRide Connect"). PRTC participates in the SmarTrip rechargeable fare card program with other public transportation agencies.

== Routes ==
For more information, call (703) 730-6664 or (888) 730-6664 or via Virginia Relay Center - TDD, call 711, Monday-Friday, 5:30AM to 8:30PM.

=== OmniRide Express ===
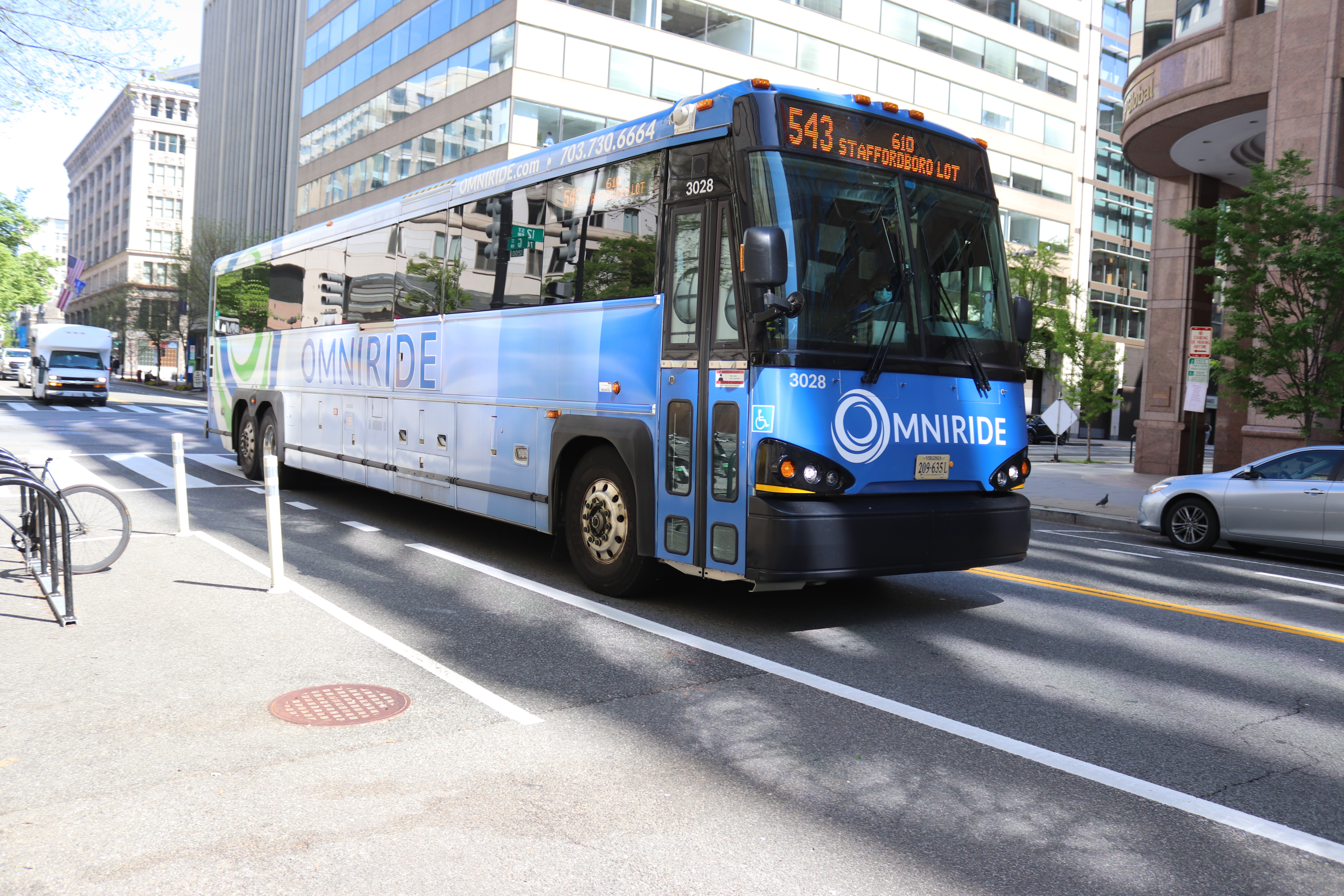
543 Stafford-Washington express commuter bus along G Street NW, Washington D.C.

- 971 Dale City-Washington: Connecting service between Dale City and Downtown Washington
- 972 Dale City-Pentagon & Rosslyn/Ballston: Connecting service between Dale City and the Pentagon/Rosslyn/Ballston area
- 563 Woodbridge-Navy Yard: Connecting service between Woodbridge and Washington Navy Yard
- 611 Gainesville-Washington: Connecting service between Gainesville and Downtown Washington
- 612 Gainesville-Pentagon-L'Enfant Plaza-Navy Yard: Connecting service between Gainesville and the Pentagon
- 618 Gainesville - Dulles Corridor/Herndon/Reston: Connecting service between Manassas and Dulles Corridor/Herndon/Reston
- 622 Haymarket-Rosslyn/Ballston: Haymarket buses connect Haymarket to the Rosslyn Ballston Corridor, via I-66
- 981 Lake Ridge-Washington: Connecting service between Lake Ridge and Downtown Washington
- 953 Montclair - Washington: Connecting service between Montclair and Downtown Washington
- 952 Montclair - Pentagon: Connecting service between Montclair and Pentagon
- 943 Stafford-Washington: Connecting service between Stafford and Downtown Washington.
- 942 Stafford-Pentagon: Connecting service between Stafford and Pentagon.
- 541 Stafford-Washington State Dept: Connecting service between Stafford and Washington DC
- 932 Falmouth-Rosslyn/Ballston: Connecting service between Falmouth and Rosslyn/Ballston with transfer to Crystal City.
- 923 Spotsylvania-Washington Navy Yard: Connecting service between Spotsylvania and Washington DC Navy Yard.

=== OmniRide Metro Express (formerly Metro Direct) ===
- 95 Prince William Metro Express: Connecting service between Dale City, Woodbridge and Franconia-Springfield
- 60 Manassas Metro Express: Connecting service between Manassas and Tysons Metro Station

=== OmniRide Local ===
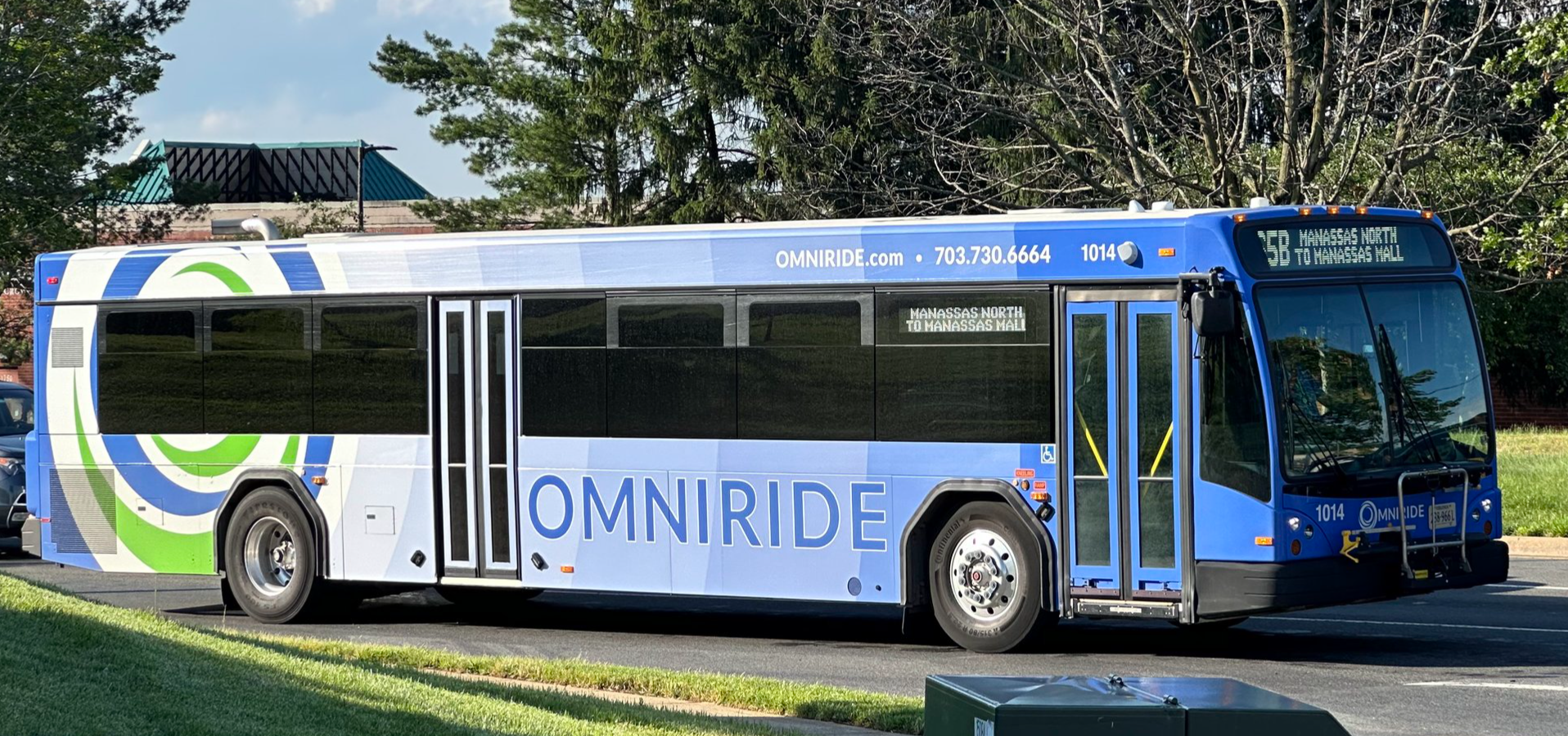
Route 65B, a now discontinued local bus route in Manassas heading south to the PWC Courthouse Transfer Hub near old town.

- 91 Dale City: Connects Dale City to Lake Ridge, Potomac Mills Mall and to OmniRide Transit Center
- 51 Dumfries: Local bus service connecting Montclair to the Town of Dumfries and Triangle
- 52 Dumfries Connector: Connects Dumfries to Woodbridge / Potomac Mills Mall / OmniRide Transit Center
- 92 Lake Ridge: Local bus service between Lake Ridge and Woodbridge
- 94 Lake Ridge Connector: Connects Lake Ridge/Woodbridge to OmniRide Transit Center, NVCC Woodbridge Campus and Rippon VRE
- 65 Manassas-NOVA: Service between downtown Manassas and NVCC Manassas Campus
- 67 Manassas-Manassas Park: Connecting service between Downtown Manassas and Manasass Park VRE
- 52 Route 1: Connects Woodbridge VRE to the Town of Dumfries, stopping by Ferlazzo and NVCC Woodbridge Campus
- 93 Woodbridge: Connects Lake Ridge to Woodbridge to Potomac Mills Mall/Smoketown Plaza

=== OmniRide East-West Express ===
- 96 East-West Express: East-West Express buses connect eastern Prince William and the Manassas area, via Prince William Parkway
