= RF&P Subdivision =

Railroad line between Virginia and Washington, DC

RF&P Subdivision

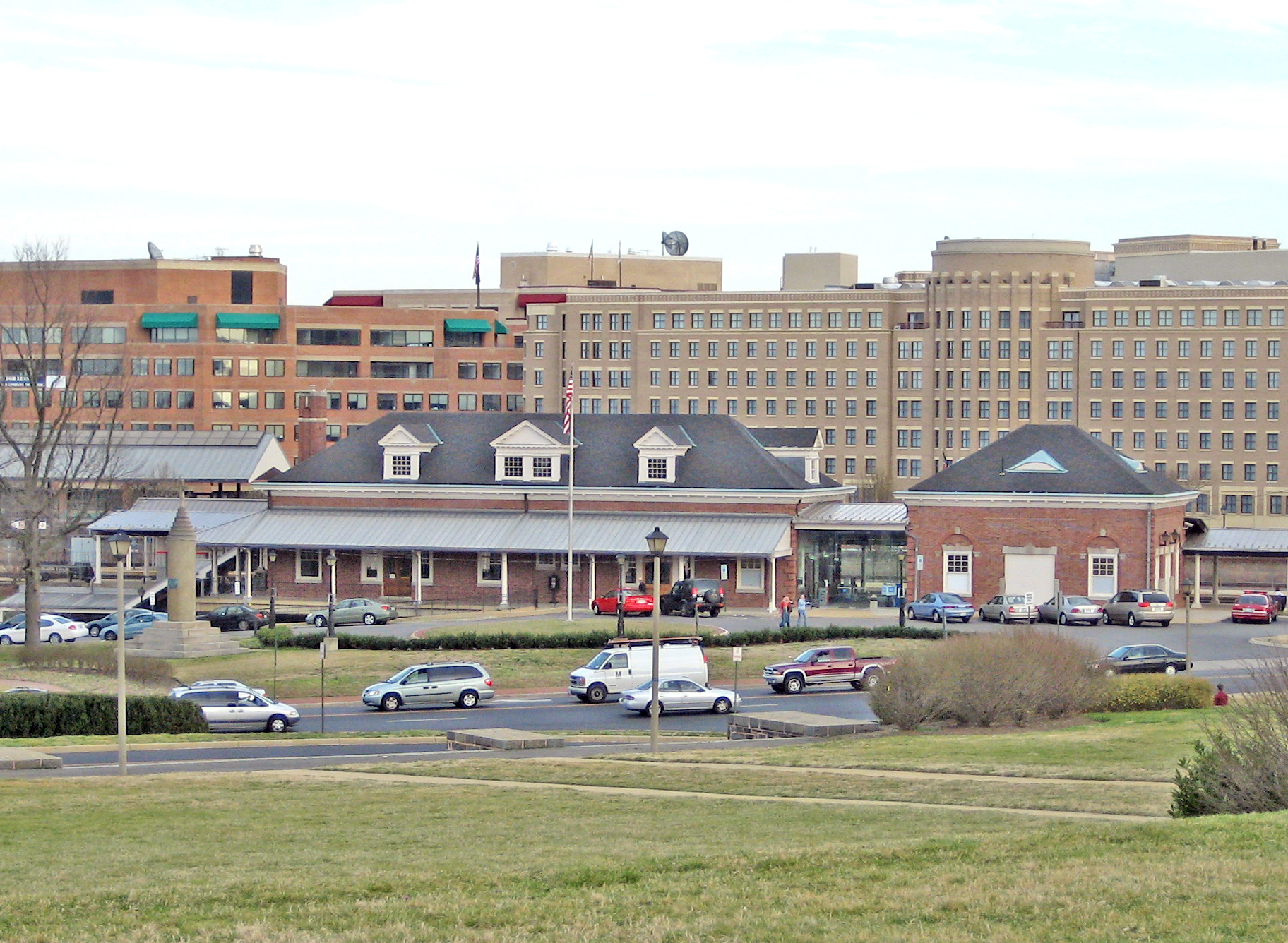
Alexandria Union Station, served by Amtrak and Virginia Railway Express

The RF&P Subdivision is a railroad line operated by CSX Transportation and jointly owned by CSX and Virginia. It runs from Washington, D.C., to Richmond, Virginia, over lines previously owned by the Pennsylvania Railroad and the Richmond, Fredericksburg and Potomac Railroad. The line's name pays homage to that railroad, which was a predecessor to the CSX.

== Route description ==
At the northern (eastern) end of the line, the RF&P Sub connects to the Capital Subdivision, which runs to Baltimore, Maryland. Just before the Anacostia Railroad Bridge on the Capital Sub is the Virginia Avenue Tunnel. South (west) of the tunnel is a branch to the Amtrak First Street Tunnel, which leads to Washington Union Station and the Northeast Corridor. The Virginia Avenue Tunnel is used only for freight trains, while the First Street Tunnel is used only for passenger trains.

Continuing south, the RF&P Sub crosses the Potomac River over the Long Bridge into Northern Virginia, and passes through Alexandria and Fredericksburg stations, ending in Richmond at the Richmond Terminal Subdivision.

== Operations ==
The RF&P Sub is part of CSX Transportation's eastern seaboard line, and carries freight trains, as well as passenger trains for Amtrak and Virginia Railway Express (VRE). Freight traffic capacity on the subdivision has been improved by the modernization of the Virginia Avenue Tunnel. The tunnel is now double-tracked and has a higher vertical clearance, which allows the use of double-stack freight cars. South of Long Bridge is triple tracked until Franconia Station where it reduces to double track.

== Proposed modifications ==
In 2008 CSX proposed improvements to the RF&P Sub in what would be a public-private partnership, as part of its National Gateway initiative. The improvements would enable use of double-stack cars, and include a modified or rebuilt tunnel, and lowering of track levels at several presently-restricted roadway overpasses.

In 2019, the Commonwealth of Virginia announced that they would purchase track from CSX along the subdivision in order to expand passenger rail service. The acquisition included half of the existing right-of-way and 39 miles of existing 3rd and 4th tracks; this accompanied and cemented existing plans to build a new passenger-only span at Long Bridge, expanding stations along the line, and adding additional passenger-only sidings and tracks. The partial sale was completed in 2021.

== See also ==
- List of CSX Transportation lines
