= Commonwealth Corridor =

Proposed Amtrak route

Overview
- Service type: Inter-city rail
- Status: Proposed
- Locale: Virginia
- First service: 2030s-2040
- Current operator: Amtrak
- Website: drpt.virginia.gov/studies-and-reports/corridor-identification-and-development-program/

Route
- Termini: Newport News, Virginia; Christiansburg, Virginia

Technical
- Track gauge: 4 ft 8 1/2 in (1,435 mm) standard gauge

The Commonwealth Corridor is a proposed east-west inter-city passenger rail service in the U.S. state of Virginia. This project aims to establish a service between Newport News and a new station in the New River Valley. The route will pass through key cities such as Roanoke, Charlottesville, Richmond, and Williamsburg, as well as several universities such as the College of William & Mary and the University of Virginia.

A study conducted by the Virginia Department of Rail and Public Transportation estimated that the project would require $416.5 million in 2030 money for "known infrastructure costs required to initiate passenger service on the Commonwealth Corridor." However, if and when it is completed, it would have a projected annual ridership of 177,200 passengers in 2040.

The proposed route has been included in the Federal Railroad Administration’s Corridor Identification and Development Program, which allocated $500,000 towards conducting and preparing the line.

To enhance the route and future services, the Virginia Passenger Rail Authority plans to acquire the right of way from Richmond to Charlottesville and from Roanoke to New River Valley.

== History ==
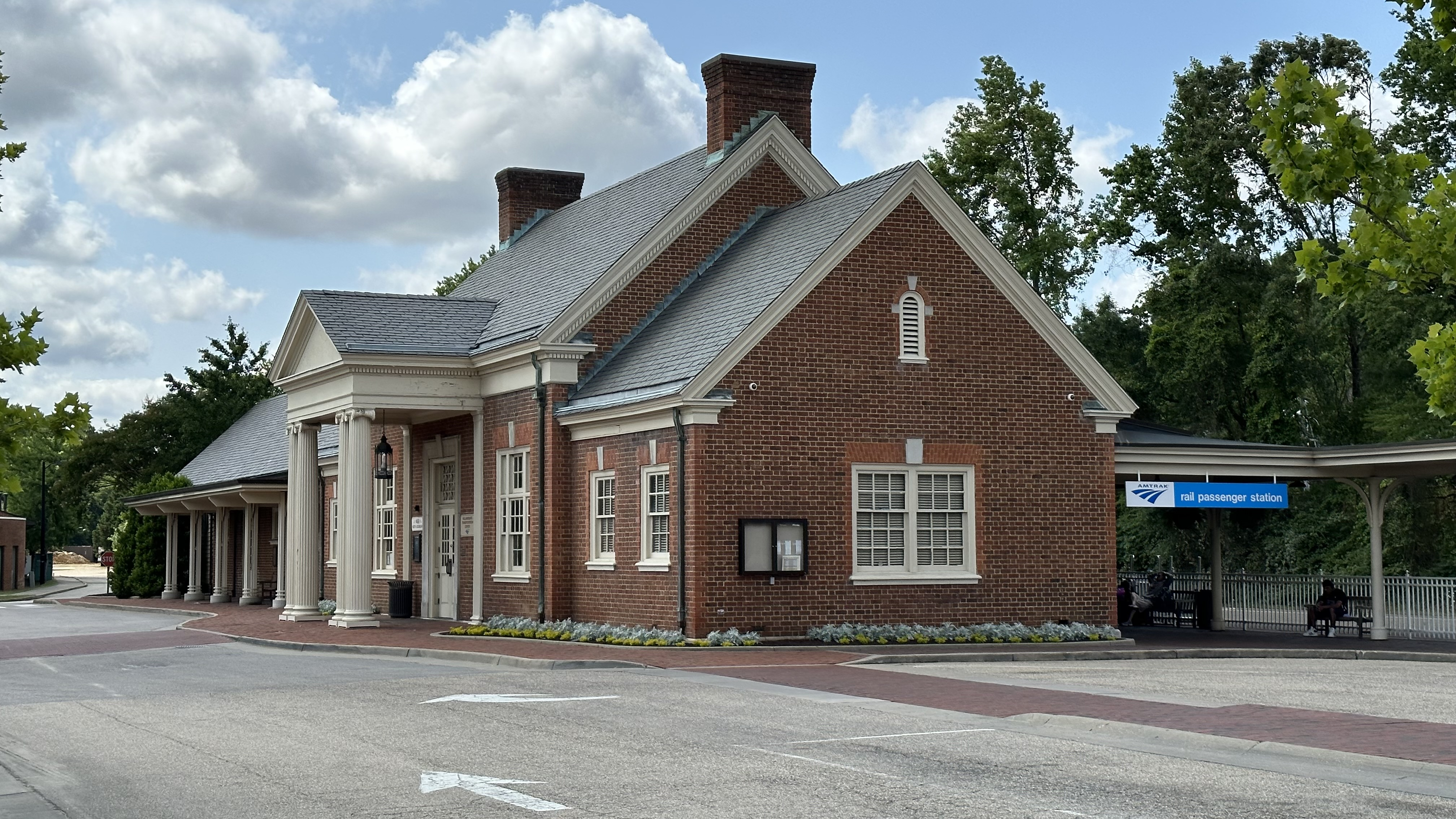
Amtrak's Williamsburg station. This station is served by the Northeast Regional and is set to be a station for the route.

The trackage between Charlottesville Union Station and Newport News, Virginia had previously been served by a branch of Amtrak's James Whitcomb Riley, a long-distance train to Chicago. However, due to it not making enough money, the Newport News section of the James Whitcomb Riley was discontinued in 1976, with the train's other branch, to Washington Union Station, becoming the Cardinal the next year.

On January 5, 2018, Virginians for High-Speed Rail, the Southern Environmental Law Center (SELC), the Hampton Roads Chamber, and New River Valley Rail 2020 coalition released a report for increased passenger rail service in Virginia,. Later that year, SELC, Virginians for High-Speed Rail, Virginia 21, and the Hampton Roads Chamber and Roanoke Regional Chamber of Commerce unveiled the Commonwealth Corridor, a proposal for passenger rail from Norfolk and Newport News to Christiansburg. Their report highlighted the environmental and touristic advantages of the new service, as well as other benefits such as servicing universities, jobs, and military bases, relieving traffic, and increasing railroad ridership.

In 2021, as part of the Transforming Rail in Virginia program, the Commonwealth of Virginia bought multiple CSX Transportation lines, including half of the RF&P Subdivision, the out-of-service S-Line, and the Buckingham Branch line between Doswell and Clifton Forge.

In 2022, Governor Glenn Youngkin expressed his full support for the Commonwealth Corridor.

As of 2024, the Virginia Conservation Network estimates that the Commonwealth Corridor could be completed by 2040 if it relied only on state funding, but if $2 billion in federal funding from President Joe Biden's infrastructure bill were assigned to it, then it could open in the 2030s.

In April 2025, Youngkin broke ground on the New River Valley Project, the plan to build a new station at Christiansburg station to serve the New River Valley. The Northeast Regional's current service to Roanoke is scheduled to be extended to Christiansburg in 2027.

In 2026, the Shenandoah Valley Bicycle Coalition endorsed the plan for the Commonwealth Corridor.

== See also ==
- Amtrak Virginia
- Southeast High Speed Rail Corridor
- Long Bridge (Potomac River)
- Virginia Central Railroad
