= Bedford station (Virginia) =

Bedford, VA
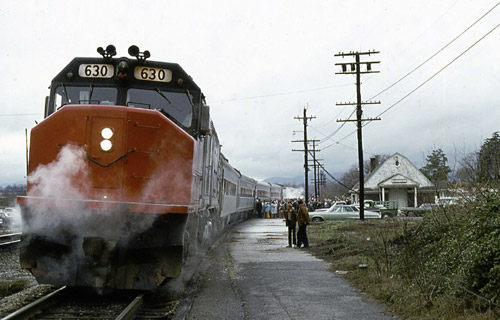
- The Mountaineer at Bedford in March 1975

General information
- Location: 515 Bedford Avenue; Bedford, Virginia
- Coordinates: 37°20′13.75″N 79°31′39.43″W
- Platforms: 1 side platform
- Tracks: 2

History
- Opened: March 24, 1975
- Closed: April 30, 1971; October 1, 1979

Former services
Preceding station	Amtrak	Following station
Roanoke toward Tri-State	Hilltopper	Lynchburg (Woodall Road) toward Boston South
Roanoke toward Chicago	Mountaineer	Lynchburg (Woodall Road) toward Norfolk
Preceding station	Norfolk and Western Railway	Following station
Thaxton toward Cincinnati	Main Line	Forest toward Norfolk

Future services
Preceding station	Amtrak	Following station
Roanoke toward Christiansburg	Northeast Regional	Lynchburg toward Boston South or Springfield
Location

Bedford station was an intercity rail station located in Bedford, Virginia. It was served by Norfolk and Western Railway passenger trains until 1971. It was later served by Amtrak's Mountaineer from 1975 to 1977, then the Hilltopper until 1979. The station building remains extant and is used as a restaurant.

== History ==
The Virginia and Tennessee Railroad was built through Bedford in 1857; stations at Bedford were served for over a century. Even as local service petered out in the 1960s, the Norfolk and Western Railway (N&W) continued to run the crack Norfolk–Cincinnati Pocahontas and the local station counterpart on the same route, the Powhatan Arrow. The N&W also operated the Birmingham–Washington Birmingham Special (unnamed after February 1970 and cut back to Bristol in August 1970), the New Orleans-Washington Pelican (discontinued, 1970) and the Memphis-bound Tennessean. When Amtrak took over intercity passenger rail service on May 1, 1971, it chose not to continue service on these trains, thus ending service to Bedford.

=== Amtrak service ===
Service was restored on March 24, 1975, with the introduction of the Mountaineer service between Norfolk and Chicago. The Mountaineer was replaced by the Hilltopper on June 1, 1977. The Hilltopper was discontinued on October 1, 1979, ending rail service to Bedford for the second time. The station building was later repurposed as a restaurant.

=== Proposed new service ===
Amtrak's Northeast Regional service was extended to Roanoke station on October 31, 2017. The town of Bedford requested an intermediate station stop, but this was denied because of low projected ridership. However, in 2016, the town hired a consultant to further study the potential for a station.

In 2021, a study for the restoration of Bedford station was completed. The new station would take $10.9 million to complete. The Virginia Department of Rail and Public Transportation estimated ridership at a restored Bedford station at 10,050 new riders per year (28 per day). Proposed station improvements include a high-level boarding platform and a designated passenger drop-off area.

In October 2024, the town was awarded a $1.5 million federal grant to build for project development.
