= Amtrak Virginia =

Amtrak train routes in Virginia, US

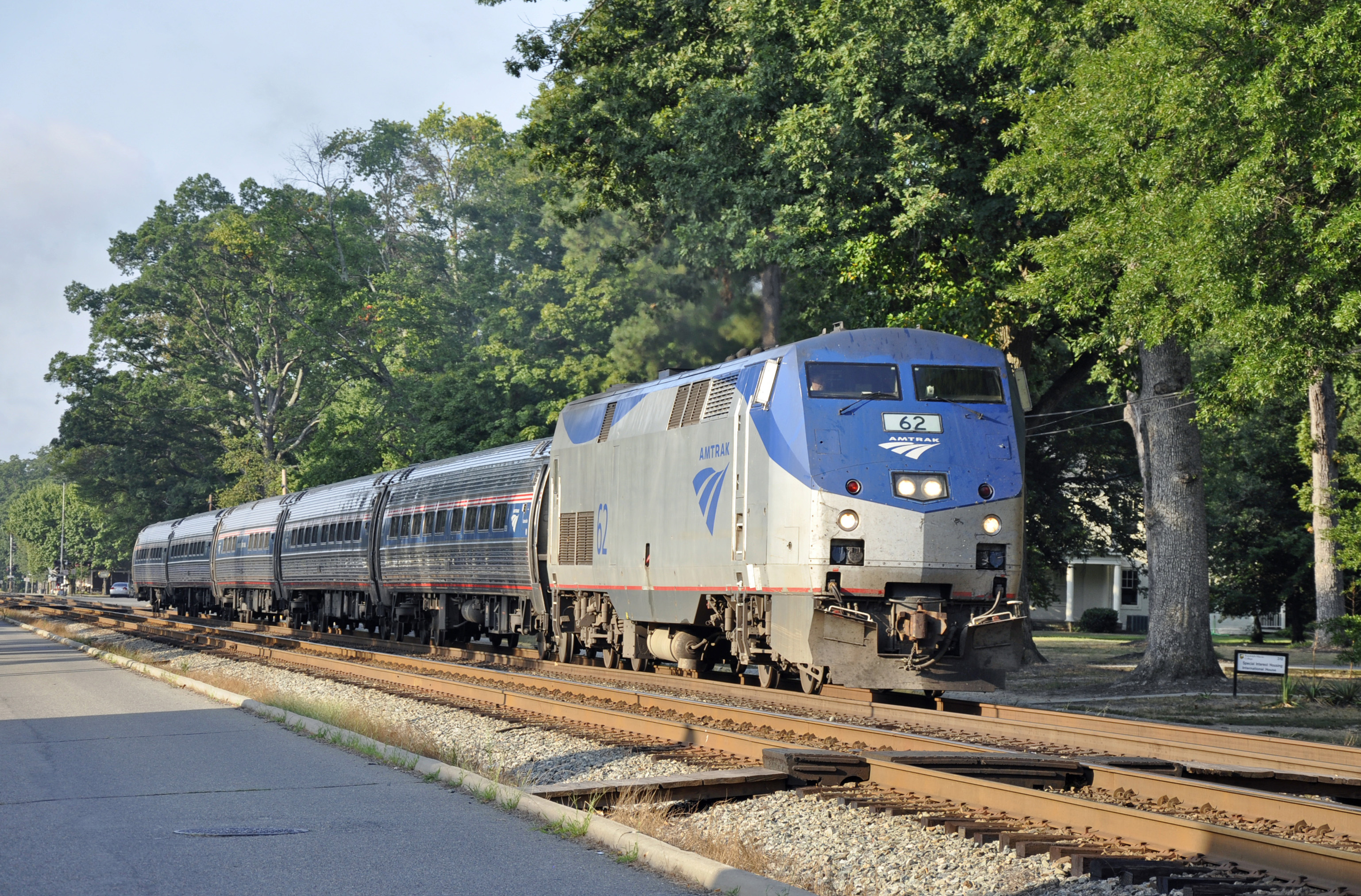
- Northeast Regional in Ashland, Virginia

Overview
- Locale: Virginia
- Transit type: Inter-city rail
- Number of lines: 4
- Annual ridership: 1,451,276 (2025)
- Website: Amtrak Virginia

Operation
- Began operation: 2009
- Operator: Amtrak

Technical
- Track gauge: 4 ft 8 1/2 in (1,435 mm) standard gauge

Amtrak Virginia is the collective name for Virginia's state-supported Amtrak train service, all of which falls under the Northeast Regional brand. Amtrak Virginia trains run between Washington, D.C., and one of four southern termini: Richmond, Newport News, Norfolk, or Roanoke. Trains generally continue north from D.C. along the Northeast Corridor, providing one-seat rides from Virginia to Baltimore, Philadelphia, New York City, and Boston.

The Virginia Passenger Rail Authority has overseen Amtrak Virginia since 2020.

== History ==
After Amtrak took over intercity passenger service on May 1, 1971, rail service in Virginia was limited to a small number of long-distance trains, where they were often not suited to regional travel. Regional service south to Newport News began on June 14, 1976, when Amtrak ended the Newport News section of the James Whitcomb Riley and the Colonial was added in its place with two daily round trips from Boston to Newport News via Alexandria, Richmond and Williamsburg.

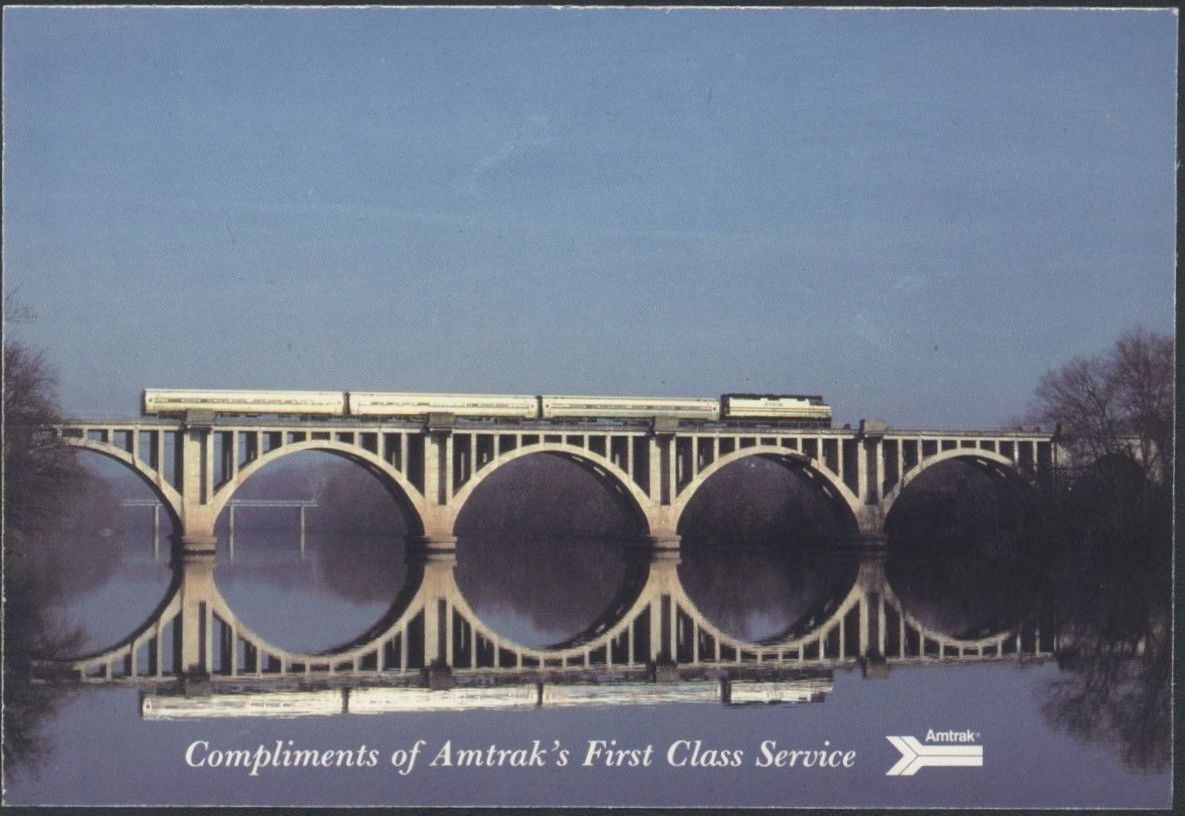
The Colonial at Fredericksburg in the 1980s

Virginia and Amtrak partnered in 2009 under the brand Amtrak Virginia to expand passenger rail service within the Commonwealth, making Virginia the 15th state to fund state services in addition to federally funded routes. One daily Northeast Regional round trip was extended from Washington to Lynchburg via Manassas and Charlottesville on October 1, 2009, supplementing the existing Crescent service. In the first month, ridership doubled expectations. On July 20, 2010, Amtrak added an additional Northeast Regional frequency from Washington to Richmond Staples Mill Road station, increasing the Washington-Richmond corridor to eight daily round trips with hourly northbound morning service.

A further extension south from Richmond to Norfolk along Norfolk Southern tracks was planned by the Department of Rail & Public Transportation (DRPT), and the Commonwealth of Virginia in cooperation with Amtrak. Certain track upgrades (e.g., passing sidings, replacing track to increase operating speeds) between Richmond and Norfolk that were necessary to enable this extension were funded jointly by Norfolk Southern and DRPT. Service started on December 12, 2012. A second daily Norfolk round trip on weekdays was added on March 4, 2019. Schedules for the Newport News trains are also being modified to improve service to the Hampton Roads region.

On August 9, 2013, it was announced that Amtrak hoped to complete track and infrastructure upgrades in order to bring train service to Roanoke by 2016. The project encountered delays, and by late 2016 service was planned to begin in late 2017 with a single train extended from Lynchburg serving the city daily after construction of the Roanoke station platform, which was to begin in early 2017 and take most of the year. Amtrak began service to Roanoke on October 31, 2017.

In December 2017 the DRPT started the Virginia Breeze, a state bus service operated by Megabus for areas not served by rail. As of May 2023 there are four daily routes that terminate at Washington Union Station, with stops at a few other Amtrak Virginia stations.

On December 19, 2019, Virginia Governor Ralph Northam announced a $3.7 billion program to expand rail service in Virginia, which includes doubling the frequency of Amtrak service between Richmond and Washington. As part of the program, the commonwealth paid CSX Transportation $525 million to purchase 223 miles of track and 386 miles of right-of-way, a deal which was finalized on March 31, 2021. One round trip was extended from Staples Mill to Main Street in September 2021 as the first service expansion under the program. Service changes on July 11, 2022, added a second daily Roanoke round trip and an additional Norfolk weekday round trip (making three round trips on weekdays and two on weekends). That change resulted in July 2022 ridership on the state-supported Virginia routes being 20% higher than June 2022 and 29% higher than July 2019.

=== Expansion ===
Extension of the Roanoke route south to Christiansburg, Virginia, near Virginia Tech, is underway; with further extension to Bristol, Virginia/Tennessee a long-range possibility. Initially, the Virginia Passenger Rail Authority (VPRA) and Norfolk Southern reached an agreement for the state to purchase part of the former Virginian Railway for service to the New River Valley. A station was to be built at Merrimac, between Christiansburg and Blacksburg, with service by 2025. Ultimately, VRPA purchased the Manassas line from Norfolk Southern and Norfolk Southern granted VPRA passenger service rights on the N-Line (ex-Norfolk and Western) with a station at Cambria, closer to Christiansburg. The VRPA indicated this could be done faster and cheaper than service on the Virginian line. Construction started in February 2025. As of June 2026 New River Valley service is expected to begin in 2027. Station renovation will start after service has commenced.

Closed in 1979, Bedford station in Bedford, Virginia, was not reopened as part of the extension to Roanoke. In 2021, the DRPT estimated that an infill station in Bedford would draw 10,050 new riders per year, cost $10.9 million, and could be completed by 2025.

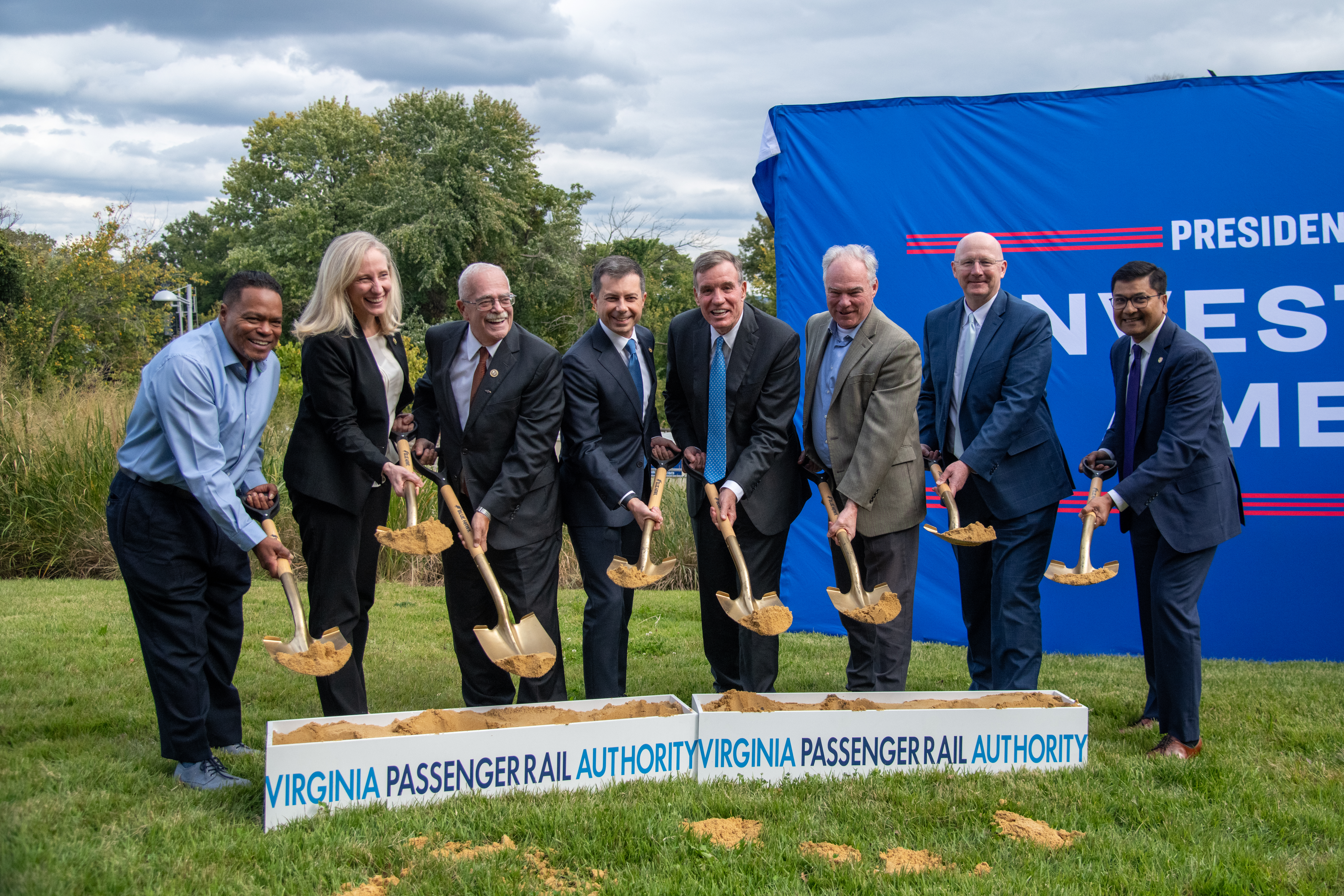
Members of Virginia's Congressional Delegation at a groundbreaking in October 2024

In May 2022, Amtrak and the Virginia Passenger Rail Authority reached an agreement to build an Amtrak platform at Crystal City, currently served by Virginia Railway Express, as part of the station's reconstruction. As of June 2026, final design is underway with construction expected to start by year's end and finish in 2029.

==== Commonwealth Corridor ====
Stakeholders have proposed a new cross-Virginia train along a route designated the Commonwealth Corridor: Newport News–Richmond–Charlottesville–Lynchburg–Roanoke. The service would enable faster east-west travel within the Amtrak Virginia network without the need to travel north, transfer at Alexandria, and return south. The route would use existing rail lines and would also follow the Northeast Regional extension to Christiansburg.

A 2021 feasibility study for the corridor conducted by DRPT estimated that the service would cost $416.5 million to get started, and would generate 177,200 annual riders by 2040. In December 2023, the Federal Railroad Administration accepted an application by the DRPT to enter the Commonwealth Corridor route into its Corridor Identification and Development Program. The program grants $500,000 toward service planning and prioritizes the route for future federal funding.

== Operations ==
=== Services ===
As of 2023, Amtrak Virginia consists of eight Northeast Regional round trips on weekdays, and seven on Saturdays and Sundays. Due to branching, cities receive varying levels of service, with only Alexandria Union Station seeing all trips. For example, Richmond Staples Mill Road sees six weekday round trips while Richmond's more centrally located Main Street Station sees just three, while the remaining three continue Norfolk.

Washington Union Station is the northern limit of state-supported service. From there, trains generally continue onto the Northeast Corridor and terminate at Boston South Station or Springfield Union Station in Massachusetts.

Southern terminus	Weekday round trips	Weekend round trips
Richmond–Main Street	1	1
Newport News	2	2
Norfolk	3	2
Roanoke	2	2
Total	8	7

Amtrak Virginia service is supplemented by Amtrak's federally funded long-distance routes through the state: the Cardinal to Chicago, Crescent to New Orleans, Palmetto to Savannah, Silver Service to Miami, and Auto Train to Sanford. The state-supported Carolinian also runs through Virginia, but is primarily sponsored by North Carolina and falls under the NC by Train brand, not Amtrak Virginia.

=== Trackage ===
All Amtrak Virginia services use the northernmost portion of the ex-Richmond, Fredericksburg and Potomac Railroad (now owned by CSX Transportation) between Washington and Alexandria, Virginia. South of Alexandria, trains to Roanoke use the Norfolk Southern Railway (ex-Southern Railway, ex-Virginia Midland Railway). Trains to Richmond, Norfolk and Newport News use the CSX RF&P, Richmond Terminal, and Bellwood subdivisions between Alexandria and Richmond.

South of Richmond, trains to Newport News use the CSX Peninsula Subdivision. Trains to Norfolk use the CSX North End Subdivision and Norfolk Southern's Norfolk District (ex-Norfolk and Western Railway).
