= Christiansburg station =

Train station in Virginia, United States

Christiansburg, VA
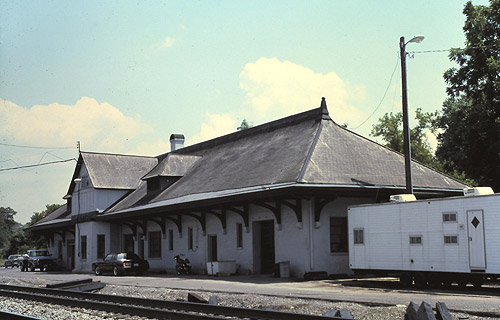
- Christiansburg station in July 1987

General information
- Location: Depot Street NE at East Main Street; Christiansburg, Virginia
- Coordinates: 37°8′28.79″N 80°24′6.35″W
- Line: NS Christiansburg District
- Platforms: 2 side platforms
- Tracks: 2
- Connections: Blacksburg Transit; Valley Metro

History
- Opened: 1857; March 24, 1975
- Opening: 2027 (planned)
- Closed: April 30, 1971; October 1, 1979
- Rebuilt: 1906

Future services
Preceding station	Amtrak	Following station
Terminus	Northeast Regional	Roanoke toward Boston South or Springfield

Former services
Preceding station	Amtrak	Following station
Narrows toward Tri-State	Hilltopper	Roanoke toward Boston South
Narrows toward Chicago	Mountaineer	Roanoke toward Norfolk
Preceding station	Norfolk and Western Railway	Following station
Pearlsburg toward Cincinnati	Main Line	Shawsville toward Norfolk
Location

Christiansburg station is a train station in Christiansburg, Virginia. It was served by Norfolk and Western Railway passenger trains until 1971, the Amtrak Mountaineer from 1975 to 1977, and thereafter the Hilltopper until 1979. Passenger service is scheduled to be restored to the station in 2027 with the extension of Northeast Regional service from Roanoke.

== History ==
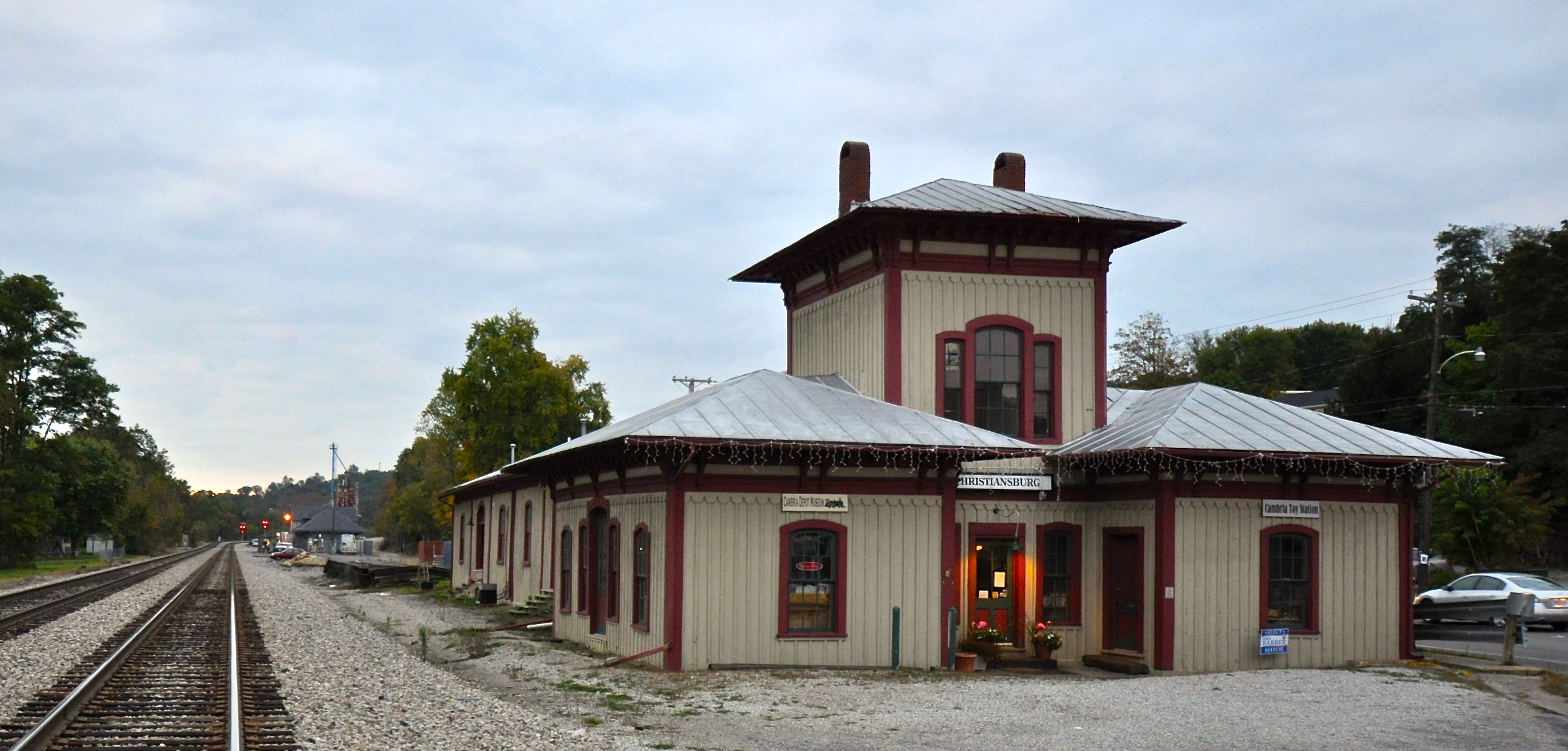
From 1869 to 1906, the station was housed at what is today the Cambria Freight Station

The Virginia and Tennessee Railroad was built through Christiansburg in 1857. Originally planned to go through the town center, it was rerouted to the north due to the concerns of town leaders. A train station was built in Cambria (which was a separate municipality until 1964).

Much of the railroad was destroyed by Union forces during the Civil War. In 1868–69, a larger one-story station was built. That station was itself too small after several decades; a new station was built in 1906, and the older station became the town's freight house.

=== Amtrak service ===
Even as local service petered out in the 1960s, the Norfolk and Western Railway (N&W) continued to run the crack Norfolk–Cincinnati Pocahontas and the local station counterpart on the same route, the Powhatan Arrow. The N&W also operated the Birmingham–Washington Birmingham Special (unnamed after February 1970 and cut back to Bristol in August 1970), the New Orleans-Washington Pelican (discontinued, 1970) and the Memphis-bound Tennessean. When Amtrak took over intercity passenger rail service on May 1, 1971, it chose not to continue service on the two trains, thus ending service to Christiansburg.

Service was restored on March 24, 1975, with the introduction of the Mountaineer between Norfolk and Chicago. The Mountaineer was replaced by the Hilltopper on June 1, 1977. The Hilltopper was discontinued on October 1, 1979, ending rail service to Christiansburg for the second time.

=== Future new service ===
Amtrak's Northeast Regional service was extended to Roanoke station in late 2017. In January 2016, the New River Valley Metropolitan Planning Organization named three sites in Christiansburg – two off Franklin Street and one in Cambria – as possible sites for a station in the New River Valley should service be extended further to Bristol. Sites in Dublin, Pulaski, and Radford were also considered. In May 2016, the town purchased 1 acre (0.40 ha) of residential land off Franklin Street for potential future station use.

In 2021, the Virginia Passenger Rail Authority (VPRA) and Norfolk Southern reached an agreement for the state to purchase part of the former Virginian Railway for service to the New River Valley. A station was to be built at Merrimac, between Christiansburg and Blacksburg, rather than at Franklin Street or Cambria. As of June 2024, however, the VRPA and Norfolk Southern were in negotiations to instead extend service on the N-Line (ex-Norfolk and Western) with a station at Cambria Yard. The VRPA indicated this could be done faster and cheaper than service on the Virginian line.

On April 22, 2025, construction on Christiansburg station officially commenced, with a groundbreaking ceremony attended by Governor Glenn Youngkin being held at the site. The total budget of the project is $326.7 million.
