= Kemper Street station =

Transit station in Virginia, US

Lynchburg Kemper Street
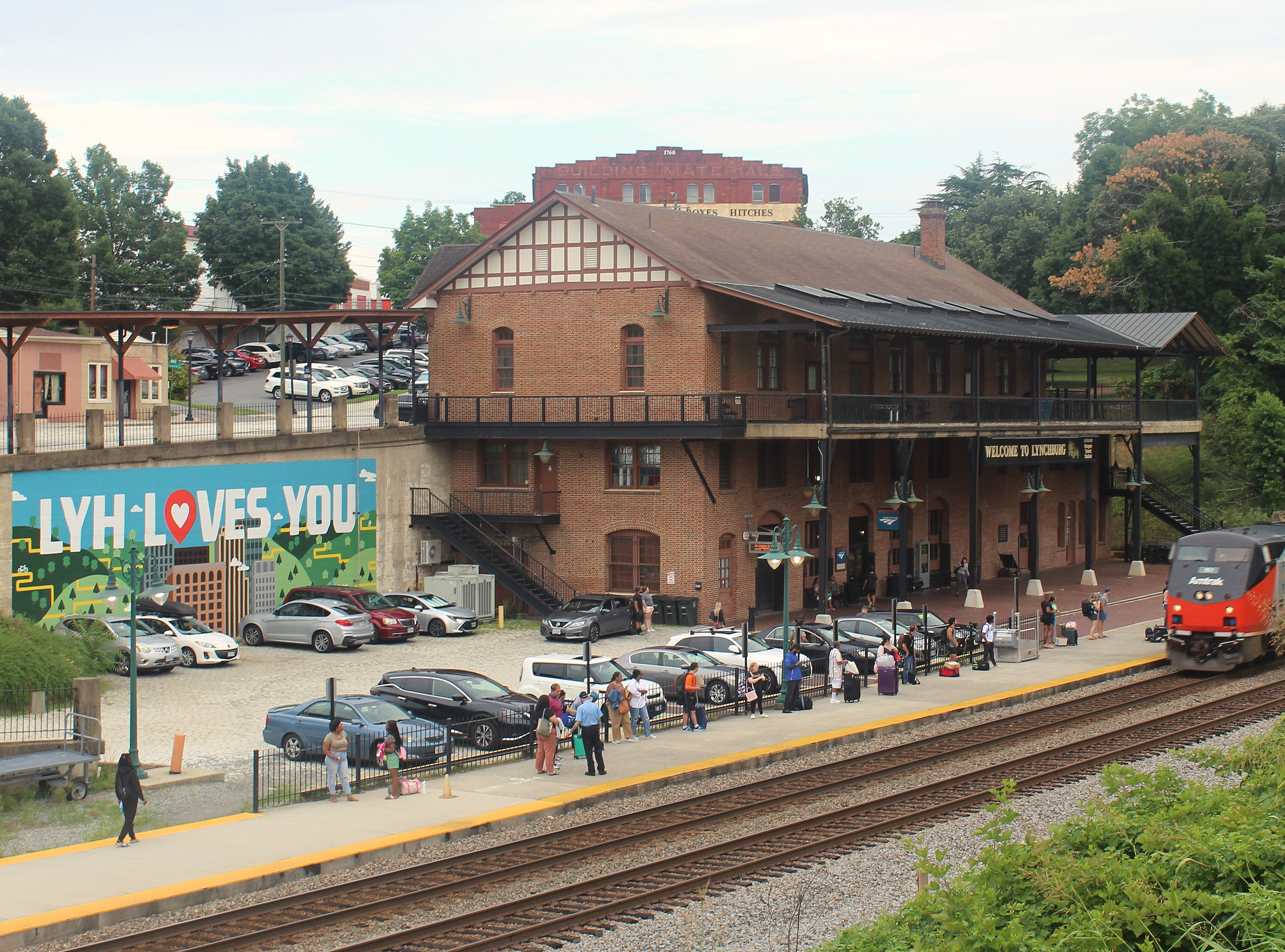
- Amtrak Northeast Regional pulling into station

General information
- Location: 825 Kemper Street; Lynchburg, Virginia; United States
- Coordinates: 37.4064°N 79.1571°W
- Owner: City of Lynchburg
- Line: Norfolk Southern Railway Washington District
- Platforms: 1 island platform
- Tracks: 3
- Connections: Greyhound; GLTC

Construction
- Parking: Available
- Accessible: Yes

Other information
- Station code: Amtrak: LYH

History
- Opened: 1912
- Rebuilt: 2002

Passengers
- FY 2025: 79,575 (Amtrak)

Services
Preceding station	Amtrak	Following station
Danville toward New Orleans	Crescent	Charlottesville toward New York
Roanoke Terminus	Northeast Regional	Charlottesville toward Boston South or Springfield
Former services
Preceding station	Southern Railway	Following station
Durmid toward Birmingham	Main Line	Winesap toward Washington, D.C.
Future services
Preceding station	Amtrak	Following station
Bedford toward Christiansburg	Northeast Regional	Charlottesville toward Boston South or Springfield
Location

Kemper Street station, also known as Lynchburg station, is an intermodal transit station in Lynchburg, Virginia, United States. It serves Amtrak while an adjacent bus transfer center serves Greater Lynchburg Transit Company and Greyhound buses. Kemper Street Station is located at 825 Kemper Street.

== History ==
Kemper Street station was built in 1912 by the Southern Railway to house their passenger and freight operations in the Lynchburg area. A three-story structure built into a hillside, the top floor fronts Kemper Street while on the opposite side the track level ground floor fronts the rail platforms. Originally included but later removed was an elevated walkway extending from a street level passenger lobby across the tracks. Stairs descended from the walkway to the platforms, two stories below. A freight depot was located in the ground floor. As it was not the city's only railway facility, the "Kemper Street" name was used to clearly identify it among Lynchburg's other train stations. Over many decades to follow, the station was a stop for Southern Railway passenger trains (the Birmingham Special, Pelican, and Tennessean toward southwestern Virginia and Augusta Special, Crescent, Peach Queen, Piedmont Limited and Southerner toward the western part of the Carolinas). When Southern Railway discontinued passenger services in 1979, the operation of their passenger routes and stations, including Kemper Street station, was relinquished to Amtrak.

=== Restoration ===
After years of continued use and neglect, the signs of disrepair at the station were becoming increasingly apparent. The Lynchburg City Council determined that renovations would be necessary to save the city-owned facility and ensure its future use. They spearheaded a redevelopment project budgeted at over $3 million, funding for which was provided by the city, commonwealth, and federal government sources including Amtrak. Extensive work began in 2000 to update the facility, but with an emphasis on maintaining period lighting and finishes, and preserving the station's historic character.

In April 2002, the city of Lynchburg celebrated the opening of the newly restored Kemper Street station. The restoration allowed the facility to take on the new role of intermodal station, housing both rail and bus services. Amtrak operations were moved to the ground-floor platform level, left vacant since the station no longer serviced freight trains. This allowed for Greyhound Lines to establish a bus terminal in the vacated street-level passenger facility, thus centralizing Lynchburg's primary services for intercity passenger travel under one roof.

The restored station features brick construction with arched windows and accents of painted metal. An arched sign over Kemper Street near Park Avenue reads "Kemper Street Station". Of note are the numerous lights which illuminate the station's exterior. These are of particular importance to the station since most of the trains serving Lynchburg are scheduled either late in the evening or in the early morning, often before sunrise.

== Services ==
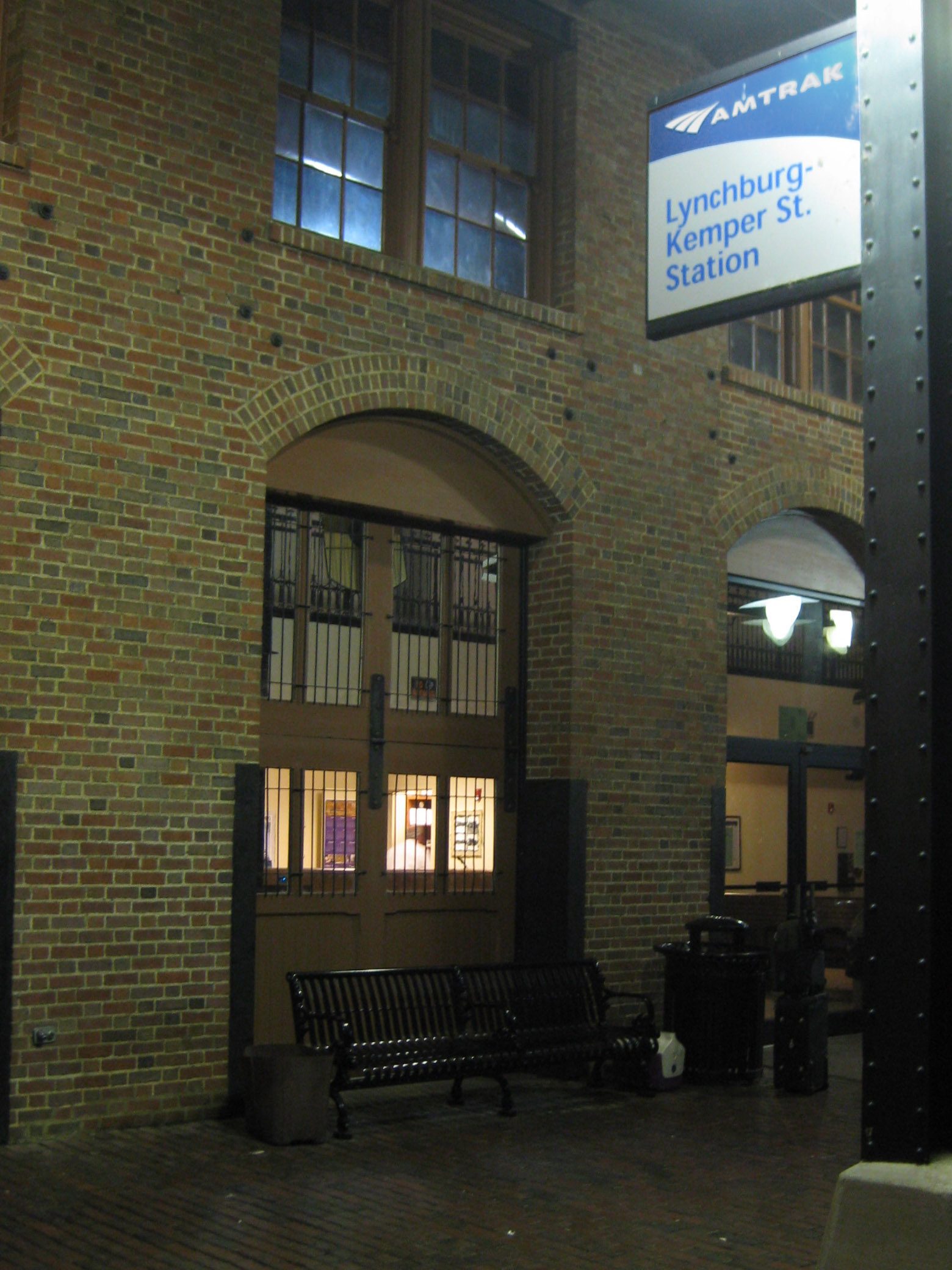
Ground floor Amtrak Station entry

=== Rail ===
The year 2012 marked the 100 year anniversary of passenger train service at Lynchburg-Kemper Street station. Today, as the only passenger train station still operating in Lynchburg, it is serviced by four Amtrak trains daily. The rail line upon which the station is situated belongs to Southern Railway's corporate descendant, Norfolk Southern Railway, which owns both the track and the adjacent platforms.

The Crescent is a long-distance, overnight service operating daily between New York City and New Orleans, LA. The Crescent stops at Lynchburg-Kemper Street station on its northbound and southbound runs. The northbound train arrives just before the morning rush, and the southbound train arrives in the middle of the night. This train had previously serviced Lynchburg during the old Southern Railway days, and was known as the Southern Crescent for most of the 1970s. For the better part of three decades, the Crescent was the only passenger train serving Lynchburg.

October, 2009 saw the introduction of Northeast Regional daily round-trip service between Lynchburg and Boston, MA's South Station. The route to Lynchburg was extended from its previous southern terminus in Washington, DC. This extension is operated through a partnership between Amtrak and the Virginia Department of Rail and Public Transportation, under the guise of Amtrak Virginia. It provided daylight service to Lynchburg for the first time in three decades.

In June, 2016, Amtrak announced plans to add an additional daily round-trip service as part of the Northeast Regional. The Northeast Regional was extended to Roanoke on October 31, 2017 and on July 11, 2022 a second daily round-trip, an afternoon departure of Amtrak's overnight train of the Northeast Corridor, numbers 66/67, the former Night Owl, was added to the Northeast Regional bringing a total of six trains per day to Lynchburg.

Amtrak's station code for Lynchburg is LYH. The station features restrooms, an enclosed waiting area, and a ticket office staffed by Amtrak personnel. Services from this location include checked baggage assistance and a Quik-Trak ticketing kiosk.

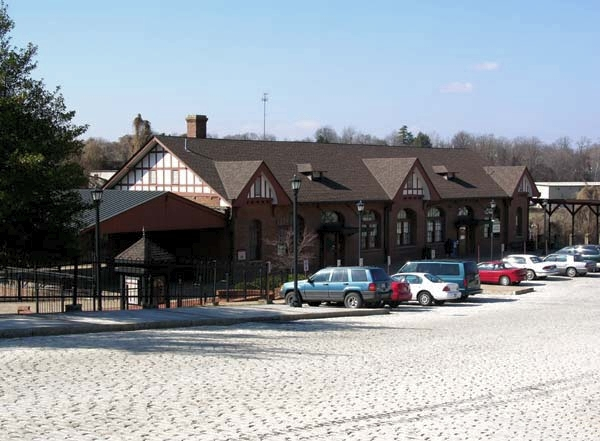
Greyhound Terminal along Kemper Street

=== Bus ===
Virginia Breeze, a bus brand operated by Megabus on behalf of the Virginia Department of Rail and Public Transportation, provides bus service from the street level bus terminal along Kemper Street. The bus terminal is two stories above the train terminal which is at the bottom of the hillside. The Piedmont Express, by Virginia Breeze, provides service from Danville to Washington DC with a stop in Lynchburg.

Beginning in 2002, Greyhound Lines supplied intercity bus service along with their "Greyhound PackageXpress" shipping service from the Kemper Street terminal. However, as of June, 2022, Greyhound buses simply stop at Greater Lynchburg Transit Company bus transfer center adjacent to the Kemper Street station and Greyhound PackageXpress is no longer offered in Lynchburg.

Connections for local buses operated by the Greater Lynchburg Transit Company (GLTC) are available at the bus transfer center adjacent to the station, completed in 2014.
