= RNK =

RNK may refer to:

- Ram Nath Kovind, (born 1945), former president of India
- Roanoke station (Virginia)
- RNK Split, Croatian football club
