= LYH =

LYH may refer to:

- LYH, the Amtrak station code for Kemper Street station, Virginia, United States
- LYH, the IATA and FAA LID code for Lynchburg Regional Airport, Virginia, United States
