= Roanoke station =

Train station in Virginia

Roanoke, VA
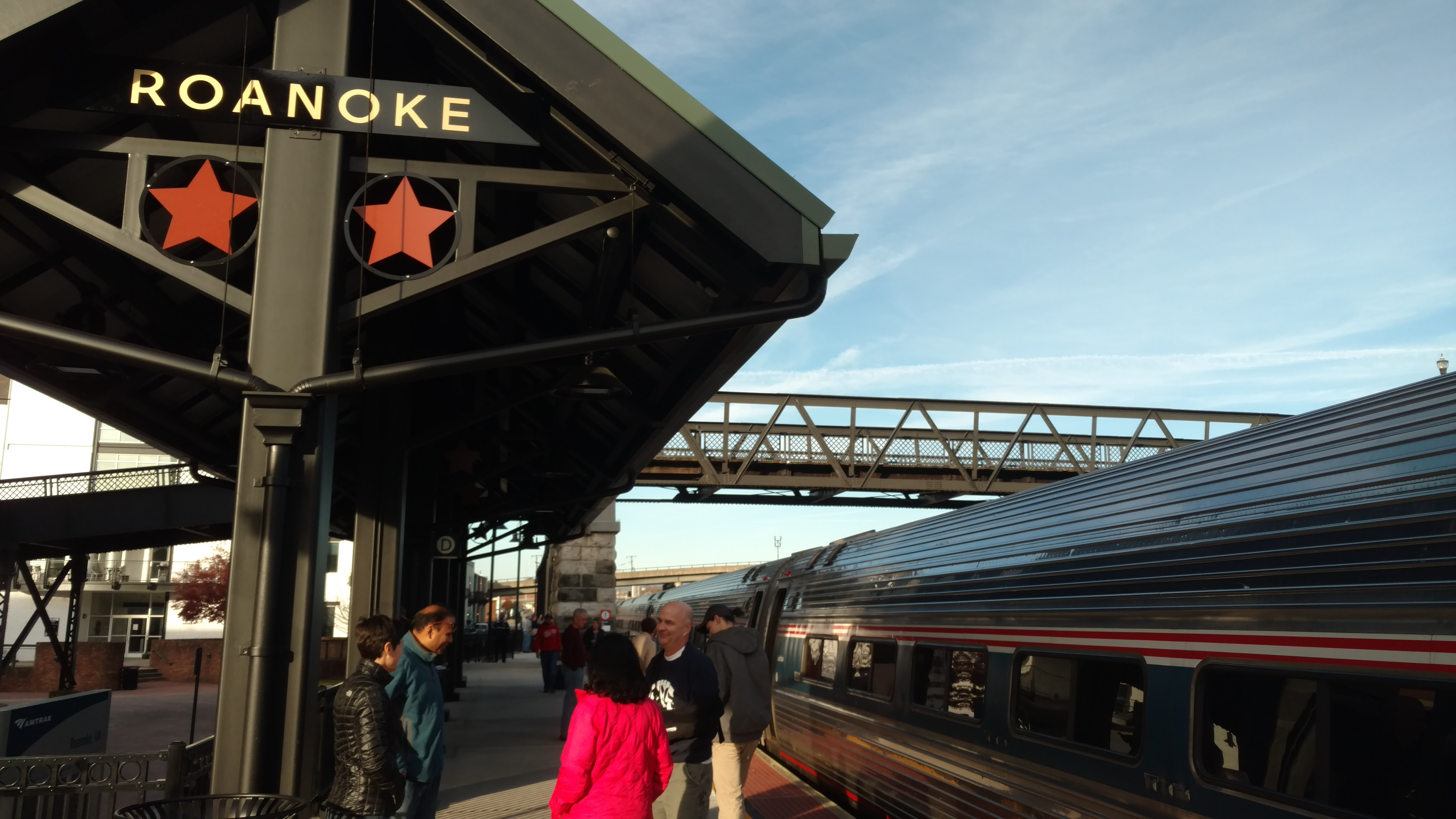
- Roanoke station platform, November 2017

General information
- Location: 55 Norfolk Avenue SW; Roanoke, Virginia; United States
- Coordinates: 37°16′23.77″N 79°56′32.45″W
- Line: NS Christiansburg District
- Platforms: 1 side platform
- Tracks: 3
- Connections: Greyhound Lines; SmartWay Bus; Valley Metro

Construction
- Accessible: Yes

Other information
- Station code: Amtrak: RNK

History
- Opened: 1857; March 24, 1975; October 31, 2017
- Closed: April 30, 1971; October 1, 1979
- Rebuilt: 1905, 1949

Passengers
- FY 2025: 105,926 (Amtrak)

Services
Preceding station	Amtrak	Following station
Terminus	Northeast Regional	Lynchburg toward Boston South or Springfield
Former services
Preceding station	Amtrak	Following station
Christiansburg toward Tri-State	Hilltopper	Bedford toward Boston South
Christiansburg toward Chicago	Mountaineer	Bedford toward Norfolk
Preceding station	Norfolk and Western Railway	Following station
Christiansburg toward Cincinnati	Main Line	Vinton toward Norfolk
Walton toward Bristol	Bristol – Roanoke	Terminus
Boones Mill toward Winston-Salem	Winston-Salem – Roanoke	Terminus
Terminus	Hagerstown – Roanoke	Hollins toward Hagerstown
Future services
Preceding station	Amtrak	Following station
Christiansburg Terminus	Northeast Regional	Bedford toward Boston South or Springfield
Location

Roanoke station is a train station in Roanoke, Virginia, the current southwestern terminus of Amtrak's Northeast Regional line. Built in 2017, it follows several other Roanoke passenger stations that operated from the 1850s to 1979. The unstaffed station consists of a single high-level platform with space for 10 cars. There is no station building or waiting room available for passengers. All tickets must be purchased in advance; there is no Quik-Trak kiosk at the station.

== History ==
=== Early history ===
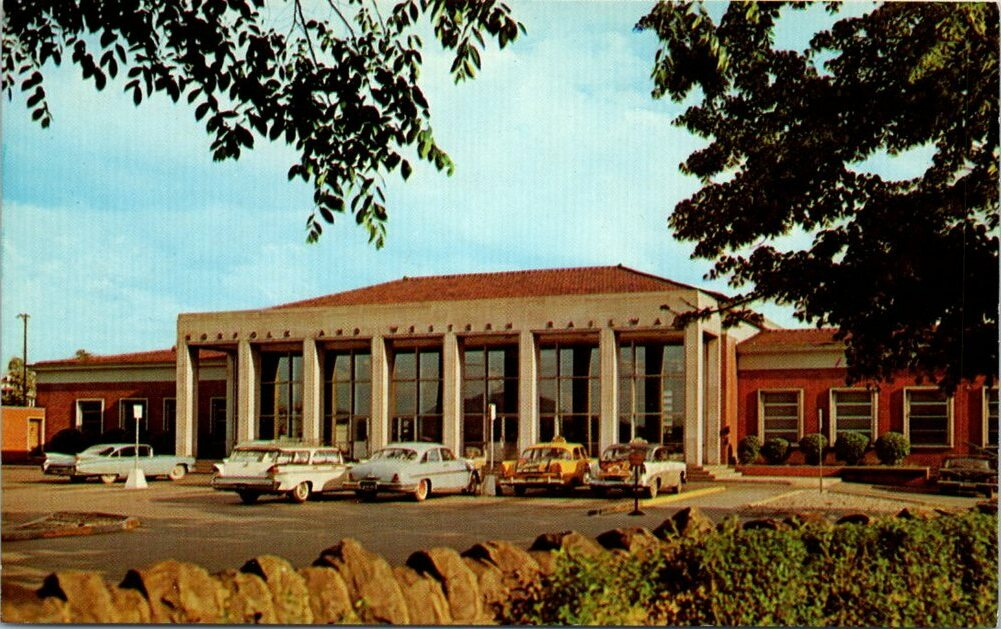
The N&W passenger station, ca. 1950s, redesigned in a Moderne style

By the time of its 1852 incorporation, the town of Big Lick was already established as a transportation hub for western Virginia, thanks to its position on the Great Wagon Road and the Wilderness Trail. The Virginia and Tennessee Railroad was completed from Lynchburg to Big Lick that same year, and on to Bristol in 1856. The Virginia and Tennessee became part of the Atlantic, Mississippi and Ohio Railroad in 1870, which itself emerged from bankruptcy and was renamed as the Norfolk and Western Railway (N&W) in 1882.

The Shenandoah Valley Railroad was completed to the town (newly renamed Roanoke) from Hagerstown, Maryland, in 1882, and acquired by the N&W in 1890. Its unbuilt southern section was eventually completed as the Roanoke and Southern Railroad (the "Punkin Vine") in 1892 and immediately leased to the N&W.

In 1905, the N&W constructed a station to replace the half-century-old depot.

The Virginian Railway was completed in 1909; a competitor to the N&W, it ran along a separate route along the Roanoke River. The Virginian's Roanoke station, located 1 mile (1.6 km) south of the N&W station, served until the end of passenger service in 1956.

=== End of service ===
The last train from Roanoke south (#11, and #12 northbound) to Winston-Salem on the "Punkin Vine" was on February 18, 1961. The "Punkin Vine" service was timed to connect with Powhatan Arrow trains to and from Norfolk. Through sleepers were then still operated on the N&W's #1/#2 Shenandoah Valley train between Roanoke and New York (via Hagerstown and Harrisburg) on the Pennsylvania Railroad (PRR) and the N&W. The PRR discontinued service between Harrisburg and Hagerstown on February 25, 1962, and the N&W between Hagerstown and Waynesboro on June 10; the sleepers were rerouted via the Chesapeake and Ohio Railway. The last sleeper between Roanoke and Waynesboro ran on October 27, 1962, although local service continued until February 1963.

This left Roanoke with only east-west passenger service for the first time since 1882. The N&W continued to run trains, including the express Norfolk-Cincinnati Pocahontas and the local train on the same route, the Powhatan Arrow. The N&W also operated the north-south Birmingham-Washington Birmingham Special (unnamed after February 1970 and cut back to Bristol in August 1970) and the Pelican (discontinued, 1970) until April 30, 1971. The N&W operated the last east-west train, the Pocahantas, up to the same date. When Amtrak took over most intercity passenger service on May 1, none of the last three trains were included in its basic system, and Roanoke ceased to have passenger rail service.

=== 1970s Amtrak service ===
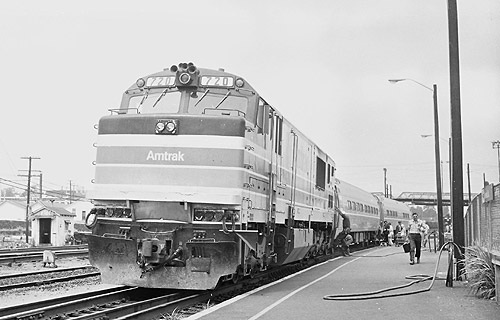
The Mountaineer at Roanoke in May 1977

Service was restored on March 24, 1975, with the introduction of the Mountaineer service between Norfolk and Chicago. Unlike most stations on the route, Amtrak did not reuse the former N&W station. Instead, an asphalt platform was built off Shenandoah Avenue near 4th Street, 0.5 miles (0.80 km) to the west.

The Mountaineer was replaced by the Hilltopper on June 1, 1977. The Hilltopper was discontinued on October 1, 1979, ending rail service to Roanoke for the second time. For the next four decades, Roanoke's only link to the national railroad system was an Amtrak Thruway route that connected Roanoke to Lynchburg via the Crescent and later a Northeast Regional frequency.

=== Current service ===
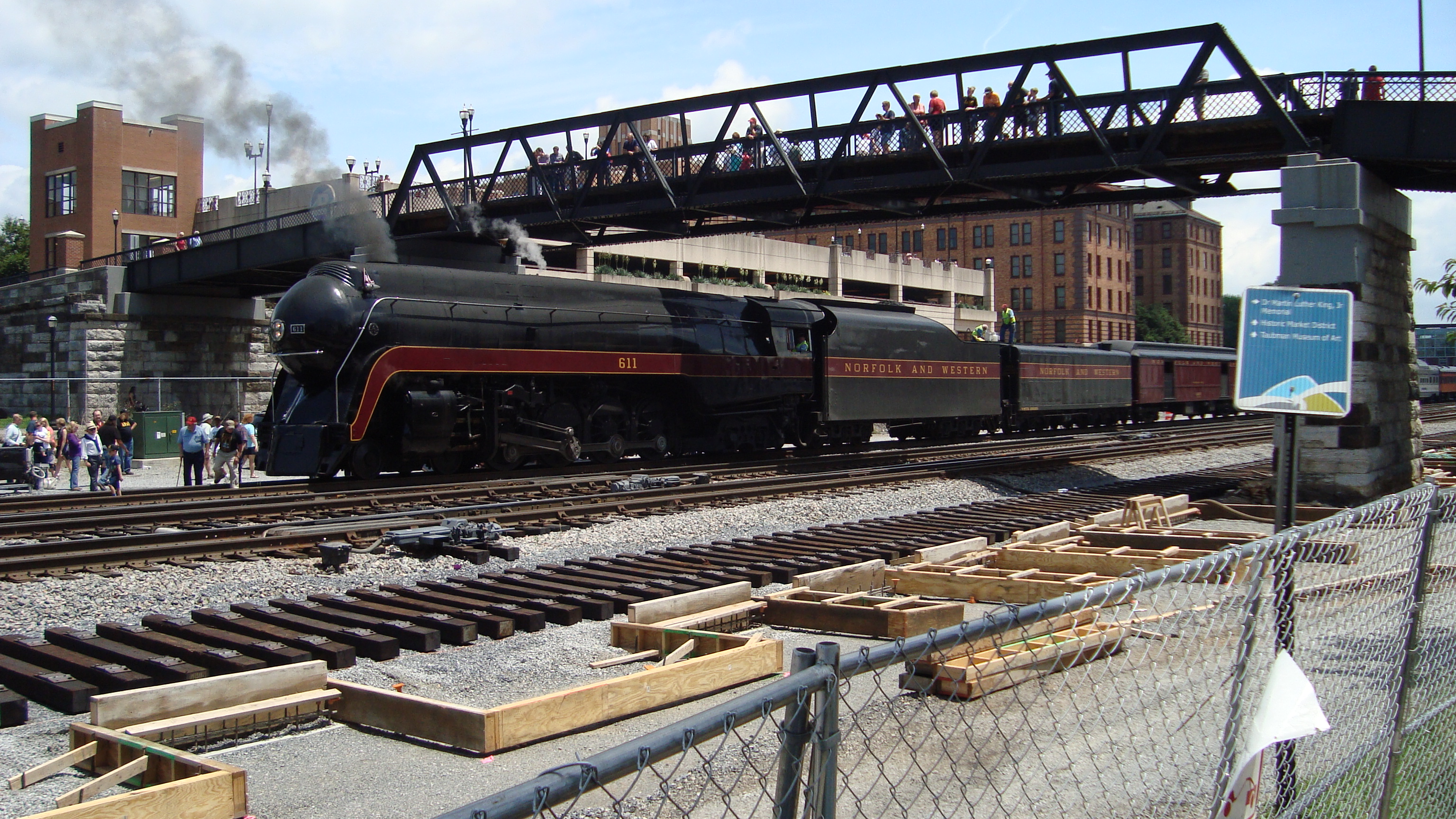
An excursion train run by N&W 611 passes the under-construction platform in May 2017

From 1996 to 2007, six studies examined the proposed Transdominion Express project, which would have created two intercity rail routes from Bristol to Richmond and Washington, both via Roanoke. The last of these predicted poor ridership and low farebox recovery, and the state government abandoned the idea. But the research also suggested that Amtrak should increase service along Virginia's busiest corridors. One daily Northeast Regional round trip was extended to Lynchburg in October 2009, supplementing the Crescent service.

In 2008, Virginia's transportation regulator, the Commonwealth Transportation Board, outlined plans for expanded rail service in the state, including to Roanoke. Following the introduction of state-supported Northeast Regional trains to Lynchburg and Norfolk, the state reached an agreement with the Norfolk Southern Railway in January 2014 to spend about $93 million on infrastructure improvements that would allow passenger service to reach Roanoke. With the former N&W station having been repurposed as the O. Winston Link Museum, a new station had to be built.

Railroad construction was slated for 2015, improvements to the station and other facilities in Roanoke in 2016, and service would begin in 2017 with a single round trip departing Roanoke for Washington, D.C., in the morning and returning in the evening. Construction of the Roanoke facilities was delayed; a $4.9 million train storage facility was completed in early February 2017, and work on the $10.9 million station began later in the month, with completion scheduled for the end of the year. State officials had planned to construct a low platform, requiring passengers with disabilities to use wheelchair lifts. However, the Federal Railroad Administration cited federal law requiring a high level platform and combined with Amtrak’s requirements, resulted in Virginia’s first level platform running 850 feet long. On October 31, 2017, after nearly 40 years, passenger service returned to Roanoke.

On July 11, 2022, a second Roanoke round trip was added: southbound in the morning and northbound in the afternoon, to complement the existing trip. Both round trips will be extended from Roanoke to Christiansburg by 2027. As of 2026, the city plans to build a station building adjacent to the platform.

== See also ==
- Norfolk and Western Railway Company Historic District
