= Southwestern Limited (IC train) =

Illinois Central Railroad train (1934-1967)

Overview
- Service type: Inter-city rail
- Status: Discontinued
- Locale: Southeastern United States
- First service: 1934
- Last service: 1967
- Former operators: Southern Railway for sleeper passengers Illinois Central

Route
- Termini: Meridian, Mississippi; New York, New York for sleeper operations Shreveport, Louisiana
- Service frequency: Daily
- Train numbers: 205: southwest-bound; 206: northeast-bound

On-board services
- Seating arrangements: Reclining seat coaches
- Sleeping arrangements: Sections, compartments and drawing rooms
- Catering facilities: Cafe lounge (Jackson, Mississippi to Sibley, Louisiana)

Technical
- Track gauge: 1,435 mm (4 ft 8 1/2 in)

The Southwestern Limited was a night train, as #205 of the Illinois Central Railroad in the Southeastern United States. Running on the IC subsidiary Yazoo and Mississippi Valley Railroad Vicksburg Division, from Meridian, Mississippi's Union Station to Shreveport, Louisiana's own Union Station, it was one of the few trains spanning the Mississippi River south of St. Louis, Missouri and north of New Orleans, Louisiana.

For much of its history from 1934 to 1967 it was linked with the Southern Railway's Pelican. Thus, the train carried sleeper cars that originated in New York City to Shreveport via Knoxville, Tennessee and Chattanooga, Tennessee. Coach riding passengers apparently needed to take Pennsylvania Railroad coaches from New York City to Washington, and Southern Railway coaches from Washington, D.C. to Meridian. Its opposite, #206, northeast bound, from Shreveport to Meridian, was carried by the Illinois Central's Northeastern Limited.

It also had section which connected at Meridian, continued east to Birmingham, Alabama, whereupon it linked with the Southern Railway's Peach Queen (#29/#30) and continued to Atlanta, Georgia. Coaches were provided continuous, Shreveport to Atlanta.

The train's schedule, 2:40 am from Meridian to 2:20 pm arrival in Shreveport, was more for the convenience of long distance riders from areas northeast of Meridian. However, by 1961 the IC no longer arranged to have Pullman sleepers carry passengers continuous from the Upper South and the Northeast down to Mississippi and Louisiana. In the train's last years it took different numbers, #201 southwest-bound, and #202 for the Northeastern Limited.
