= Bristol station (Virginia) =

Historic train station in Bristol, Virginia

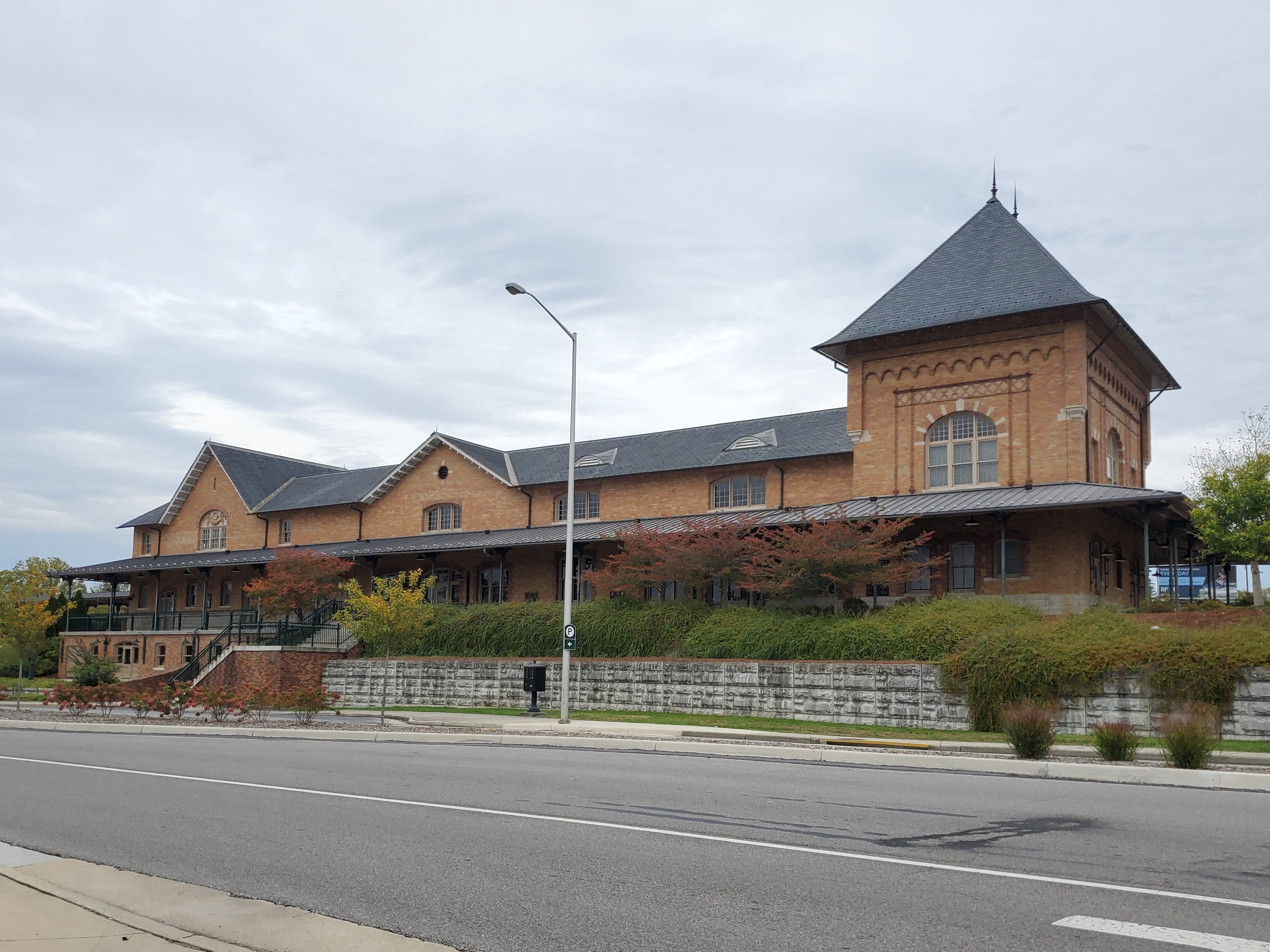
- Bristol station from the west in 2020

General information
- Location: 101 M.L.K. Jr Boulevard, Bristol, Virginia

History
- Opened: 1865
- Closed: May 1, 1971
- Rebuilt: 1902

Former services
Preceding station	Norfolk and Western Railway	Following station
Terminus	Bristol – Roanoke	Abingdon toward Roanoke
Preceding station	Southern Railway	Following station
Bluff City toward Memphis	Memphis – Bristol	Terminus
Haskell toward St. Charles	Appalachia Division	Terminus
- Bristol Railroad Station
- U.S. National Register of Historic Places
- Virginia Landmarks Register
- Coordinates: 36°35′44″N 82°10′47″W
- Area: 4.5 acres (1.8 ha)
- Built: 1891, 1902
- NRHP reference No.: 80004173
- VLR No.: 102-0011

Significant dates
- Added to NRHP: November 28, 1980
- Designated VLR: September 16, 1980
Location

Bristol station (locally known as Union Station and Bristol Train Station) is a historic railroad station in Bristol, Virginia, USA, just north of the Tennessee state line. Built in 1902, the station was served by passenger trains until 1971. It was listed on the National Register of Historic Places as Bristol Railroad Station in 1980.

== History ==
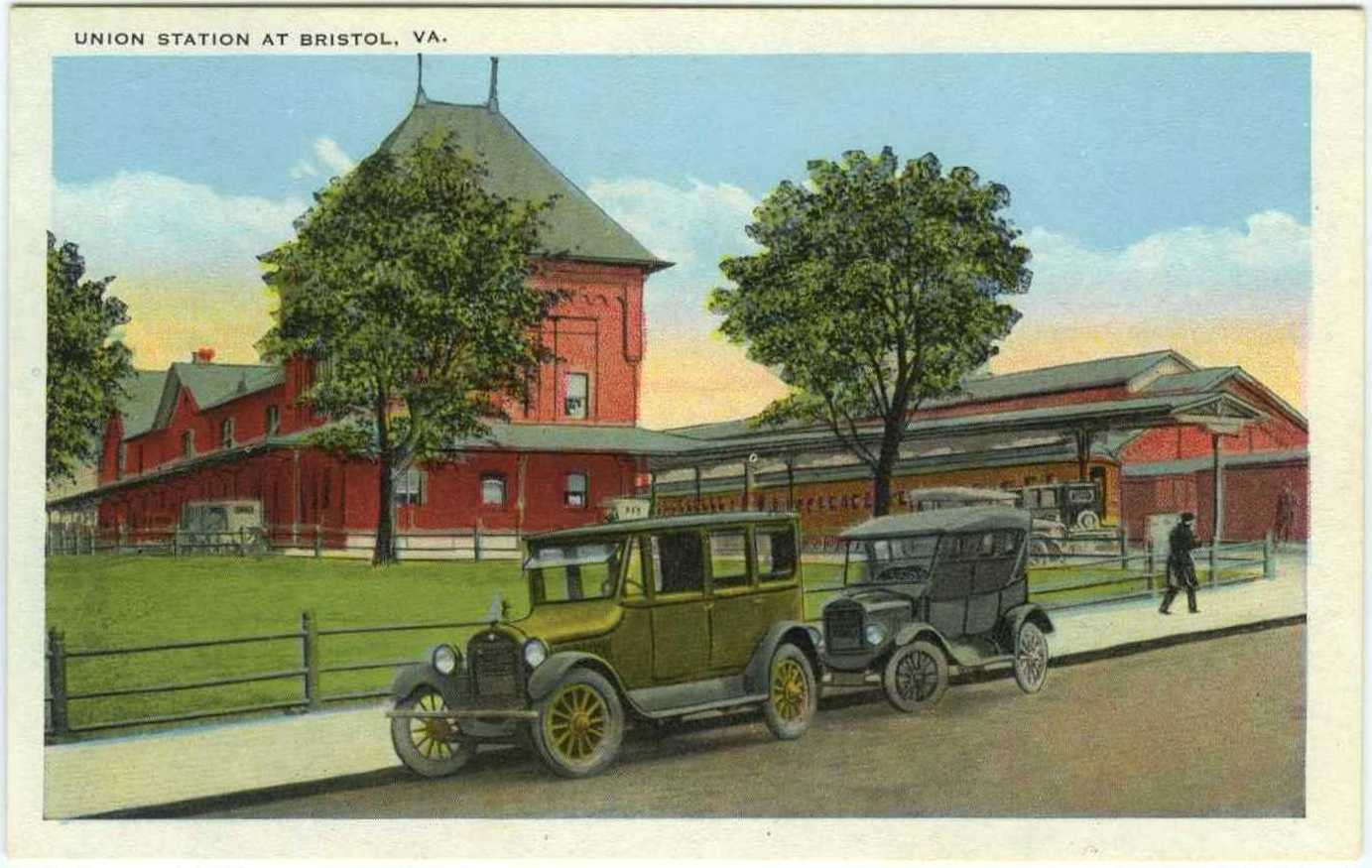
Postcard of Bristol station, c. 1915–1930

Rail service first reached Bristol from Knoxville in 1856 via the East Tennessee and Virginia Railroad, a predecessor of the Southern Railway, and from Lynchburg via the Virginia and Tennessee Railroad, a predecessor of the Norfolk and Western Railway. The current station was built in 1902 by the Norfolk and Western at a cost of $79,000 (equivalent to $2,940,000 in 2025). It is a one- to two-story brick building consisting of a tower section; a long seven-bay, one-story midsection; and a six-bay, two-story east end. The tower has a hipped roof with deep overhanging eaves supported by long sawn brackets. Stylistically, the station fits into the pattern of early 20th-century American eclecticism, combining Romanesque with various European vernacular modes. Associated with the station is a brick freight house constructed in 1883 and expanded in 1891.

=== Named trains and end of service ===
Passenger service to Bristol station ended with the discontinuance of the N&W's and Southern Railway's Birmingham Special on April 30, 1971, when Amtrak assumed control for intercity passenger service in the United States. The station was listed on the National Register of Historic Places in 1980 as the Bristol Railroad Station. Around 2017, with Amtrak extending one daily Northeast Regional round trip to Roanoke, Bristol officials began advocating for a further extension to Bristol.
