= Hilltopper (train) =

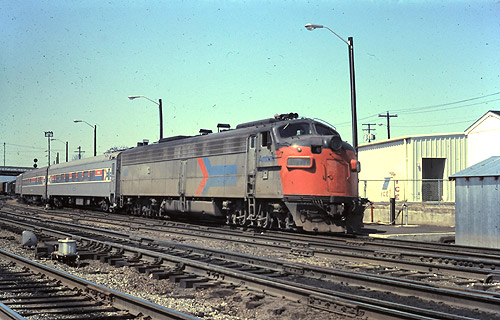
- The Hilltopper at Roanoke, Virginia in April 1978

Overview
- Service type: Inter-city rail
- Status: Discontinued
- Locale: Eastern United States
- Predecessor: Mountaineer
- First service: June 1, 1977
- Last service: September 30, 1979
- Former operator: Amtrak

Route
- Termini: Boston, Massachusetts; Catlettsburg, Kentucky
- Stops: 34
- Distance travelled: 1,674 miles (2,694 km)
- Average journey time: 26 hours 35 minutes
- Service frequency: Daily
- Train numbers: 34, 35 (until January 8, 1978); 66, 67

On-board services
- Classes: Sleeping car service (Boston-Washington); Reserved and unreserved coach
- Catering facilities: On-board cafe

Technical
- Rolling stock: Amfleet coaches
- Track gauge: 4 ft 8 1/2 in (1,435 mm)
- Track owners: Amtrak, RF&P, N&W

The Hilltopper was a passenger train operated by Amtrak in the Mid-Atlantic region of the United States. It ran daily from South Station in Boston, Massachusetts to Catlettsburg station in Catlettsburg, Kentucky. The 1,674 mi (2,694 km) run made 34 stops in 11 states and the District of Columbia.

== History ==
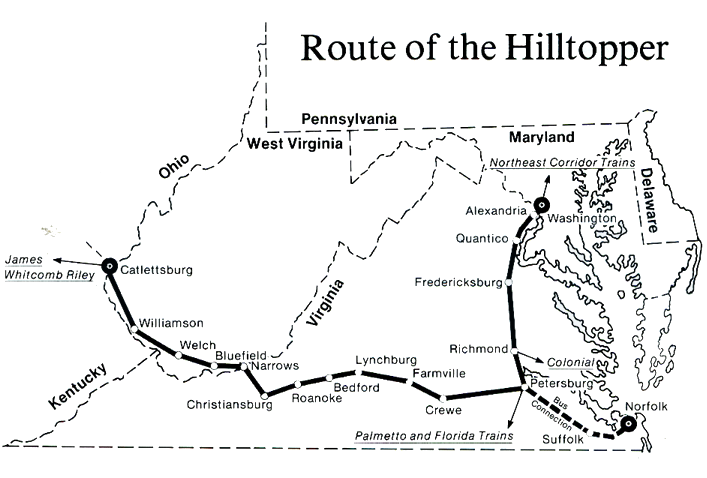
1977 map of the Hilltopper route

The Chicago-Norfolk Mountaineer, introduced in 1975, suffered from low ridership and high costs. Despite its failings, West Virginia senator Robert Byrd demanded that Amtrak replace it with another train on the Norfolk and Western Railway (N&W) to serve his rural constituents - and that the new train would use new Amfleet equipment and serve Washington, D.C. The Washington-Catlettsburg Hilltopper replaced the Mountaineer on June 1, 1977. The Hilltopper retained all Mountaineer stops between Catlettsburg and Petersburg, Virginia, while the James Whitcomb Riley (which had run combined with the Mountaineer west of Catlettsburg) continued to provide a Chicago connection. Only Norfolk and Suffolk, Virginia lost train service; a bus connection to Petersburg was provided.

The Hilltopper had warm supporters in Byrd and West Virginian congressman Harley Staggers but it was "cited by critics as an example of everything that was wrong with Amtrak". Beginning on January 8, 1978, the Hilltopper was combined with the Night Owl, creating through service from Boston to Catlettsburg, Kentucky. Even with this effort to improve its farebox recovery ratio, the train averaged 33 passengers per trip in 1978, dropping to between 2 and 15 per trip in 1979. Its average speed of 37.1 miles per hour (59.7 km/h) was the lowest on the long-distance system. Farebox recovery was a dismal 25%, with the train losing $200,000 per year.

The Hilltopper was one of five routes cut on October 1, 1979, as part of a reorganization by the Carter Administration, and the only of the five where no federal injunctions were obtained to keep service running. Many of the train's riders were former N&W employees with lifetime passes. The Night Owl continued to be run after the cut.

The end of the Hilltopper spelled the end of intercity rail service along much of its route in Southwest Virginia and West Virginia. However, one daily Northeast Regional round trip was extended from Lynchburg to Roanoke on October 31, 2017.

== Proposed restored service ==
As recently as October 2019, passenger rail advocates are pushing for restoration of east-west service from Christiansburg and the Blue Ridge Mountains to the Hampton Roads area, via Roanoke, Lynchburg, Charlottesville, and Richmond with a "Commonwealth Corridor." This would be the first cross-Virginia passenger train since the Hilltopper.

A 2021 feasibility study for the corridor conducted by the Virginia Department of Rail and Public Transportation estimated that the service would cost $416.5 million to get started, and generate 177,200 annual riders by 2040.

In December 2023, the Federal Railroad Administration accepted an application by VDRPT to enter the Commonwealth Corridor route into its Corridor Identification and Development Program. The program grants $500,000 toward service planning and prioritizes the route for future federal funding.
