= Charlottesville Union Station =

Railway station in Virginia, United States

Charlottesville, VA
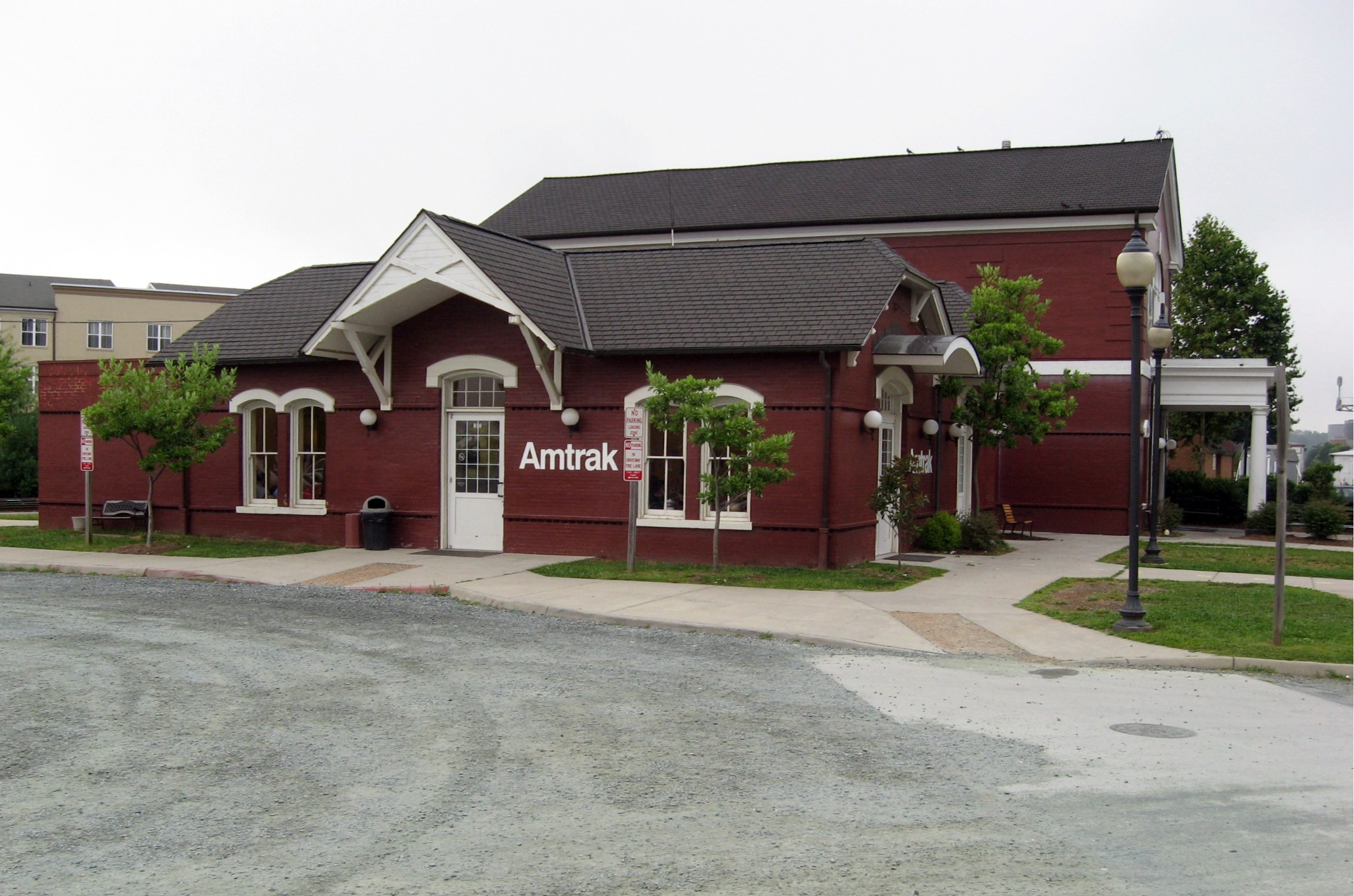
- Charlottesville station in July 2009

General information
- Location: 810 West Main Street; Charlottesville, Virginia; United States
- Coordinates: 38°01′53″N 78°29′31″W
- Owner: Union Station Partners LLC
- Lines: BB Washington Subdivision; CSX Washington Subdivision; NS Washington District
- Platforms: 2 side platforms (1 on each line)
- Tracks: 4 (2 on each line)

Construction
- Parking: 10 short-term and 165 long-term spaces
- Accessible: yes

Other information
- Station code: Amtrak: CVS

History
- Opened: 1885
- Rebuilt: 1915, mid–1990s

Passengers
- FY 2025: 199,357 (Amtrak)

Services
Preceding station	Amtrak	Following station
Staunton toward Chicago	Cardinal	Culpeper toward New York
Lynchburg toward New Orleans	Crescent	Culpeper toward New York
Lynchburg toward Roanoke	Northeast Regional	Culpeper toward Boston South or Springfield
Former services
Preceding station	Southern Railway	Following station
Hickory Hill toward Birmingham	Main Line	Rio toward Washington, D.C.
Preceding station	Amtrak	Following station
Staunton toward Chicago	James Whitcomb Riley	Charlottesville (Main St. Sta.) toward Richmond (Ellerson Sta.)
Route map
Location

The Charlottesville Union Station, located in Charlottesville, Virginia, United States, is served by Amtrak's Cardinal, Crescent, and daily Northeast Regional passenger trains. It is Amtrak's fourth-busiest station in Virginia, aside from its all-auto Auto Train station in Lorton. The station is situated in the northeast quadrant of the junction between two railway lines. The Cardinal uses the east–west line, owned by the state of Virginia, and formerly by CSX Transportation, and operated by the Buckingham Branch Railroad, while other services use the north–south line owned and operated by Norfolk Southern Railway. The station is within walking distance of the University of Virginia, which is the major employer in the area.

== History ==
The original Union Station was built in 1885 to jointly serve the Charlottesville and Rapidan Railroad, the Virginia Midland Railway, and the Chesapeake and Ohio Railway. Major renovations in 1915 included the construction of a baggage handling facility.

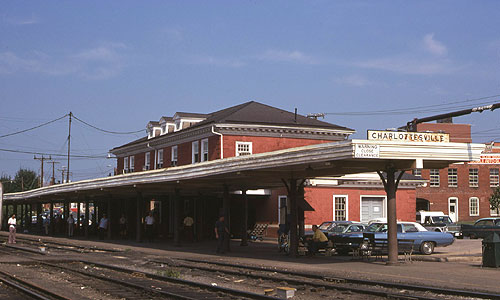
Main Street Station in August 1974

When Amtrak took over most intercity passenger rail service in 1971, the Southern Railway opted to continue running the Southern Crescent itself, at Union Station. The James Whitcomb Riley (later the Cardinal) used Main Street Station to the east, as well as stopping at Union Station until early in 1977. The last train between Charlottesville and Richmond ran on June 14, 1976, when the Amtrak changed the route of the James Whitcomb Riley. Afflicted with rising costs, the Southern Railway relented and turned the Southern Crescent over to Amtrak on February 1, 1979. Amtrak renamed it as the Crescent and made Union Station the Charlottesville stop for the Cardinal as well.

For most of the next three decades, the only trains calling at Charlottesville were the Crescent, which arrived northbound during the morning rush and southbound in the evening, and the thrice weekly Cardinal, which arrived westbound at lunchtime and eastbound before the afternoon rush. In 2009, Amtrak extended a Northeast Regional round-trip to Lynchburg (since extended to Roanoke) by way of Charlottesville. On July 11, 2022, Amtrak added a second daily round-trip, an afternoon departure of Amtrak's overnight train of the Northeast Corridor, numbers 66/67, the former Night Owl, was added to the Northeast Regional.

Since 1999, the former baggage handling facility is home to the Amtrak ticket office and waiting area. The main facility was privately developed into the commercial restaurant, Wild Wing Cafe, which has now closed. Plans coincident with the redevelopment to create a transportation hub at Union Station were not realized. Instead, in 2007 Charlottesville completed the Downtown Transit Center one mile across town.

However, the station does serve as an intermodal transportation nexus, with connecting Amtrak Thruway motorcoach service to Richmond Staples Mill Road station for some trains there, a 200-plus-space parking lot, and a Greyhound Lines bus stop. The Virginia Breeze, a bus service sponsored by the Virginia Department of Rail and Public Transportation, stops a few miles to the west at a shopping center. These services allow Charlottesville travelers to reach various airports and other destinations in the region. The Charlottesville Free Trolley stops just north of the station, and connects Downtown and the University of Virginia.

Out of the twenty-one Virginia stations, Charlottesville is the fifth busiest, according to the FY2025 ridership. This is mainly due to the large number of passengers traveling between this station and Washington, Baltimore and points north.

=== Future ===
In December 2019 the Commonwealth of Virginia purchased CSX Transportation's Buckingham Branch track and right-of-way from Clifton Forge, Virginia to Charlottesville, and onward to Doswell, Virginia, north of Richmond. The western segment hosts the Cardinal, while the eastern segment facilitates future passenger service between Charlottesville and Richmond, as outlined in the 2017 Virginia Statewide Rail Plan. It covers the same route used by the James Whitcomb Riley in 1976. The state is leasing the line to CSX and Buckingham Branch for its current uses.
