= Hampton Roads Chamber of Commerce =

The Hampton Roads Chamber of Commerce (also known as Hampton Roads Chamber) is a business network comprising 2,500 businesses throughout the Hampton Roads region. The mission of the chamber of commerce is to "set the optimal conditions for business success" through public policy and economic development. The chamber has five divisions: Chesapeake, Norfolk, Portsmouth, Suffolk and Virginia Beach.

== Virginia Beach division ==
New headquarters for the Virginia Beach division were built in 1974 under the leadership of Chamber of Commerce president Richard Kline, founder of RK Auto Group.

The Virginia Beach division was located at 222 Central Park Avenue, Suite 1010 in Virginia Beach, but has since been relocated to the Hampton Roads Chamber's headquarters in Downtown Norfolk.
