= Northeast Regional =

Amtrak northeastern U.S. intercity rail service

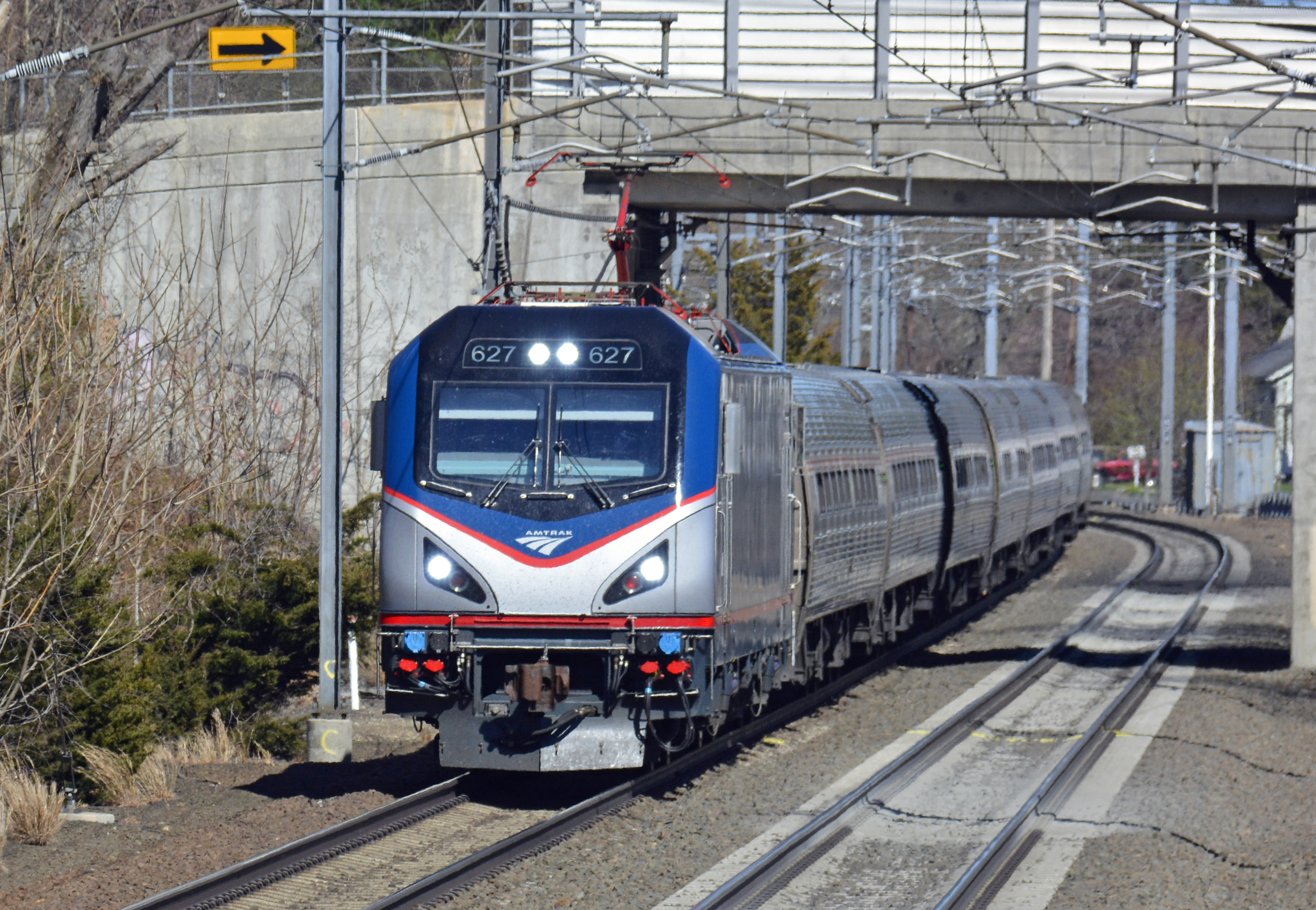
- Northeast Regional in Madison, Connecticut, in April 2015

Overview
- Service type: Inter-city rail, higher-speed rail
- Locale: Northeastern and Mid-Atlantic United States
- First service: 2008 (renamed from Regional)
- Current operator: Amtrak
- Annual ridership: 12,018,536 (FY 25) ▲11.3% (Note: Amtrak's Fiscal Year (FY) runs from October 1 of the prior year to September 30 of the named year.)

Route
- Termini: Boston, Springfield, MA, or New York City; Washington, D.C. or Newport News, Norfolk, Roanoke, or Richmond, Virginia
- Stops: 53 (including all branches)
- Distance travelled: 682 mi (1,098 km) (longest distance: Boston–Roanoke)
- Average journey time: 14 hours (greatest travel time: Boston–Roanoke)
- Service frequency: 50+ trains per day
- Train number: 65-198

On-board services
- Classes: Coach Class; Business Class
- Catering facilities: Café
- Baggage facilities: Overhead racks

Technical
- Rolling stock: Amfleet coaches; Siemens ACS-64 locomotives; GE Genesis locomotives
- Track gauge: 4 ft 8 1/2 in (1,435 mm) standard gauge
- Electrification: Overhead line: 25 kV AC at 60 Hz (Boston–New Haven); 12.5 kV AC at 60 Hz (New Haven–New York); 12 kV AC at 25 Hz (New York–Washington)
- Operating speed: 125 mph (201 km/h) (top)

The Northeast Regional is an intercity rail service operated by Amtrak in the Northeastern and Mid-Atlantic United States. In the past, it has been known as the NortheastDirect, Acela Regional, or Regional. It is Amtrak's busiest route, carrying 12,018,536 passengers in fiscal year (FY) 2025. The Northeast Regional service received more than $787.7 million in gross ticket revenue in FY 2023.

The Northeast Regional offers daily all-reserved service, usually at least every hour. Trains generally run along the Northeast Corridor between Boston in the north to Washington, D.C., in the south with multiple stops, including in New York City, Philadelphia, and Baltimore. Extensions and branches provide service to Newport News, Norfolk, and Roanoke, Virginia, and Springfield, Massachusetts, with intermediate stops.

Trains cover the busiest stretch between New York Penn Station and Washington Union Station in about three and a half hours. The New York–Philadelphia segment takes one and a half hours, while Philadelphia–Washington takes two hours. North of New York, trains take four hours to reach Boston and three and a half hours to reach Springfield. South of Washington, travel times are four and a half hours to Newport News and Norfolk, and five hours to Roanoke.

== History ==
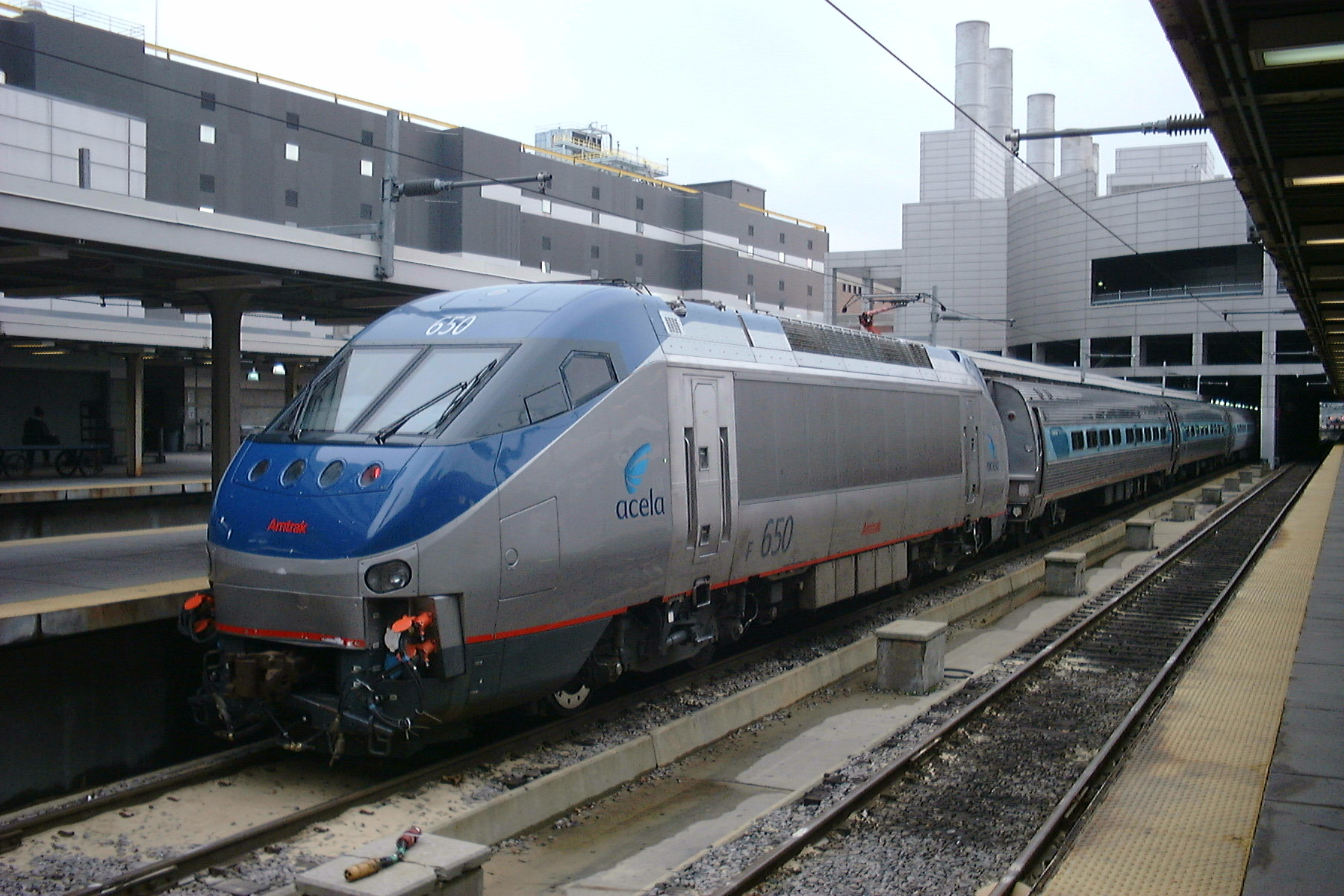
An HHP-8 locomotive and Amfleet I cars in Acela Regional branding at South Station in Boston, in March 2002

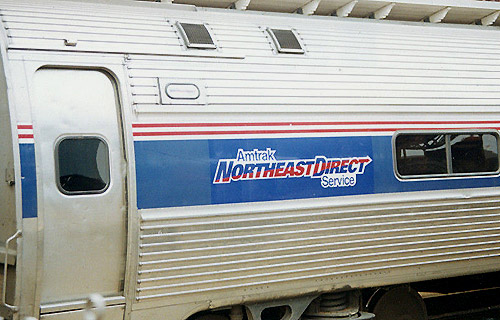
The NortheastDirect branding used for most Northeast Regional services between 1995 and 2003

The services along the line, as inherited from Penn Central, once had their own names, such as the "Yankee Clipper" and the "Federal"; typically a name applied to at most one train and its "twin" in the opposite direction. The line north of New Haven, Connecticut was not electrified and required an engine change. On October 28, 1995, Amtrak introduced the "NortheastDirect" brand for all trains on the Northeast Corridor (and its extension to Newport News, Virginia) except for the express Metroliner and hourly Clocker services. The November 10, 1996, timetable restored the old names in addition to the NortheastDirect brand. The names (except the Twilight Shoreliner) were dropped with the May 16, 1999, schedule.

In 2000, Amtrak completed electrifying the route from New Haven to Boston in preparation for the introduction of the Acela Express, thereby eliminating the engine change at New Haven for trains to and from Boston. The first two all-electric round-trips were branded Acela Regional and equipped with refurbished Amfleet cars painted in the Acela-like "Phase V" livery. All-electric service to and from Boston began on January 31, 2000. The NortheastDirect branding continued to be used for trains which changed from electric to diesel traction in New Haven.

Due to customer confusion with the Acela Express, the name was changed again on March 17, 2003, to simply "Regional." As part of rebranding and service improvements, the name was changed to "Northeast Regional" on June 23, 2008 (though it also appeared on schedules several months beforehand).

On May 12, 2015, Northeast Regional Train 188, traveling from Washington, D.C., to New York City, derailed at Frankford Junction near the Port Richmond neighborhood of Philadelphia, killing eight people and injuring more than 200 people. The train derailed along a curve and was determined to have been traveling at a speed of about 100 mph, exceeding the limit of 50 mph on that curve. This speed limit was not posted; engineers on that route are expected to rely on memory to control the speed of the train. Additionally, the train was suspected to have been hit by a projectile, as was a commuter train in the area shortly before the derailment.

Private sleeping rooms on overnight trains 65/66/67, last available in 2004 on the Federal, were made available effective April 5, 2021. The overnight trains were temporarily cancelled in January 2022; they resumed in July 2022 without sleepers. They were temporarily cancelled north of New York City effective April 4, 2023, due to Penn Station Access construction.

=== Virginia service ===
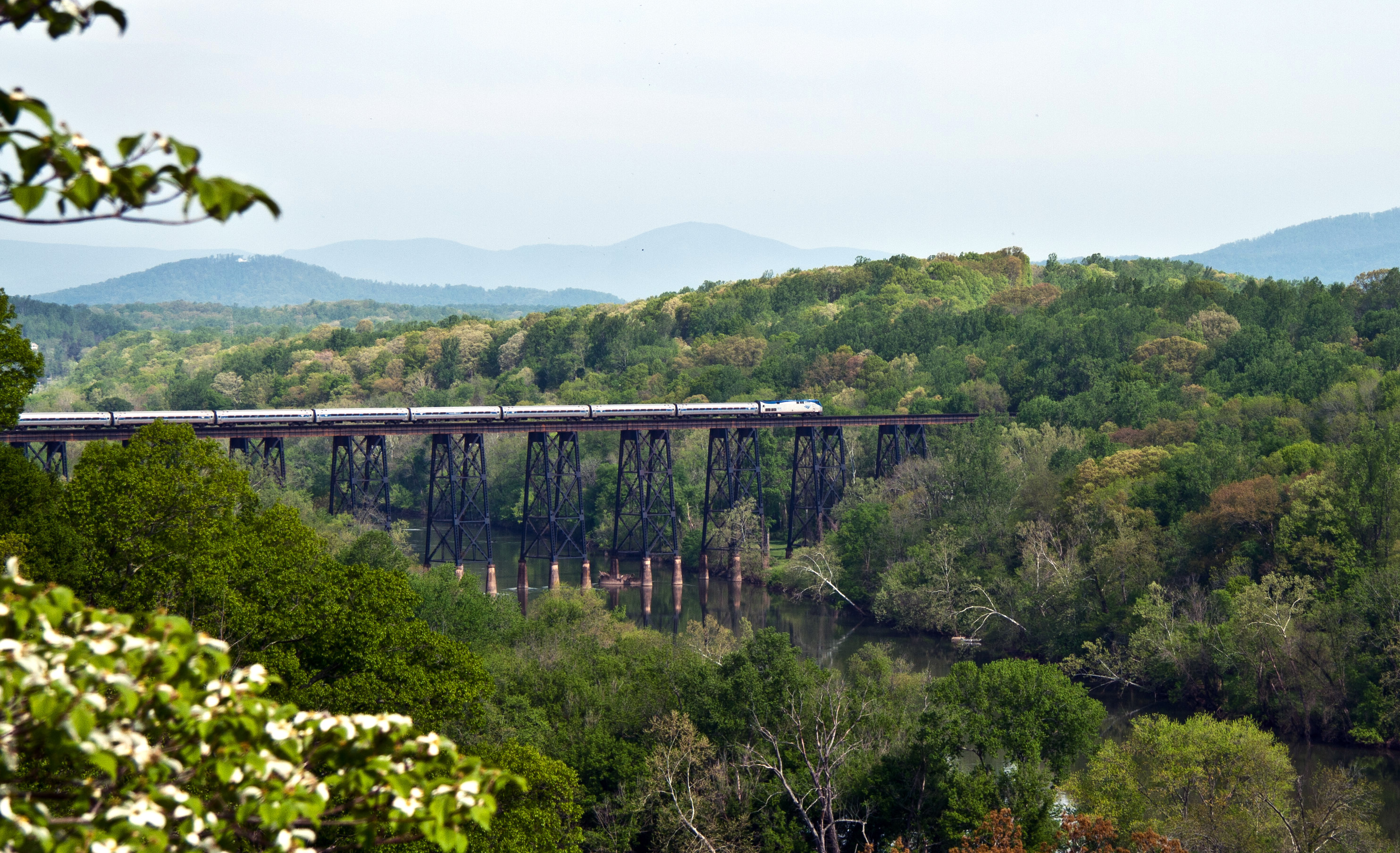
A Northeast Regional crossing the James River near Lynchburg, Virginia, in April 2011

Some Northeast Regional trains continue into Virginia, serving three branches to Norfolk, Newport News, and Roanoke, and serving points in between. These tracks are not electrified and are partially owned by both freight railroads and the Commonwealth of Virginia.

Virginia and Amtrak partnered in 2009 under the brand Amtrak Virginia to expand passenger rail service within the Commonwealth, making Virginia the 15th state to fund state services in addition to federally funded routes.

One daily Northeast Regional round trip was extended to from Washington to Lynchburg via Manassas and Charlottesville on October 1, 2009, supplementing the existing Crescent service. Service was extended from Lynchburg to Roanoke starting October 31, 2017. A second daily Roanoke round trip was added on July 11, 2022. Additionally, an infill station in Bedford, Virginia has been proposed.

On July 20, 2010, Amtrak added an additional Northeast Regional frequency from Washington to Richmond Staples Mill Road station, increasing the Washington-Richmond corridor to eight daily round trips with hourly northbound morning service. One round trip was extended from Richmond to Norfolk starting December 12, 2012. A second daily Norfolk round trip on weekdays was added on March 4, 2019. One round trip was extended from Staples Mill to Main Street in September 2021. Service changes on July 11, 2022, added an additional Norfolk weekday round trip (making three round trips on weekdays and two on weekends).

=== Planned expansion ===
==== New River Valley ====
In 2016, in the midst of the Lynchburg branch's extension to Roanoke, the New River Valley Metropolitan Planning Organization proposed lengthening the line further to the eponymous region, servicing the communities of Christiansburg, Blacksburg, and the campus of Virginia Tech. After reviewing multiple sites such as Dublin, Pulaski, and Merrimac, Amtrak Virginia and the Norfolk Southern Railway eventually agreed in 2024 to construct the station at Cambria Yard in Christiansburg, reactivating the original station last used in the 1970s.

On April 22, 2025, construction on Christiansburg station officially commenced, with a groundbreaking ceremony attended by Governor Glenn Youngkin being held at the site. Service is anticipated to open in 2027.

==== Long Island ====
In spring 2021, Amtrak proposed extending three Northeast Regional round trips from New York Penn Station to Ronkonkoma station along the Main Line of the Long Island Rail Road, with stops at Jamaica, Mineola, Hicksville, and Deer Park. The move would enable one-seat rides between Long Island and points south on the Northeast Corridor, provide express train service within Long Island, and connect JFK International Airport to the Amtrak network. In December 2023, the Federal Railroad Administration accepted the project into its Corridor Identification and Development Program, granting $500,000 toward service planning and prioritizing the route for future federal funding.

In January 2025, Suffolk County Executive Edward Romaine, along with Amtrak officials, officially announced the proposed extension. It was reported that work was expected to begin in 2026, and that Amtrak service was anticipated to commence in 2028, at the earliest. Trains would operate using diesel on Long Island. Required infrastructure upgrades for the service would likely include an additional platform and track at Ronkonkoma. Romaine said that Amtrak wanted the extension, in part, due to Ronkonkoma's location next to Long Island MacArthur Airport.

== Operation ==
=== Equipment ===
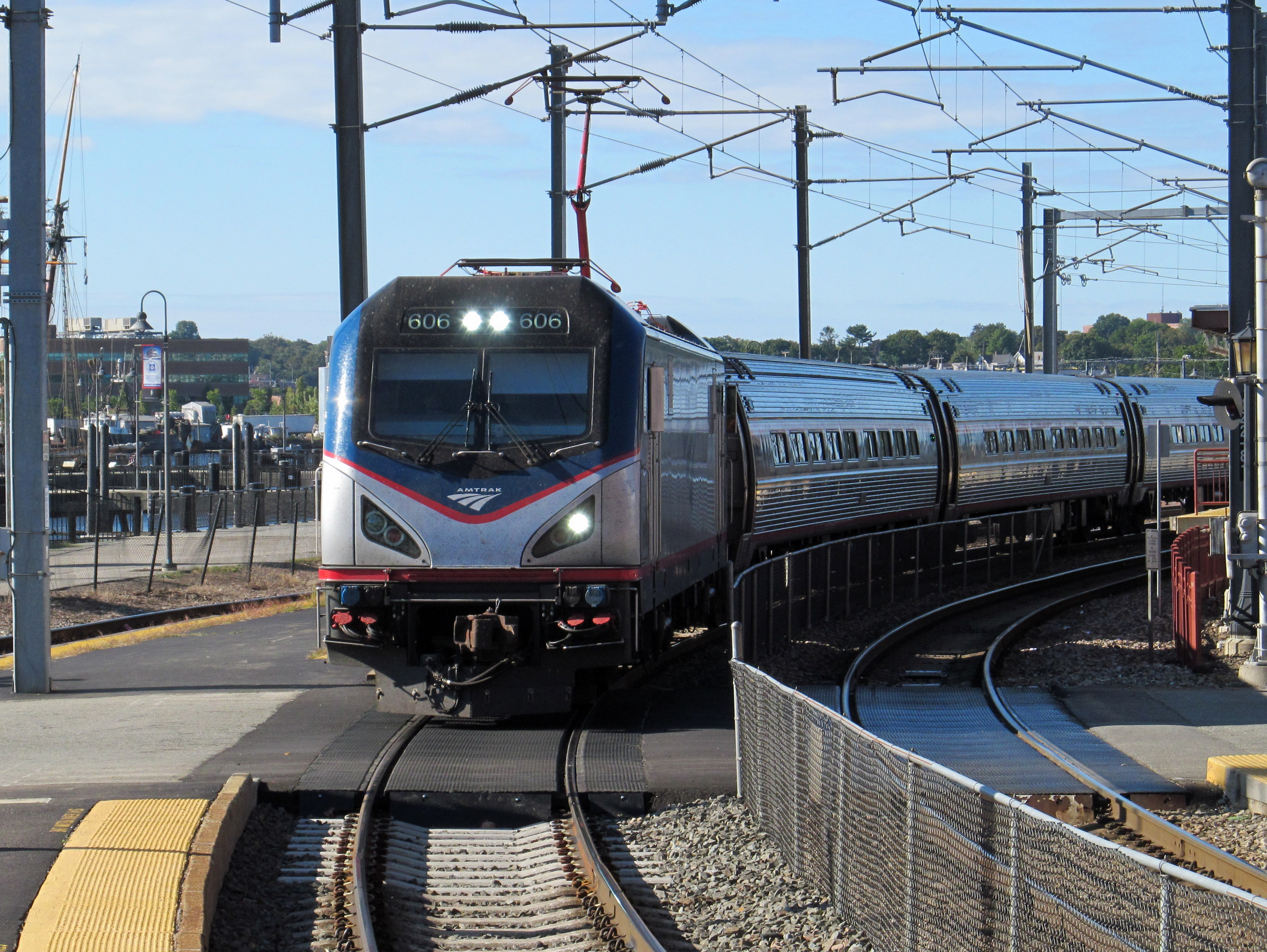
A typical Northeast Regional with an ACS-64 locomotive and Amfleet I passenger cars at New London Union Station in New London, Connecticut

As of 2019, most Northeast Regional trains consist of Amfleet I passenger cars hauled by an ACS-64 electric locomotive or a P-42DC diesel locomotive. Most trains include a business class car, a cafe car (food service/lounge), and 7 to 9 coach class cars, one of which is designated the Quiet Car, where passengers are asked to refrain from loud talking and mobile phone conversations.

Between Boston and Washington, D.C., the service has overhead electric wires and is pulled by Siemens ACS-64 electric locomotives at speeds up to 125 miles per hour (201 km/h). Northeast Regional trains operating south of Washington, into Virginia, and on the New Haven–Springfield Line use GE Genesis diesel locomotives which have a slightly lower top speed of 110 miles per hour (177 km/h).

Starting in 2027, the train's existing equipment is expected to be replaced by diesel-electric, dual-mode Amtrak Airo trainsets. The trainsets will include eight passenger cars with a cafe car, 6 Coach Class cars, and a Business Class car. The car nearest the locomotive will be an "Auxiliary Power Vehicle" (APV), equipped with a pantograph to draw power from overhead lines and supply electricity to four electric traction motors in the APV as well as in four motors in the locomotive. This design is intended to allow seamless transitions between diesel and electric operation, eliminating the need for a time-consuming locomotive change on through trains to Virginia and Springfield, Massachusetts.

On November 17, 2026, Amtrak announced the order of an additional eight, 10-car "high capacity" trainsets for the Northeast Regional, due to a surge in demand. Unlike the other Airo trainsets, the eight "higher-capacity" trainsets will have at least 640 seats, and each will be paired with two of 18 newly modernized ACS-64 locomotives, operating in push-pull configuration.

=== Classes of service ===
All classes of service include complimentary WiFi, an electric outlet (120 V, 60 Hz AC) at each seat, reading lamps, and fold-out tray tables. Reservations are required on all trains; tickets may be purchased online, over the phone, from a station agent, or via ticketing machine.

- Coach Class: 2×2 seating. Passengers self-select seats on a first-come, first-served basis.
- Business Class: 2×2 or 2×1 seating with more legroom than coach. Passengers receive a complimentary soft drink. Seats are assigned in advance.

=== Route ===
Northeast Regional route map

Most Northeast Regional trains operate over the Northeast Corridor between Boston and Washington (via New York, Philadelphia, and Baltimore). The corridor is owned, in part, by Amtrak, the Massachusetts Bay Transportation Authority (MBTA), Metro-North Railroad (MNRR), and the Connecticut Department of Transportation (CDOT).

- MBTA Attleboro Line: Boston to MA/RI state line (dispatched and maintained by Amtrak)
- Amtrak Northeast Corridor: MA/RI state line to New Haven, Connecticut
- CDOT New Haven Line: New Haven to CT/NY state line (dispatched and maintained by MNRR)
- MNRR New Haven Line: CT/NY state line to New Rochelle, New York
- Amtrak Northeast Corridor: New Rochelle to Washington, D.C.

Some trips diverge at New Haven and turn north to serve Springfield, Massachusetts, operating over Amtrak's New Haven–Springfield Line. Additional service on that line is provided by Amtrak's Hartford Line trains, which have timed transfers to and from many Northeast Regional trips.

Several trips continue south of Washington D.C. to Virginia, running to either Roanoke, Richmond, Newport News, or Norfolk. All Virginia services use the northernmost portion of the ex-Richmond, Fredericksburg and Potomac Railroad (now owned by CSX Transportation) between Washington and Alexandria, Virginia. South of Alexandria, trains to Roanoke use the Norfolk Southern Railway (ex-Southern Railway, ex-Virginia Midland Railway). Trains to Richmond, Norfolk and Newport News use the CSX RF&P, Richmond Terminal, and Bellwood subdivisions between Alexandria and Richmond.

South of Richmond, trains to Newport News use the CSX Peninsula Subdivision (ex-Chesapeake and Ohio Railway). Trains to Norfolk use the CSX North End Subdivision and Norfolk Southern's Norfolk District (ex-Norfolk and Western Railway).

=== Funding ===
Amtrak receives federal funding for its operations between Boston and Washington, D.C. Northeast Regional operations south of Washington are funded in part by the Commonwealth of Virginia. Operations along the New Haven–Springfield Line are funded by the State of Connecticut and the Commonwealth of Massachusetts.

== Stations ==
=== Boston–Washington, D.C. ===
State	Town/City	Station	Connections
Massachusetts	Boston	South Station	Amtrak: Acela, Lake Shore Limited; MBTA Commuter Rail: Fairmount Line, Framingham/Worcester Line, Fall River/New Bedford Line, Franklin/Foxboro Line, Needham Line, Greenbush Line, Kingston Line, Providence/Stoughton Line; MBTA subway: Red Line, Silver Line; MBTA bus Intercity bus service at South Station Bus Terminal
Massachusetts	Boston	Back Bay	Amtrak: Acela, Lake Shore Limited; MBTA Commuter Rail: Framingham/Worcester Line, Franklin/Foxboro Line, Needham Line, Providence/Stoughton Line; MBTA subway: Orange Line; MBTA bus
Massachusetts	Westwood	Route 128	Amtrak: Acela; MBTA Commuter Rail: Providence/Stoughton Line
Rhode Island	Providence	Providence	Amtrak: Acela; MBTA Commuter Rail: Providence/Stoughton Line; Rhode Island Public Transit Authority; Amtrak Thruway
Rhode Island	West Kingston	Kingston	Rhode Island Public Transit Authority
Rhode Island	Westerly	Westerly	Rhode Island Public Transit Authority
Connecticut	Mystic	Mystic	Southeast Area Transit
Connecticut	New London	New London	CTrail: Shore Line East; Southeast Area Transit
Connecticut	Old Saybrook	Old Saybrook	CTrail: Shore Line East; Estuary Transit District
Connecticut	New Haven	Union Station	Amtrak: Acela, Hartford Line, Vermonter; CTrail: Hartford Line, Shore Line East; Metro-North: ■ New Haven Line; CTtransit New Haven; Intercity bus: FlixBus, Greyhound, Peter Pan
Connecticut	Bridgeport	Bridgeport	Amtrak: Vermonter; Metro-North: ■ New Haven Line; Greater Bridgeport Transit Authority
Connecticut	Stamford	Stamford	Amtrak: Acela, Vermonter; Metro-North: ■ New Haven Line, New Canaan Branch; CTtransit Stamford; Intercity bus: Greyhound
New York	New Rochelle	New Rochelle	Metro-North: ■ New Haven Line; Bee-Line
New York	New York City	New York; Penn Station	Amtrak (long-distance): Cardinal, Crescent, Lake Shore Limited, Palmetto, Silver Meteor; Amtrak (intercity): Acela, Adirondack, Berkshire Flyer, Carolinian, Empire Service, Ethan Allen Express, Keystone Service, Maple Leaf, Pennsylvanian, Vermonter; Long Island Rail Road: ■ City Terminal Zone, ■ Port Washington Branch; NJ Transit: ■ North Jersey Coast Line, ■ Northeast Corridor Line, ■ Gladstone Branch, ■ Montclair–Boonton Line, ■ Morristown Line; NYC Subway: PATH: HOB-33 JSQ-33 JSQ-33 (via HOB); MTA Bus; Intercity bus: FlixBus, Tripper Bus, Vamoose Bus
New Jersey	Newark	Newark Penn Station	Amtrak: Acela, Cardinal, Carolinian, Crescent, Keystone Service, Palmetto, Pennsylvanian, Silver Meteor, Vermonter; Newark Light Rail; NJ Transit: ■ North Jersey Coast Line, ■ Northeast Corridor Line, ■ Raritan Valley Line; PATH: NWK-WTC; NJ Transit Bus; Intercity bus: FlixBus, Greyhound, Coach USA, Fullington Trailways
New Jersey	Newark	Newark Airport	AirTrain Newark to Newark Liberty International Airport; Amtrak: Keystone Service; NJ Transit: ■ North Jersey Coast Line, ■ Northeast Corridor Line
New Jersey	Iselin	Metropark	Amtrak: Acela, Crescent, Keystone Service, Palmetto, Vermonter; NJ Transit: ■ Northeast Corridor Line; NJ Transit Bus
New Jersey	New Brunswick	New Brunswick	Amtrak: Keystone Service; NJ Transit: ■ Northeast Corridor Line; NJ Transit Bus; Intercity bus: Flixbus, Suburban Transit
New Jersey	West Windsor	Princeton Junction	Amtrak: Keystone Service; NJ Transit: ■ Northeast Corridor Line, ■ Princeton Branch; NJ Transit Bus
New Jersey	Trenton	Trenton	Amtrak: Cardinal, Carolinian, Crescent, Keystone Service, Palmetto, Pennsylvanian, Silver Meteor, Vermonter; NJ Transit: ■ Northeast Corridor Line, ■ River Line; SEPTA Regional Rail: ■ Trenton Line; SEPTA Suburban Bus, NJ Transit Bus
Pennsylvania	Philadelphia	30th Street Station	Amtrak: Acela, Cardinal, Carolinian, Crescent, Keystone Service, Palmetto, Pennsylvanian, Silver Meteor, Vermonter; SEPTA Regional Rail: all lines NJ Transit: ■ Atlantic City Line; SEPTA Metro: SEPTA City Bus, SEPTA Suburban Bus, NJ Transit Bus; Intercity bus: Martz Trailways
Delaware	Wilmington	Wilmington	Amtrak: Acela, Cardinal, Carolinian, Crescent, Palmetto, Silver Meteor, Vermonter; SEPTA Regional Rail: ■ Wilmington/Newark Line; DART First State; Intercity bus: Greyhound
Delaware	Newark	Newark	SEPTA Regional Rail: ■ Wilmington/Newark Line; Cecil Transit, DART First State; Intercity bus: FlixBus
Maryland	Aberdeen	Aberdeen	MARC: ■ Penn Line; Harford Transit; Intercity bus: Greyhound
Maryland	Baltimore	Penn Station	Amtrak: Acela, Cardinal, Carolinian, Crescent, Palmetto, Silver Meteor, Vermonter; MARC: ■ Penn Line; Light RailLink; MTA Maryland, Charm City Circulator
Maryland	Hanover	BWI Airport	Amtrak: Acela, Crescent, Vermonter; MARC: ■ Penn Line; Shuttle to Baltimore/Washington International Airport; MTA Maryland, UMBC Transit
Maryland	New Carrollton	New Carrollton	Amtrak: Vermonter; MARC: ■ Penn Line; Metro: Orange Line, Silver Line; Metrobus, TheBus, MTA Maryland; Intercity bus: Greyhound
Washington, D.C.	District of Columbia	Washington; Union Station	Amtrak: Acela, Cardinal, Carolinian, Crescent, Floridian, Palmetto, Silver Meteor, Vermonter, Amtrak Thruway; MARC: ■ Brunswick Line, ■ Camden Line, ■ Penn Line; Virginia Railway Express: ■ Manassas Line, ■ Fredericksburg Line; Metro: Red Line; Metrobus, MTA Maryland, Loudoun County Transit, PRTC Buses; Intercity bus: FlixBus, Greyhound, BestBus, Peter Pan, OurBus

=== Springfield–New Haven ===
State	Town/City	Station	Connections
Massachusetts	Springfield	Springfield	Amtrak: Lake Shore Limited, Hartford Line, Vermonter, Valley Flyer; CTrail: Hartford Line; Pioneer Valley Transit Authority; Intercity bus: Greyhound, Peter Pan
Connecticut	Windsor Locks	Windsor Locks	Amtrak: Hartford Line, Vermonter, Valley Flyer; CTrail: Hartford Line; CTtransit
Connecticut	Windsor	Windsor	Amtrak: Hartford Line, Valley Flyer; CTrail: Hartford Line; CTtransit
Connecticut	Hartford	Hartford	Amtrak: Hartford Line, Vermonter, Valley Flyer; CTrail: Hartford Line; CTtransit Hartford; BRT: CTfastrak; Intercity bus: Greyhound, Peter Pan
Connecticut	Kensington	Berlin	Amtrak: Hartford Line, Valley Flyer; CTrail: Hartford Line; CTtransit New Britain
Connecticut	Meriden	Meriden	Amtrak: Hartford Line, Vermonter, Valley Flyer; CTrail: Hartford Line; CTtransit Meriden
Connecticut	Wallingford	Wallingford	Amtrak: Hartford Line, Valley Flyer; CTrail: Hartford Line; CTtransit Wallingford
Connecticut	New Haven	State Street	Amtrak: Hartford Line, Valley Flyer; CTrail: Hartford Line, Shore Line East; Metro-North: ■ New Haven Line; CTtransit New Haven
Connecticut	To New Haven Union Station		

=== Washington, D.C.–Newport News / Norfolk ===
State	Town/City	Station	Connections
District of Columbia	From Washington Union Station		
Virginia	Alexandria	Alexandria	Amtrak: Cardinal, Carolinian, Crescent, Crescent, Floridian, Silver Meteor, Silver Star; VRE: ■ Fredericksburg Line, ■ Manassas Line; Metro: Blue Line, Yellow Line; Metrobus, DASH
Virginia	Woodbridge	Woodbridge	VRE: ■ Fredericksburg Line; OmniRide
Virginia	Quantico	Quantico	Amtrak: Carolinian; VRE: ■ Fredericksburg Line; OmniRide
Virginia	Fredericksburg	Fredericksburg	Amtrak: Carolinian, Silver Meteor; VRE: ■ Fredericksburg Line; FRED
Virginia	Ashland	Ashland	
Virginia	Richmond	Richmond Staples Mill Road	Amtrak: Carolinian, Floridian, Palmetto, Silver Meteor; Greater Richmond Transit Company; Amtrak Thruway
Virginia	Service to Newport News, Virginia		
Virginia	Richmond	Richmond–Main Street	Local bus: Greater Richmond Transit Company
Virginia	Williamsburg	Williamsburg	Hampton Roads Transit, Williamsburg Area Transit Authority
Virginia	Newport News	Newport News; Transportation Center	Hampton Roads Transit; Amtrak Thruway
Virginia	Service to Norfolk, Virginia		
Virginia	Ettrick	Petersburg	Amtrak: Carolinian, Floridian, Palmetto, Silver Meteor
Virginia	Norfolk	Norfolk	Tide Light Rail; Amtrak Thruway

=== Washington, D.C.–Roanoke ===
State	Town/City	Station	Connections
Virginia	From Alexandria Union Station		
Virginia	Burke	Burke Centre	VRE: ■ Manassas Line; Metrobus, Fairfax Connector
Virginia	Manassas	Manassas	Amtrak: Cardinal, Crescent; VRE: ■ Manassas Line; OmniRide
Virginia	Culpeper	Culpeper	Amtrak: Cardinal, Crescent
Virginia	Charlottesville	Charlottesville	Amtrak: Cardinal, Crescent, Amtrak Thruway; Charlottesville Area Transit
Virginia	Lynchburg	Lynchburg	Amtrak: Crescent; Greater Lynchburg Transit Company
Virginia	Roanoke	Roanoke	Valley Metro, SmartWay; Amtrak Thruway
