= Greater Lynchburg Transit Company =

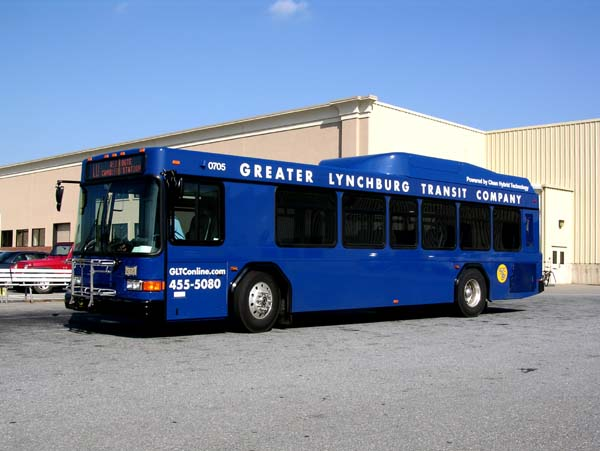
- Founded: 1974
- Headquarters: Lynchburg, Virginia
- Locale: Lynchburg, Virginia
- Service area: Lynchburg, Virginia & Liberty University
- Service type: Local & campus shuttle bus service
- Fleet: 39 (2008)
- Annual ridership: 2,396,700 (2015)
- Operator: First Transit
- Website: www.gltconline.com

The Greater Lynchburg Transit Company (GLTC) is the non-profit, publicly owned company responsible for providing bus service for Lynchburg, Virginia, since its creation in 1974. The GLTC Board of Directors sets and is responsible for both the general policies as well as the selection of the management company responsible for operation the service. The Board is composed of nine-members that are appointed by the Lynchburg City Council. As of 2015, First Transit is responsible for the operation of the network, and their subsidiary, Central Virginia Transit Management Company is oversees the actual employment of the GLTC's bus drivers, mechanics, and other staff.

GLTC serves a population of 80,846 in an area covering 72 square miles (186.5 km^{2}), and in 2006 totaled 1,117,971 unlinked passenger trips.

== Routes ==
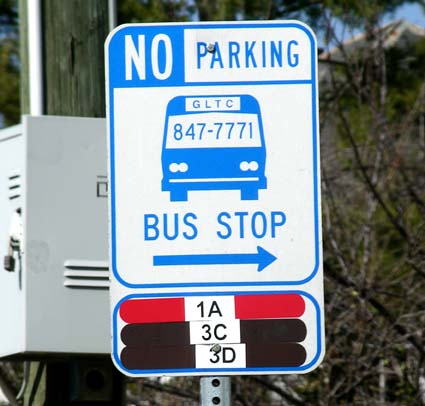
Typical GLTC bus stop signage

GLTC operates ten bus routes.

== Liberty University shuttle service ==
On November 10, 2006, the GLTC entered an agreement with Liberty University to operate the shuttle bus service on its campus. Service would commence on January 15, 2007, with six buses serving the campus. The service operates from 7 a.m. to midnight Monday through Thursday; from 7 a.m. to 1 a.m. Friday and Saturday; and from 8 a.m. to 10 p.m. Saturday and Sunday. Serving Liberty's main, north and east campuses, the system originally consisted of eight stops. Costing $1,000,000 annually for the service, Liberty students and employees can utilize the shuttle service without paying a fare each time.

By November 2007, the service saw its 1,000,000th passenger, which doubled the average annual ridership for the GLTC as a whole. With ridership for the service growing from 3,900 passengers per day in spring 2007 to 7,400 in fall 2007, university officials are working in conjunction with the GLTC to expand the service to include areas off campus in the area around the university.

== Bus fleet ==
As of 2008, GLTC operates a mixture of 34 diesel and diesel-electric hybrid Gillig Low Floor buses. It also operates 12 Ford/Supreme E-450 for paratransit and a Chance VS-24 replica trolley.

== See also ==
- Transportation in Virginia
