= Valley Metro (Roanoke) =

Urban-suburban bus line based in Roanoke

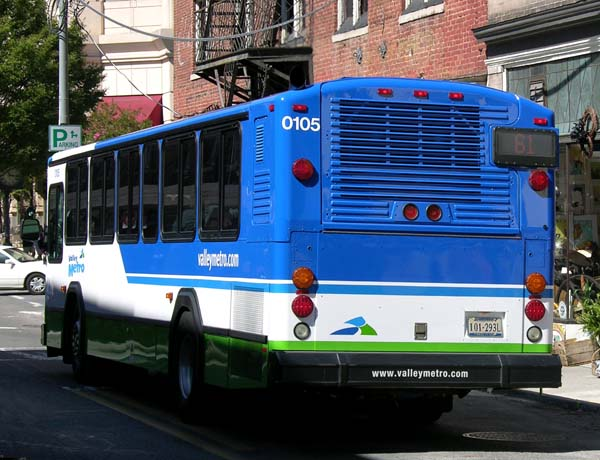
- Parent: Greater Roanoke Transit Company
- Founded: 1975
- Headquarters: 1108 Campbell Avenue SE, Roanoke, Virginia
- Service area: Roanoke, Salem, Vinton and portions of Roanoke County.
- Service type: bus service
- Routes: 20
- Hubs: Third Street Station
- Daily ridership: Around 3,600 per day (FY2023)
- Operator: First Transit
- Website: http://www.valleymetro.com

Valley Metro, the operational name for the Greater Roanoke Transit Company, is a local government-owned urban-suburban bus line based in Roanoke, Virginia with First Transit providing the general and assistant general managers. The staff is employed by Southwest Virginia Transit Management Company, a First Transit subsidiary. Valley Metro serves the independent cities of Roanoke and Salem, the town of Vinton, and limited unincorporated portions of Roanoke County. Valley Metro has a fleet of 42 buses and 7 paratransit vehicles, and many lines originate and/or terminate at Campbell Court, a central bus station in downtown Roanoke which is also served by Greyhound. In FY 2023 the system got around 3,600 boardings per day according to the DRPT.

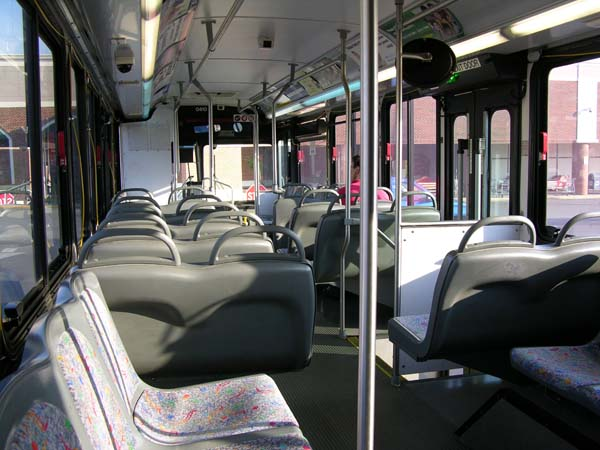
Typical Valley Metro bus interior

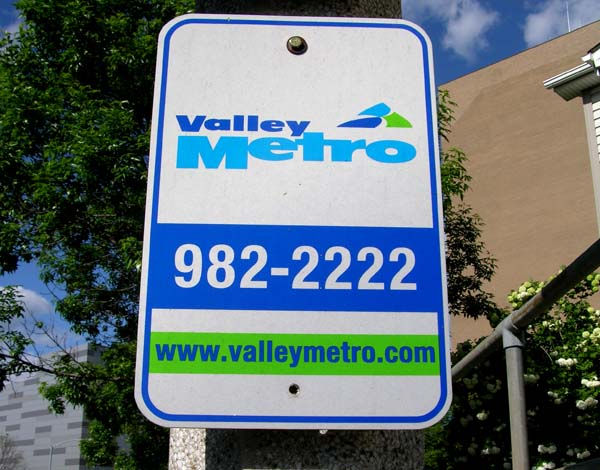
Typical Valley Metro bus stop signage

== Services offered ==
=== Bus ===
Effective June 1, 2010, Valley Metro buses only stop at designated bus stops. Before as previous to this buses would stop at every corner. Many passengers have expressed disapproval of this new policy. Valley Metro officials state that the changes are necessary to keep buses on schedule as ridership has increased.

As of January 1, 2018, Valley Metro operates the following bus routes:

- 11&12: Valley View Mall to Campbell Court via Hershberger/Cove Roads
- 15&16: Valley View Mall to Campbell Court via Grandview/Greenland Avenues
- 21&22: Crossroads Mall to Campbell Court via Williamson Road
- 25&26: Crossroads Mall to Campbell Court via Hollins/Hershberger Roads
- 31&32: Vinton to Campbell Court via Campbell Avenue/King Street
- 31X: Roanoke Centre for Industry and Technology (RCIT) to Campbell Court via Orange Avenue (only operates during rush hour)
- 35&36: Vinton to Campbell Court via Dale/Washington Avenues
- 41&42: Southeast Roanoke to Campbell Court
- 51&52: Tanglewood Mall to Campbell Court via Avenham Avenue/Jefferson Street
- 55&56: Tanglewood Mall to Campbell Court via Franklin Rd/Colonial Ave
- 61&62: Brambleton/Red Rock to Campbell Court
- 65&66: Carlton/Grandin to Campbell Court
- 71&72: LewisGale Hospital to Campbell Court
- 75&76: Veterans Hospital to Campbell Court
- 81&82: Lakeside Plaza Salem to Campbell Court via Melrose Avenue (only operates during rush hour)
- 85&86: Peters Creek Road to Campbell Court
- 91&92: Goodwill Industries in Salem to Campbell Court via LewisGale Hospital, Veterans Hospital, and Melrose Avenue

==== Smart Way Bus ====
Valley Metro operates the Smart Way Bus, which serves Roanoke, Christiansburg, Blacksburg, and Virginia Tech. Its service to Roanoke includes connections to the Amtrak station, which opened on October 31, 2017.

=== Star Line Trolley ===
The Star Line Trolley is a free service along Jefferson Street between downtown Roanoke and the Carilion Roanoke Memorial Hospital. Service is from 7:00 AM to 7:00 PM Monday through Friday.

=== Civic Center Shuttles ===
Free shuttles run from the Elmwood Garage in downtown Roanoke to the Roanoke Civic Center during events.

=== Paratransit (S.T.A.R.) ===
Valley Metro offers a paratransit service called Specialized Transit - Arranged Rides (S.T.A.R.), operated by RADAR Transit, for individuals with disabilities who are unable to ride a traditional Valley Metro bus. It serves the entire city of Roanoke, the town of Salem, and the city of Salem. Applications must be submitted in order to ride. Customers call at least one day in advance to reserve a ride.
