= Pelican (train) =

Former American passenger rail service

- Southern's advertisement touting the Pelican service

Overview
- Service type: Inter-city rail
- Status: Discontinued
- Locale: Northeastern United States/Southeastern United States
- Last service: 1970
- Former operator: Southern Railway

Route
- Termini: New York, New York; New Orleans, Louisiana
- Distance travelled: 1,114 mi (1,793 km)
- Average journey time: Southbound: 36 hrs 40 min; northbound: 38 hrs 50 min
- Train number: Southbound: 41; northbound: 42

On-board services
- Seating arrangements: Reclining seat coaches
- Sleeping arrangements: Open sections, roomettes, double bedrooms
- Catering facilities: Diner car, cafe-lounge

The Pelican was a named train of the Southern Railway which ran from New York City to New Orleans and back until 1970.

== Operations ==
The Pelican (train #41) departed New York's Pennsylvania Station going south via the Pennsylvania Railroad to Washington, D.C., then on Southern's line to Lynchburg, Virginia, then to Bristol, Virginia via the Norfolk and Western Railway with a major stop in Roanoke, Virginia and several stops toward Bristol. From Bristol to New Orleans, the Pelican ran on Southern's line with major station stops in Knoxville, Tennessee, Chattanooga, Tennessee, Birmingham, Alabama, and Meridian, Mississippi. South of Birmingham it made more local stops than other Southern Railway trains on the Birmingham-New Orleans route, such as the Southerner.

Train #42, the northbound Pelican, reversed the route.

In 1957, the Pelican carried:

- A New York to New Orleans 10-roomette-6-double-bedroom sleeping car;
- A New York to Knoxville 10-roomette-6-double-bedroom car;
- A Washington to Shreveport 8-section-5-double-bedroom car (handled by Illinois Central Railroad's Southwestern Limited between Meridian and Shreveport);
- A New York to Knoxville 10-roomette-6-double-bedroom car;
- A New York to Bristol 10-roomette-6-double-bedroom car;
- A Washington to Williamson 10-roomette-6-double-bedroom car (handled by Norfolk and Western Railway's Cavalier between Roanoke and Williamson);
- A Petersburg to Bristol 10-section-1-compartment-2-double-bedroom car (handled by Norfolk and Western Railway's Cavalier between Petersburg and Roanoke);
- A Roanoke to Birmingham dining car;
- Washington to New Orleans coaches.

Into the 1950s, the train carried through sleeping cars which would split from the main route at Meridian and continue on the Illinois Central Railroad's Southwestern Limited into central Mississippi and central Louisiana to Shreveport, Louisiana. Timetables referred to section, compartment, and drawing room accommodations carrying from New York to Shreveport

== History ==
O. Winston Link recorded the eastbound Pelican arriving in Rural Retreat, Virginia on December 24, 1957. The recording is noted as being one of the last recordings of a Norfolk and Western Class J locomotive as well as the chimes from the nearby church. The actual details are all steam power was discontinued on the Bristol Line (Radford, VA to Bristol, VA) after December 31, 1957. The Class J locomotives continued in passenger service on other divisions until April 1959.

With passenger traffic declining, the Pelican was combined with the Birmingham Special in 1970.
