= Birmingham Special =

Historical passenger rail service

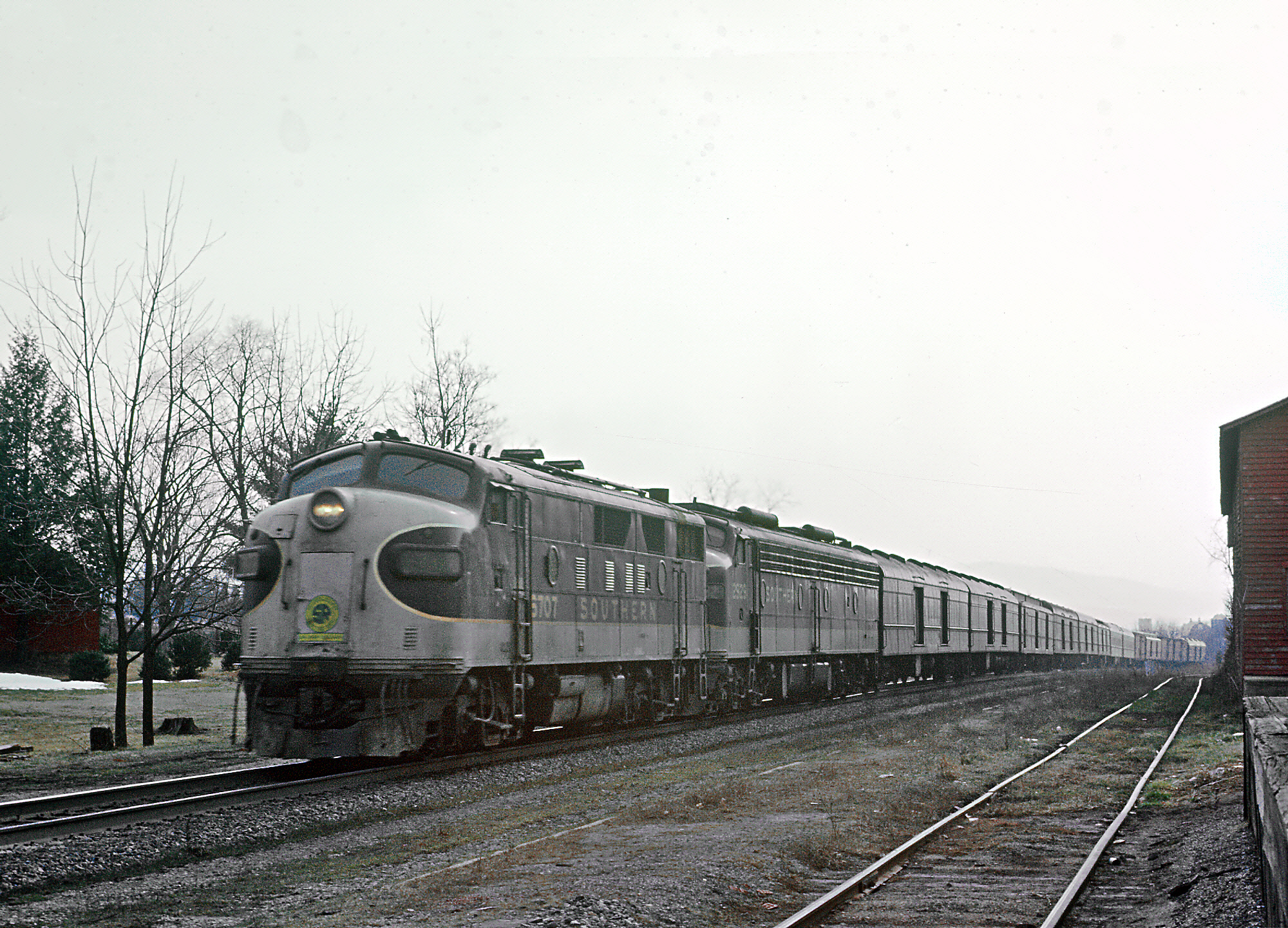
- The Birmingham Special in the final months of its service. Seen here at Somerset, Virginia, March 1969

Overview
- Service type: Inter-city rail
- Status: Discontinued
- Locale: Northeastern United States/Southeastern United States
- First service: May 17, 1909
- Last service: February 1, 1970
- Former operator(s): Southern Railway, Norfolk and Western Railway, Pennsylvania Railroad

Route
- Termini: New York, New York; Birmingham, Alabama
- Distance travelled: 987.4 miles (1,589.1 km)
- Service frequency: Daily
- Train number(s): Southbound: 17, northbound: 18 (1952)

On-board services
- Seating arrangements: Reclining seat coaches
- Sleeping arrangements: Open sections, roomettes, double bedrooms & drawing rooms (1952)
- Catering facilities: Diner; restaurant-lounge

The Birmingham Special was a passenger train operated by the Southern Railway, Norfolk and Western Railway, and Pennsylvania Railroad in the southeastern United States. The train began service in 1909 and continued, with alterations, after Amtrak assumed control of most long-haul intercity passenger rail in the United States on May 1, 1971. The Birmingham Special is the namesake of the famed Glenn Miller big band tune "Chattanooga Choo Choo".

The Southern Railway introduced the Birmingham Special on May 17, 1909, running between Birmingham, Alabama and New York City via Atlanta, Georgia and Washington, D.C. The Southern operated the train between Birmingham and Washington, while the Pennsylvania Railroad carried through cars between Washington and New York. The train consisted of coaches, Pullman sleepers, and a dining car. Its road numbers on the Southern Railway were #29 (southbound) and #30 (northbound).

On May 15, 1932, the Southern re-routed the Birmingham Special via Chattanooga, Tennessee, Knoxville, Tennessee and Bristol, bypassing Atlanta. The Norfolk and Western Railway hauled the train between Lynchburg, Virginia and Bristol, creating an unusual (though not unique) situation of the Birmingham Special using two unconnected sections of the Southern Railway: Washington–Lynchburg and Bristol–Birmingham. Into the 1950s the train consist included several types of sleeping accommodations for the New York-Birmingham train.

The Pennsylvania ended through service north of Washington in 1956. By 1964 the sleeper service had been eliminated. However, the longer route, along the same trackage as far south as Chattanooga, the Southern's Pelican, retained sleeping cars. Through service to Memphis, Tennessee (connecting in Chattanooga) ended on January 31, 1967. The Southern Railway dropped the Birmingham Special name on February 1, 1970. Service south of Bristol ended August 11, 1970, although a rump train operated north from Birmingham to the Alabama/Tennessee border for a few more months. The train was the last to serve Chattanooga's Terminal Station.

The Norfolk & Western joined Amtrak upon the latter's start on May 1, 1971. However, Amtrak chose not to operate the Lynchburg–Bristol portion of the train. The Southern Railway, which had not initially joined Amtrak, continued to operate the unnamed train between Washington and Lynchburg until June 1, 1975, designating it #7 (southbound) and #8 (northbound). The Southern Railway joined Amtrak in 1979.
