= Clifton station (VRE) =

Train station in Clifton, Virginia, US

Clifton
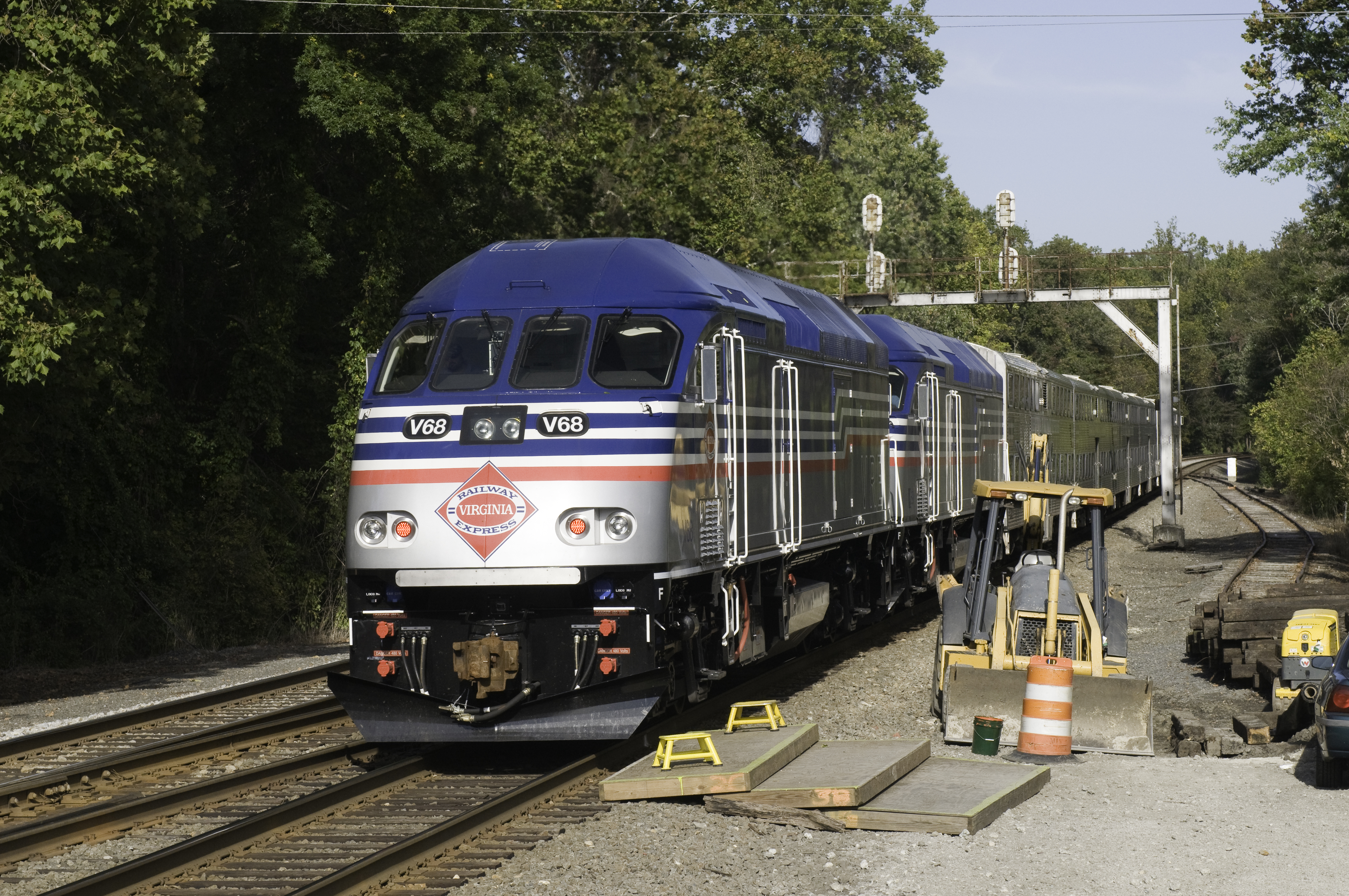
- VRE train at Clifton station in October 2011

General information
- Location: 7142 Main Street, Clifton, Virginia
- Coordinates: 38.781215°N 77.386253°W
- Line: NS Washington District
- Platforms: 1 temporary side platform
- Tracks: 2

Services
Preceding station	Virginia Railway Express	Following station
Manassas Park toward Manassas	Manassas Line Special events only	Burke Centre toward Rolling Road
Former services
Preceding station	Southern Railway	Following station
Manassas toward Birmingham	Main Line	Fairfax toward Washington, D.C.
Location

Clifton station is a limited-use Virginia Railway Express train station in Clifton, Virginia. The location serves as a station stop during special seasonal events in the town, most notably the town's annual Clifton Day. It is served by special Manassas Line trains running between Manassas station and Rolling Road station. A temporary platform is erected for when the station is in use.
