= Monticello Freeway =

The Monticello Freeway was a planned freeway that was a part of the 1969 Northern Virginia Major Thoroughfare Plan. The proposal was to connect Arlington directly to Manassas as an Interstate, hence its name freeway. The plan overall was turned down due to environmental, preservation, and financial issues. Parts of the freeway would have been where Braddock Road is located.

== The Freeway ==
=== Arlington County ===
The Monticello Freeway would have begun at another proposed highway as part of the 1969 NOVA Major Thoroughfare Plan. The road would have started at a trumpet interchange at the proposed Four Mile Run Expressway at modern-day Virginia State Route 120. The freeway would have been within the boundaries of Arlington County for about a mile and a half before going into Fairfax County for no more than a fraction of a mile. From there, the freeway would enter the western boundaries of the City of Alexandria.

=== Alexandria City ===
Like Arlington County, the freeway would have not been in the boundaries of Alexandria for long. Its prime purpose would be to serve as a three-way interchange between Virginia State Route 236 and Interstate 395. It then would have replaced Braddock Road as it entered Fairfax County in Annandale.

=== Fairfax County ===
Had the freeway been built in Fairfax County, the freeway would have gone through the regions of Annandale, Burke, Fairfax Station and the southern outskirts of Clifton before crossing Bull Run into Prince William County.
