= Burke, Virginia =

Unincorporated section of Fairfax County, Virginia

- Census-designated place
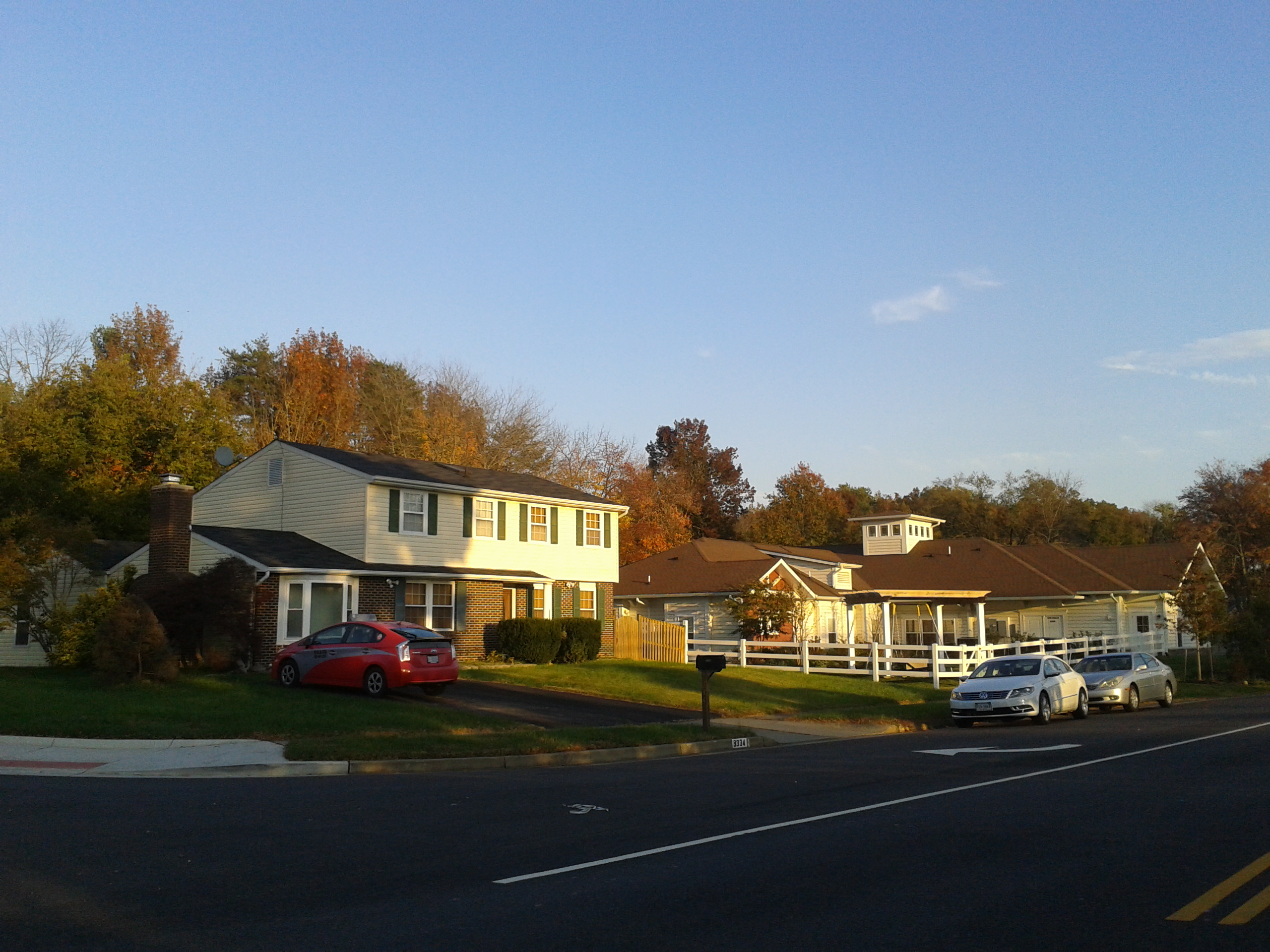
- Houses in Burke in October 2016

- Location of Burke in Fairfax County, Virginia

- Location within Northern Virginia Location within Virginia Location within the United States
- Coordinates: 38°46′53″N 77°16′15″W
- Country: United States
- State: Virginia
- County: Fairfax
- Named for: Silas Burke

Area
  - Total: 8.7 sq mi (22.6 km^{2})
  - Land: 8.6 sq mi (22.3 km^{2})
  - Water: 0.12 sq mi (0.3 km^{2})
- Elevation: 256 ft (78 m)

Population (2020)
  - Total: 42,312
  - Density: 4,771/sq mi (1,842.1/km^{2})
- Time zone: UTC−5 (Eastern (EST))
  - Summer (DST): UTC−4 (EDT)
- ZIP Codes: 22009, 22015
- Area codes: 703, 571
- FIPS code: 51-11464
- GNIS feature ID: 1494192

Burke is an unincorporated section of Fairfax County, Virginia, United States, traditionally defined as the area served by the Burke post office (Zip Code 22015). Burke includes two census-designated places: the Burke CDP, population 42,312 in 2020 and the Burke Centre CDP, population 17,518 in 2020.

== History ==
Burke is named after Silas Burke (1796–1854), who built a house on a hill overlooking the valley of Pohick Creek in approximately 1824. Burke was a farmer, merchant, and local politician. He was a judge, sheriff, director of the Orange and Alexandria Railroad Company, president of the Fairfax Agricultural Society and the Fairfax Turnpike Company, among other leadership titles. He was also an overseer of the Fitzhugh’s plantation, which meant that he managed the Fitzhugh’s slaves and farming tasks. Burke also had personal slaves for his own farm. The Silas Burke house still stands.

When the Orange and Alexandria Railroad was constructed in the late 1840s, the railroad station at the base of that hill was named "Burke's Station" after Burke, who owned the land in the area and donated a right-of-way to the railroad company. The community that grew up around the railroad station acquired a post office branch in 1852. The railroad tracks located on the same historical line are owned by the Norfolk Southern Railway and form part of the Manassas Line of the Virginia Railway Express commuter rail system, which has two stations (Rolling Road and Burke Centre) in the Burke area. The original Burke Station building can still be seen in the community, turned 90 degrees from its historical footprint.

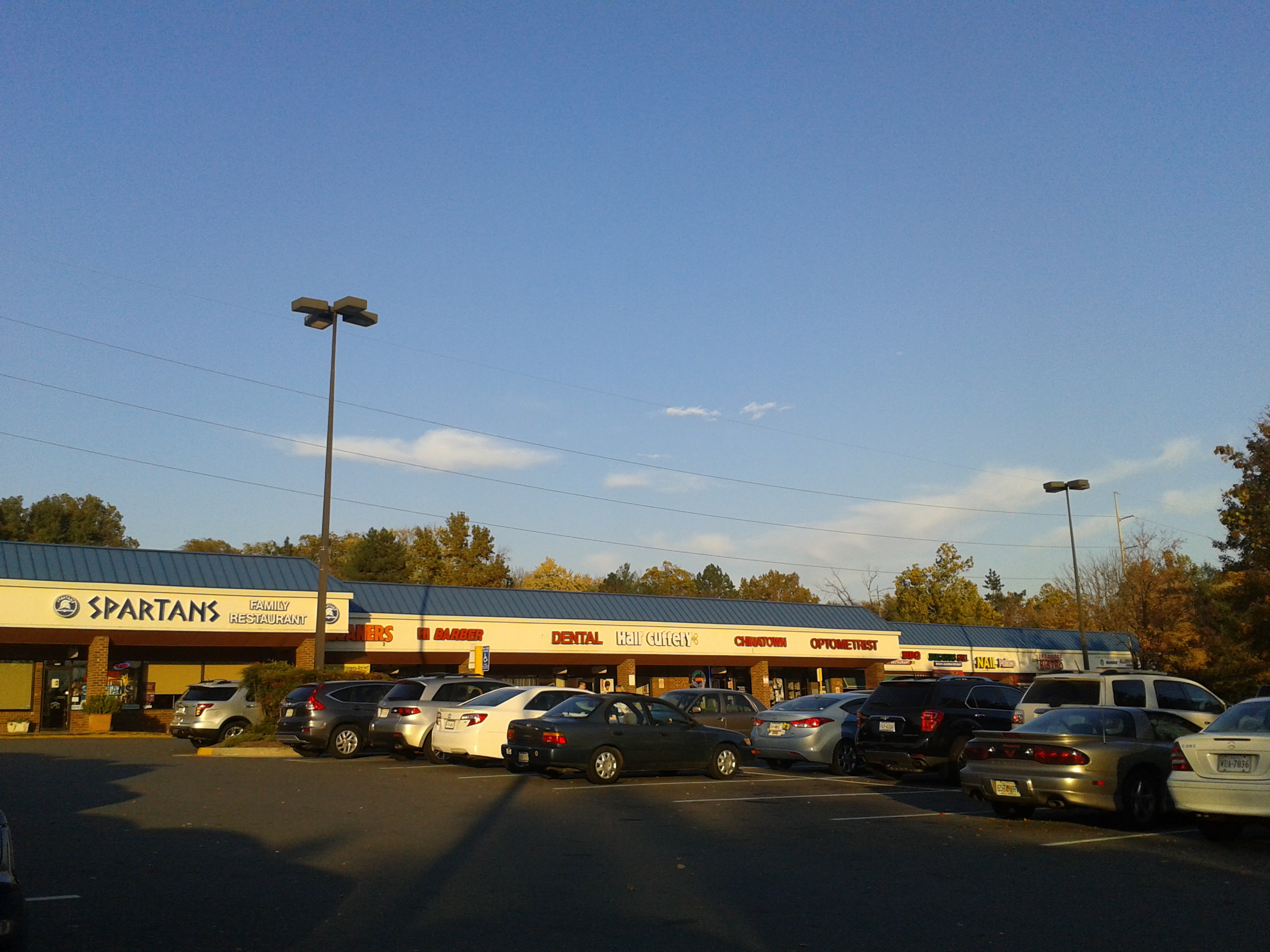
Strip mall in Burke

During the Civil War, the railway station was garrisoned by Union troops. The Bog Wallow Ambush occurred nearby in 1861. On December 28, 1862, Confederate cavalry under General J.E.B. Stuart raided the station. Stuart seized supplies from the area, destroyed a nearby bridge, monitored Union messages passing over the telegraph lines, and then famously sent a telegram to Union Quartermaster General Montgomery C. Meigs complaining of the poor quality of the mules he had captured. Further action was seen in the neighborhood in 1863.

In 1903, Henry C. Copperthite changed the name of the post office from Burke's Station to Burke after buying the Burke House and 241 acres (98 ha) to build a racetrack for trotting and pacing horses. Copperthite was a wealthy man and the largest non-government employer in Washington, D.C.; in 1914 his factory in Georgetown produced 50,000 pies a day, earning him the nickname "King of Pie". Copperthite built four hotels, stables and expanded the general store. Burke became a popular summer destination where people attended fairs and saw horse races, foot races, motorcycle races, exhibition boxing matches and baseball games. Trains ran to Burke from Washington Union Station in Washington, D.C., Alexandria, Prince William, and Loudoun counties and as far away as Richmond. Copperthite installed the first phones in Burke, and his stables housed the horses of President McKinley and Vice President Theodore Roosevelt. The site of the racetrack is marked by a historic marker erected by Fairfax County in 2016.

The area remained predominantly rural into the mid-20th century. After World War I, Burke's population grew as federal government workers moved into the area within easy commuting distance to Washington.

In 1951, the U.S. Civil Aeronautics Administration announced plans to condemn 4,520 acres (1,830 ha) of land in Burke to construct a second airport to serve the Washington metropolitan area. After a lengthy lobbying campaign by area residents, the government in 1958 selected a different site near Chantilly, Virginia, which would become Washington Dulles International Airport. Land that had been purchased to build the airport was later developed into Burke Lake Park and the planned community of Burke Centre.

The first large subdivision in the vicinity, Kings Park, was constructed beginning in 1960, and was followed by many others over the next two decades, converting Burke into a densely populated suburban community.

A historic marker in Burke denotes the Huldah Coffer House, owned by a prominent resident of the county for many years. Another privately erected historical marker indicates the site of the former Lee Chapel Methodist church, which was intentionally burned in 1951 after having been abandoned for some years, but whose cemetery remains on the site.

== Historic sites ==
- Mulberry Hill (c. 1790), located at 9417 Windsor Way
- Silas Burke House (original c. 1820; rebuilt c. 1853), located at 9617 Burke Lake Road
- Burke Methodist Church/Burke Station (c. 1857), located at 9415 Old Burke Lake Road Burke
- Little Zion Baptist Church and Cemetery (1891), located at 10018 Burke Lake Road

Burke

== Geography and climate ==
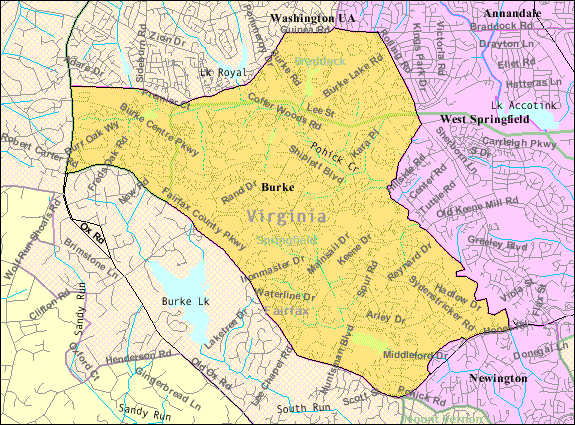
Map of the Burke CDP

Burke is located south of the center of Fairfax County at 38°46′53″N 77°16′15″W (38.781480, −77.270750). The Burke CDP is bordered by the CDPs of Burke Centre to the west, Kings Park West to the northwest, Long Branch and Wakefield to the north, Kings Park to the northeast, West Springfield to the east, Newington Forest to the south, and South Run to the southwest. Burke Lake Park, which borders the Burke CDP to the southwest and is not part of any CDP, is a large recreational park operated by the Fairfax County Park Authority, featuring a golf course and woodland surrounding Burke Lake.

According to the United States Census Bureau, the Burke CDP has a total area of 8.7 square miles (22.6 km^{2}), of which 8.6 square miles (22.3 km^{2}) is land and 0.1 square miles (0.3 km^{2}), or 1.22%, is water. Most of the water making up Burke consists of artificial ponds and lakes.

Climate data for Burke
Month	Jan	Feb	Mar	Apr	May	Jun	Jul	Aug	Sep	Oct	Nov	Dec	Year
Mean daily maximum °F (°C)	44 (7)	49 (9)	58 (14)	69 (21)	78 (26)	85 (29)	89 (32)	87 (31)	81 (27)	70 (21)	59 (15)	48 (9)	68 (20)
Mean daily minimum °F (°C)	24 (−4)	26 (−3)	33 (1)	42 (6)	52 (11)	61 (16)	66 (19)	65 (18)	58 (14)	45 (7)	36 (2)	28 (−2)	45 (7)
Average precipitation inches (mm)	3.48 (88)	3.01 (76)	4.13 (105)	3.54 (90)	4.42 (112)	3.69 (94)	4.26 (108)	3.98 (101)	4.30 (109)	3.48 (88)	3.41 (87)	3.41 (87)	45.11 (1,145)
Source: Weather.com

== Demographics ==
Historical population
Census	Pop.	Note	%±
1980	33,835		—
1990	57,734		70.6%
2000	57,737		0.0%
2010	41,055		−28.9%
2020	42,312		3.1%
U.S. Decennial Census; 1950 1960 1970; 1980 1990 2000; 2010

=== Racial and ethnic composition ===
Burke CDP, Virginia – Racial and ethnic composition Note: the US Census treats Hispanic/Latino as an ethnic category. This table excludes Latinos from the racial categories and assigns them to a separate category. Hispanics/Latinos may be of any race.
Race / Ethnicity (NH = Non-Hispanic)	Pop 2000	Pop 2010	Pop 2020	% 2000	% 2010	% 2020
White alone (NH)	40,354	24,953	22,856	69.89%	60.78%	54.02%
Black or African American alone (NH)	2,856	2,522	2,978	4.95%	6.14%	7.04%
Native American or Alaska Native alone (NH)	95	58	52	0.16%	0.14%	0.12%
Asian alone (NH)	8,443	7,018	7,749	14.62%	17.09%	18.31%
Native Hawaiian or Pacific Islander alone (NH)	44	19	22	0.08%	0.05%	0.05%
Other race alone (NH)	141	139	240	0.24%	0.34%	0.57%
Mixed race or Multiracial (NH)	1,513	1,171	2,407	2.62%	2.85%	5.69%
Hispanic or Latino (any race)	4,291	5,175	6,008	7.43%	12.61%	14.20%
Total	57,737	41,055	42,312	100.00%	100.00%	100.00%

=== 2020 census ===
As of the 2020 census, Burke had a population of 42,312. The population density was 4,920.0 inhabitants per square mile (1,897.4/km^{2}). The median age was 40.9 years. 25.6% of residents were under the age of 18 and 16.2% of residents were 65 years of age or older. For every 100 females there were 96.8 males, and for every 100 females age 18 and over there were 93.2 males age 18 and over.

100.0% of residents lived in urban areas, while 0.0% lived in rural areas.

There were 13,656 households, of which 41.9% had children under the age of 18 living in them. Of all households, 71.9% were married-couple households, 8.7% were households with a male householder and no spouse or partner present, and 17.0% were households with a female householder and no spouse or partner present. About 11.9% of all households were made up of individuals and 6.4% had someone living alone who was 65 years of age or older.

There were 13,880 housing units, of which 1.6% were vacant. The average housing unit density was 1,614.0 per square mile (622.4/km^{2}). The homeowner vacancy rate was 0.3% and the rental vacancy rate was 3.7%.

Racial composition as of the 2020 census
Race	Number	Percent
White	23,891	56.5%
Black or African American	3,056	7.2%
American Indian and Alaska Native	153	0.4%
Asian	7,791	18.4%
Native Hawaiian and Other Pacific Islander	24	0.1%
Some other race	2,095	5.0%
Two or more races	5,302	12.5%
Hispanic or Latino (of any race)	6,008	14.2%

=== American Community Survey ===
According to the American Community Survey, the average family household had 3.41 people. The largest ancestry group was the 13.7% who had German ancestry, 35.1% spoke a language other than English at home, and 25.3% were born outside the United States, 73.8% of whom were naturalized citizens.

The median income for a household in the CDP was $172,432, and the median income for a family was $176,970. 11.9% of the population were military veterans, and 65.0% had a bachelor's degree or higher. In the CDP 2.0% of the population was below the poverty line, including 1.2% of those under age 18 and 3.0% of those age 65 or over, with 5.3% of the population without health insurance.

=== 2000 census ===
As of the census of 2000, there were 59,830 people, 19,215 households, and 15,756 families residing in the community. Burke is the largest community in Virginia recognized by the Census Bureau, other than counties and incorporated cities (although 11 cities and Arlington, Virginia have greater populations). The population density was 5,008.0 inhabitants per square mile (1,933.6/km^{2}). There were 19,367 housing units at an average density of 1,679.9 per square mile (648.6/km^{2}). The racial makeup of the CDP was 74.36% White, 14.66% Asian, 5.04% African American, 3.27% from two or more races, 0.21% Native American, 0.08% Pacific Islander, and 2.37% from other races. Hispanic or Latino of any race were 7.43% of the population.

There were 19,215 households, out of which 44.0% had children under the age of 18 living with them, 70.6% were married couples living together, 8.7% had a female householder with no husband present, and 18.0% were non-families. 13.4% of all households were made up of individuals, and 2.9% had someone living alone who was 65 years of age or older. The average household size was 2.99 and the average family size was 3.30.

The population distribution by age is 27.9% under the age of 18, 7.3% from 18 to 24, 28.6% from 25 to 44, 30.6% from 45 to 64, and 5.5% who were 65 years of age or older. The median age was 38 years. For every 100 females there were 95.1 males. For every 100 females age 18 and over, there were 91.1 males.

According to a 2007 estimate, the median income for a household in Burke is $113,034, and the median income for a family was $125,905. Males had a median income of $66,149 versus $41,933 for females. The per capita income for the CDP was $34,936. About 1.5% of families and 2.3% of the population were below the poverty line, including 2.4% of those under age 18 and 6.0% of those age 65 or over.

== Education ==
=== Primary and secondary schools ===
Elementary and secondary school students in Burke are served by the Fairfax County Public School System. The elementary schools in Burke are White Oaks, Terra Centre, Fairview and Cherry Run, although students also attend Ravensworth and Kings Park/Kings Glen as well Sangster. Burke is home to Lake Braddock Secondary School, though many students within the district attend Robinson Secondary School and West Springfield High School, as well as South County High School. Christian families might send their children to attend Nativity Catholic School, which is a nationally certified STEM School of Excellence for the 2024-2025 and 2025-2026 school years and won the award from the ITEEA in 2025.

=== Public libraries ===
Fairfax County Public Library operates the Pohick Regional Library, the Burke Centre Library, and the Kings Park Library in the CDP.

== Transportation ==
Burke is served by two Virginia Railway Express stations, Burke Centre and Rolling Road, both on the Manassas Line. The former is also an Amtrak station. It is also served by the Washington Metrobus system, via the 17A, B, G, H, K, and L and the 18G, H, J, P, R, and S routes, with rush-hour-only service to the Pentagon and Springfield Metro stations.

== Recreation and events ==
=== Recreation ===
Along the boundaries of adjoining Fairfax Station, Burke Lake Park is an 888-acre (3.59 km^{2}) park centered on a 218-acre (0.88 km^{2}) recreational lake. The park contains a 4.68-mile (7.53 km) jogging trail, campsites, numerous picnic and sports areas, an 18-hole par three golf course with driving range, a disc golf course, miniature golf course, boat rental, amphitheater, ice cream parlor, carousel, and miniature train ride which is no longer operated.

=== Events ===
- From April through December, the Burke Farmers Market takes place each Saturday morning, from 8 a.m. to 12 p.m., in the Burke Centre VRE station parking lot.
- Burke Centre hosts a fall festival for two days, every September.

== Communities ==
Burke Centre is a 1,700-acre (690 ha) planned community that was formerly part of the Burke CDP but is now a separate census-designated area. It is located west of Burke and is divided into five subcommunities: The Commons, The Landings, The Oaks, The Ponds and The Woods. Other notable communities in the Burke area include Rolling Valley West, Burke Village I & II, Lakepointe, Longwood Knolls, Burke Lake Meadows, Edgewater, Lake Braddock, Signal Hill, Crownleigh, and Cherry Run along with Burke Station Square.

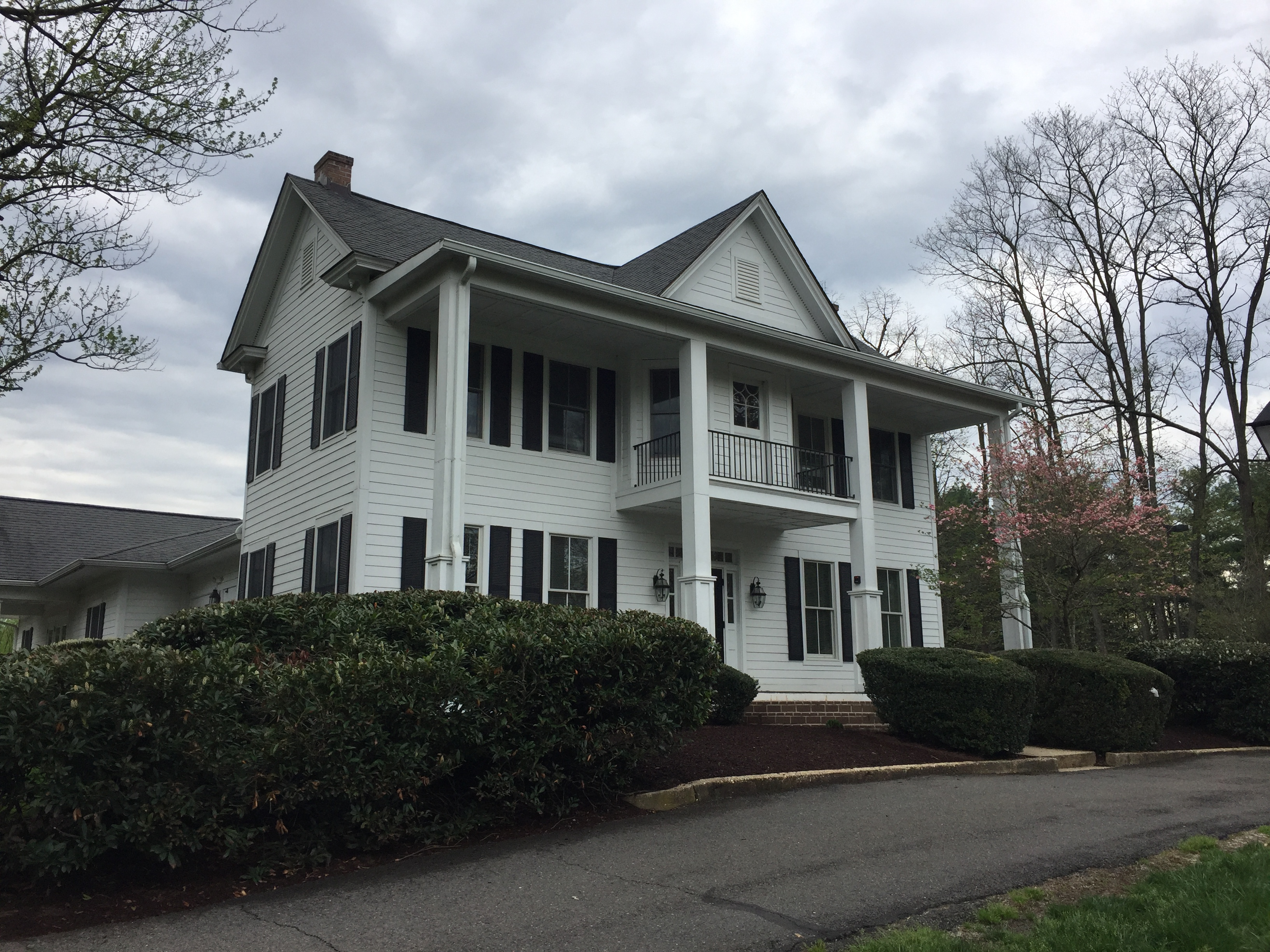
Located in Burke Centre VA, the historic Huldah Coffer House was built in 1876

=== Nearby towns, communities, etc. ===
All distances are by road from Burke Station, the original settlement of Burke:

- Annandale (5 miles NE)
- Clifton (8 miles W)
- Fairfax (5 miles NW)
- Lorton (9 miles SE)
- Springfield (6 miles E)

== Notable people ==
- Retesh Bhalla, aka Sonjay Dutt, professional wrestler
- Hubert Davis, head coach of the University of North Carolina men's basketball team, former professional basketball player
- Chad Dukes, Washington-area radio personality
- Glennon Doyle, blogger and author
- Tiffany Dupont, actress
- Greg Eklund, drummer for Everclear
- Mia Hamm, American retired professional soccer player, two-time Olympic gold medalist, and two-time FIFA Women's World Cup champion who attended Lake Braddock Secondary School in Burke
- Nikki Hornsby, singer- songwriter, musician, NARAS member
- Allen Johnson, gold medalist in 1996 Olympics in Atlanta (110 metre hurdles) and a four-time world champion; attended Lake Braddock Secondary School
- Nguyễn Ngọc Loan, South Vietnamese general and chief of the South Vietnamese National Police, subject of an iconic Vietnam-era picture by Eddie Adams
- David W. Marsden, Virginia state senator
- John William Minton, aka Big John Studd, former professional wrestler
- Travis Morrison, member of the band The Dismemberment Plan
- Justin Roczniak, YouTuber and podcaster
- Byron Saxton, WWE announcer
- Ronald J. Shurer, US Army special forces staff sergeant and medic (retired), Medal of Honor recipient
- Mary Simpson, violinist
- Timothy L. Smith, historian and educator
- Joseph Sobran, journalist and writer for the National Review
- Justin Spring, Olympic medal-winning gymnast
