= Chapel Road Park =

Park in Fairfax County, Virginia, US

- Interactive map of Chapel Road Park
- Location: 12300 Chapel Rd, Clifton, Virginia 20124
- Coordinates: 38°46′44″N 77°22′19″W
- Operator: Fairfax County Park Authority
- Open: All year

Chapel Road Park is a 25 acres (10 ha) park one mile east of Clifton in Fairfax County, Virginia.

== Description ==
Chapel Road Park is managed by the Fairfax County Park Authority. The adjacent area is sparsely developed due to a land-use restrictions to protect the water supply for Fairfax County.

The park is crossed by Popes Head Creek, contains a non-tidal marsh and hiking trails, and offers birding.

== See also ==
- Fairfax County Park Authority
- Clifton, Virginia
