= Northern Virginia Transportation Commission =

Transportation agency in Northern Virginia, USA

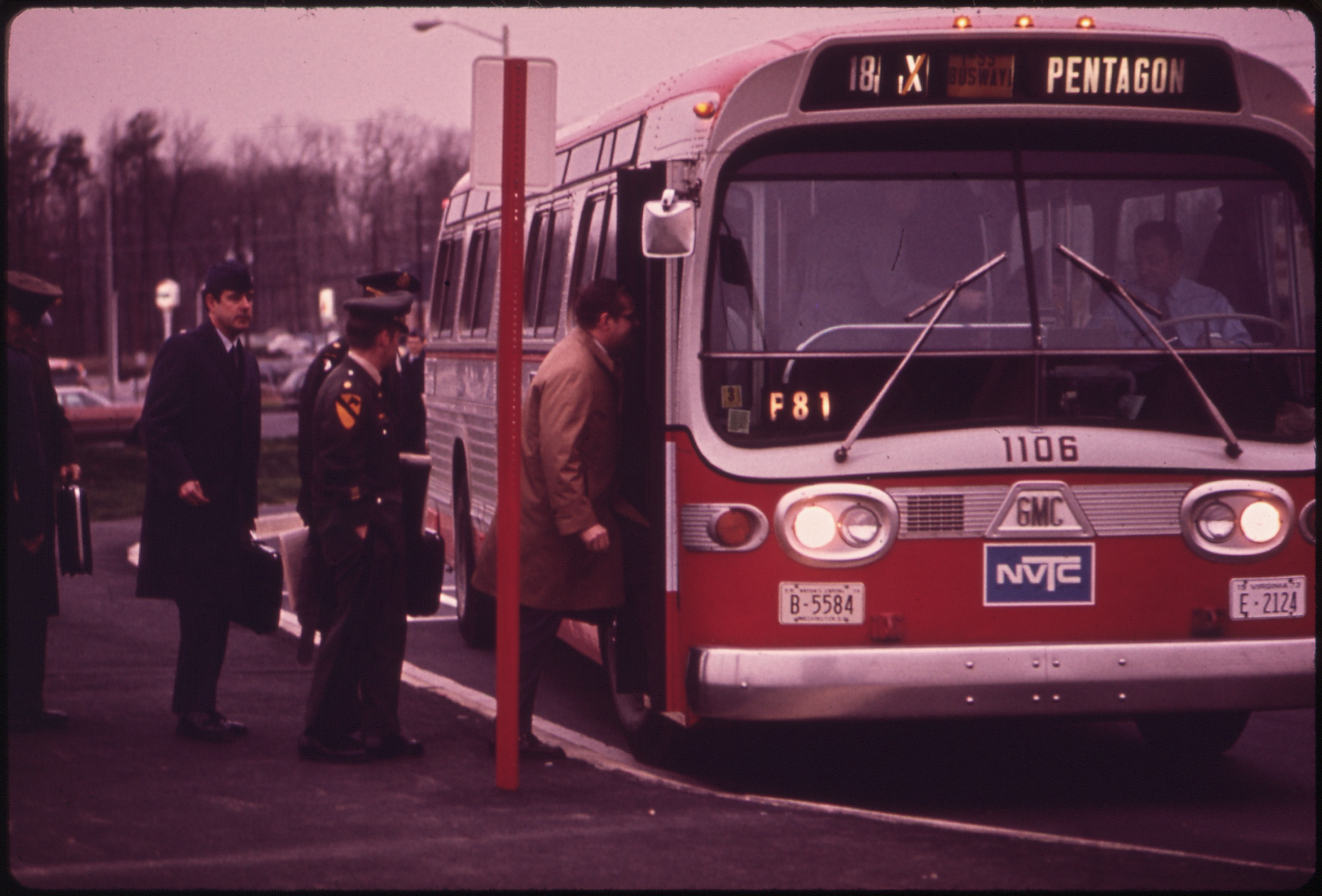
A Northern Virginia Transportation Commission GM "New Look" bus in 1973 at a park-and-ride in Springfield, Virginia before it was converted into a Washington Metro station.

The Northern Virginia Transportation Commission (NVTC) is an independent agency in the Commonwealth of Virginia to promote and improve transportation. It covers the Counties of Arlington, Fairfax, Loudoun, and the Cities of Alexandria, Falls Church, and Fairfax. NVTC manages the Northern Virginia Transportation District. That District was created by the 1964 Acts of Assembly of the Commonwealth of Virginia, chapter 630; and the Transportation District Act.

The primary role of the Commission is to collect a tax surcharge to fund Virginia's share of the Washington Metro system and to appoint four representatives to the Washington Metropolitan Area Transit Authority (WMATA) board. Such funds are "dedicated" to support the Metro system meaning that Virginia agreed to be legally obligated to match the federal contributions toward the Metro systems capital expenditures. Traditionally, the Commission selected some of its own members to serve on the WMATA Board. However, in June 2010, Virginia Governor Bob McDonnell threatened to withhold Virginia's "dedicated" payment to WMATA unless the Commission appointed at least two people of his choosing to the WMATA Board. On June 24, 2010, McDonnell withdrew his request to appoint two members of the Metro Board as a precondition for making the scheduled "dedicated" payment under the 2008 agreement.

Together with the Potomac and Rappahannock Transportation Commission, NVTC operates the Virginia Railway Express commuter rail system.

The American Public Transit Association selected NVTC as the outstanding government agency for 1996.
