= Culpeper station =

Train station in Culpeper, Virginia, US

Culpeper, VA
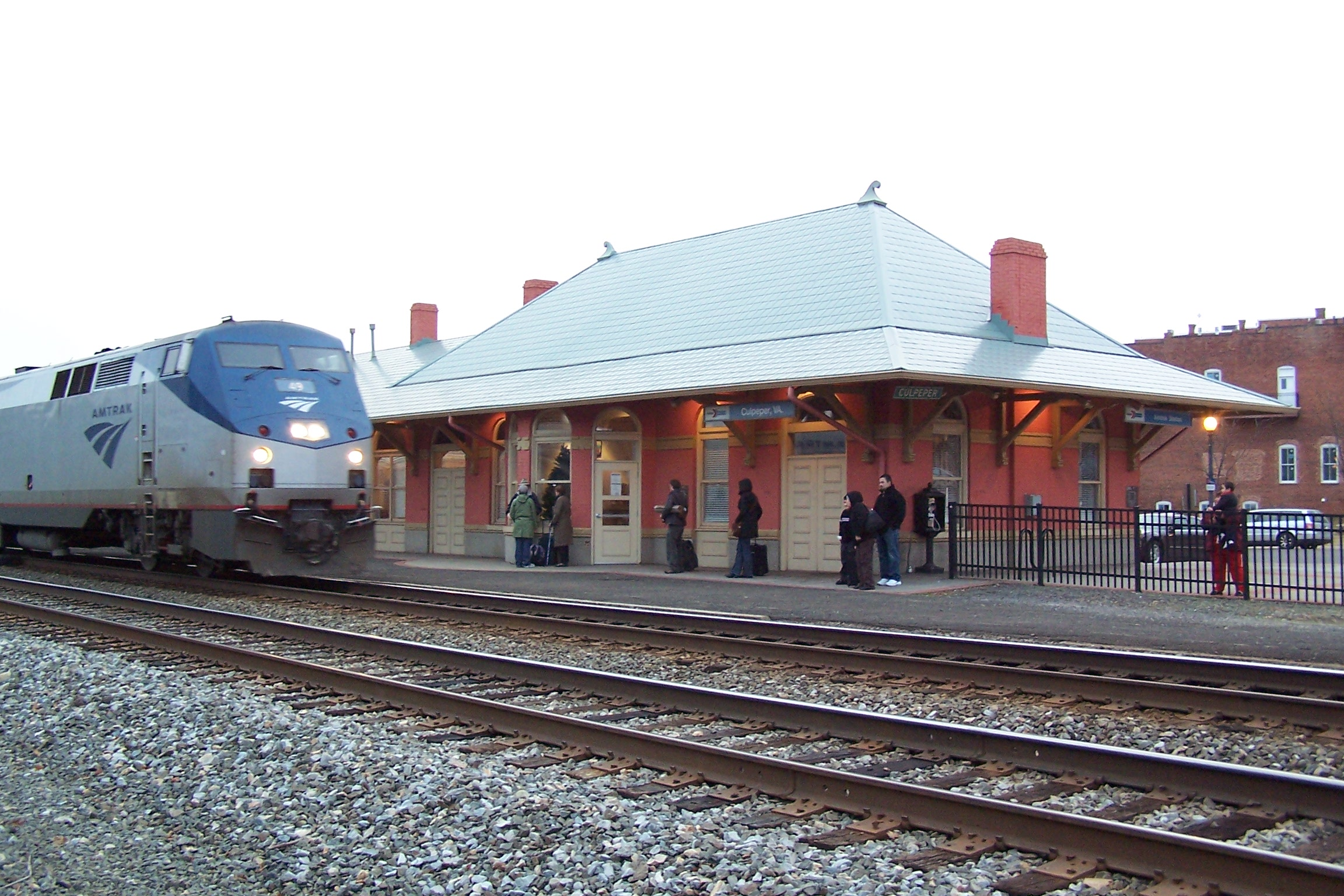
- A Cardinal arrives at Culpeper in 2008.

General information
- Location: 109 South Commerce Street; Culpeper, Virginia; United States
- Coordinates: 38°28′20″N 77°59′36″W
- Line: NS Washington District
- Platforms: 1 side platform
- Tracks: 2

Construction
- Accessible: Yes

Other information
- Station code: Amtrak: CLP

Passengers
- FY 2025: 21,372 (Amtrak)

Services
Preceding station	Amtrak	Following station
Charlottesville toward Chicago	Cardinal	Manassas toward New York
Charlottesville toward New Orleans	Crescent	Manassas toward New York
Charlottesville toward Roanoke	Northeast Regional	Manassas toward Boston South or Springfield
Former services
Preceding station	Chesapeake and Ohio Railway	Following station
Orange toward Cincinnati	Main Line	Calverton toward Washington, D.C.
Preceding station	Southern Railway	Following station
Winston toward Birmingham	Main Line	Inlet toward Washington, D.C.
Location

Culpeper station is a train station in Culpeper, Virginia. It was built in 1904 by the Southern Railway, replacing an 1874 station house which itself replaced two stations originally built by the Orange and Alexandria Railroad. It is currently served by Amtrak's long-distance Cardinal and Crescent routes, along with two daily Northeast Regional trains with final stops in New York or Boston to the north and Roanoke to the south.

When then-owner Norfolk Southern Railway tried to demolish a portion of the depot in 1985, a citizens' committee formed to save the building. In 1995, the town successfully prepared a $700,000 renovation grant under the Virginia Department of Transportation Enhancement Program. Three years later, Norfolk Southern sold the depot to the town, and in 2000 the renovated building opened to the public. Additional work to the freight section was completed in 2003.
