= Randy Thompson =

American singer-songwriter

Randy Thompson is a Virginia based americana/country music singer and songwriter. He is a resident of the Clifton, Virginia area.

He has toured in France, Norway, Austria, United Kingdom, Germany, Switzerland and the United States. As of 2018 he has released 6 albums; 4 have reached the top 40 on US charts.

- In The Rain – 1988
- Wearin Blue – 1998 (Jackpot Records 1001)
- That's Not Me – 2004 (Jackpot Records 1105)
- Further On – 2008 (Jackpot Records)
- Collected – 2012 (Jackpot Records)
- War, Peace, Love, Fear – 2017 (Jackpot Records)

== Chart success ==
- #6 Freeform Americana Roots (FAR Chart #105, April 2008)
- #28 Americana Music Chart (The Nielson Co., April 2008)
- #12 Roots Music Report (April 2008)
- #26 XM Cross Country Chart (March 30, 2008)
- #16 Euro Americana Chart (June 2008)
- #5 European Hotdisc Chart (For Single Ol' 97, March 2008)
- #3 European Hotdisc Chart (For Single Further On, December 2008)
- #1 European Hotdisc Independent Chart (For Single Further On, December 4, 2008)
