= Backlick Road station =

Rail station in Springfield, Virginia

Backlick Road
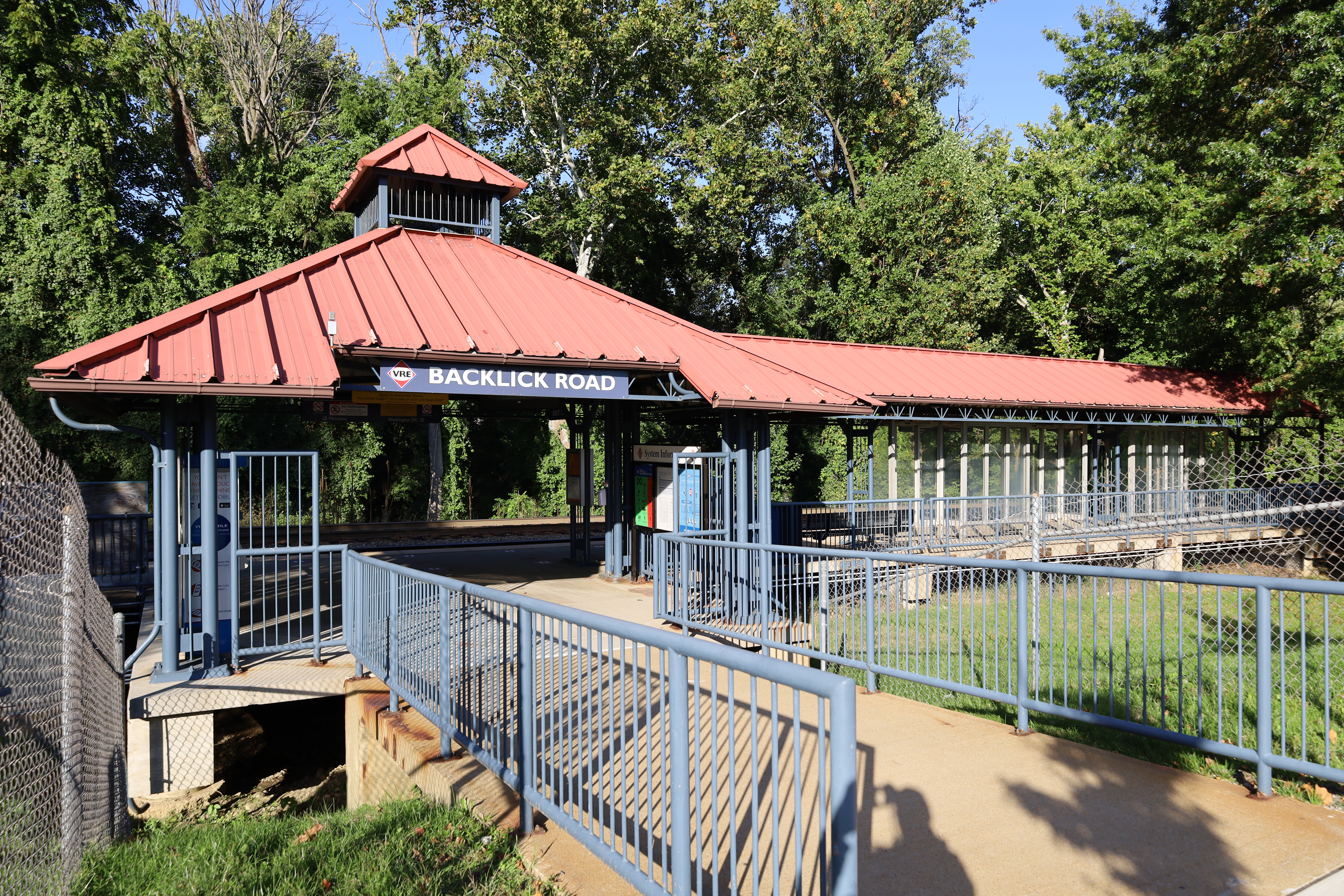
- Station shelter in 2020

General information
- Location: 6900 Hechinger Drive; Springfield, Virginia; United States
- Coordinates: 38°47′49″N 77°11′02″W
- Line: NS Washington District
- Platforms: 1 side platform
- Tracks: 2
- Connections: Fairfax Connector: 321, 322, 401, 402

Construction
- Parking: 220 spaces
- Cycle facilities: Bicycle racks
- Accessible: Yes

Other information
- Fare zone: 3

History
- Opened: 1992

Services
Preceding station	Virginia Railway Express	Following station
Rolling Road toward Broad Run	Manassas Line	Alexandria toward Union Station
Location

Backlick Road station is a Virginia Railway Express (VRE) commuter rail station in Springfield, Virginia. It is served by the Manassas Line. The station has one side platform serving the southern track of the two-track Norfolk Southern Railway Washington District.

== History ==
The station serves a right-of-way first laid down in the 1840s by the Orange and Alexandria Railroad (O&A). During the American Civil War, the O&A's Springfield station, which stood on or near the site of today's facility, was briefly seized by Confederate troops in 1861, recaptured by Union troops, and raided again the following year.

The right-of-way passed via successor railroads to its current owner, Norfolk Southern. Additional trackage rights are held by VRE and Amtrak, whose Cardinal and Crescent trains pass through Backlick Road station but do not stop there.

The current station opened in 1992 as one of the original VRE stations. Planned upgrades include a 290-foot platform extension, lighting improvements, and communication system upgrades to accommodate longer trains and improve rider safety and comfort.
