= Manassas Park station =

Rail station in Manassas Park, Virginia

Manassas Park
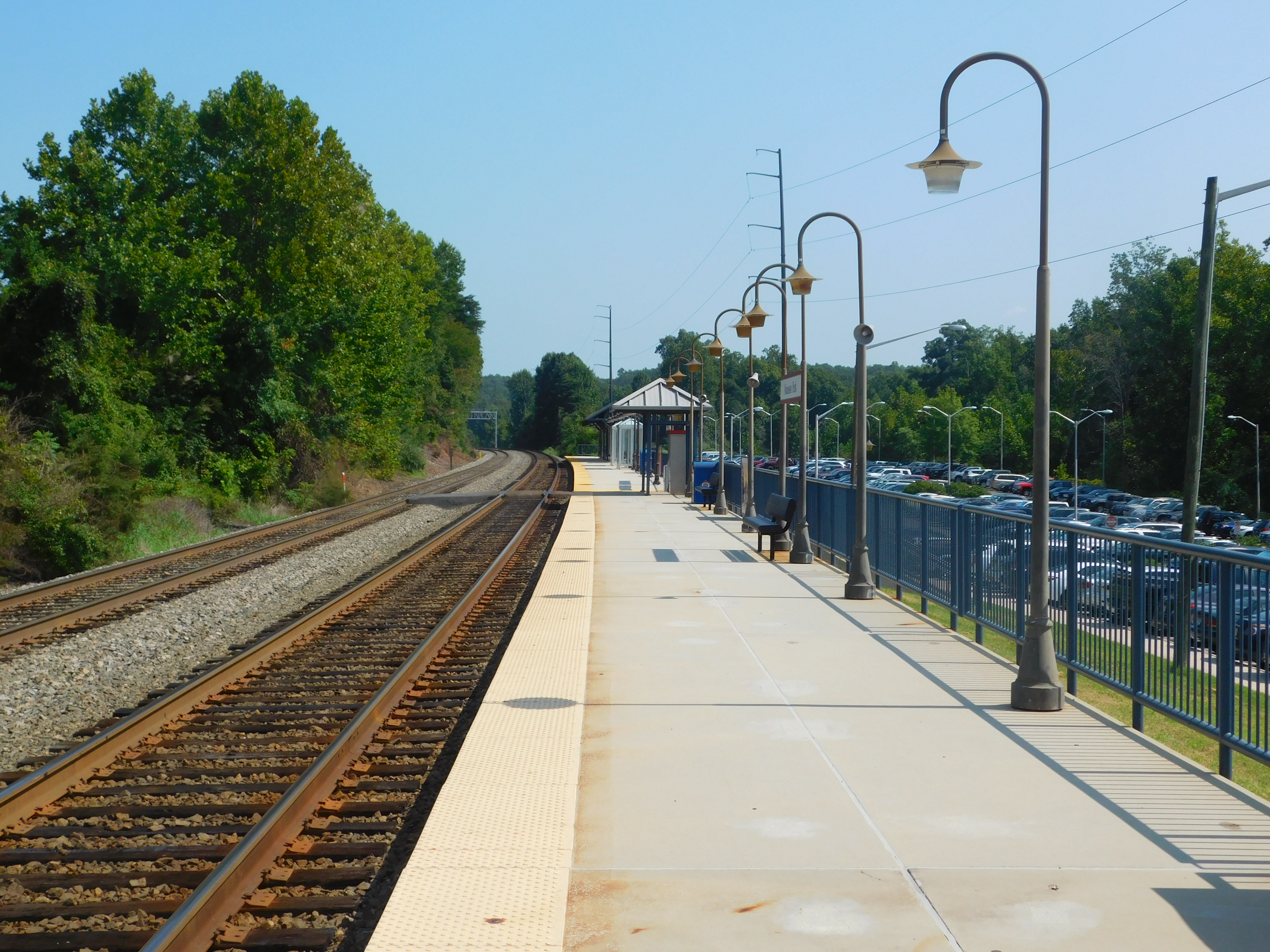
- Manassas Park station in August 2018

General information
- Location: 9300 Manassas Drive; Manassas, Virginia; United States
- Coordinates: 38°45′56″N 77°26′26″W
- Line: NS Washington District
- Platforms: 1 side platform
- Tracks: 2
- Connections: OmniRide Route 67

Construction
- Parking: 600-space parking lot, 700-space garage
- Cycle facilities: Bicycle racks
- Accessible: Yes

Other information
- Fare zone: 6

History
- Opened: 1992

Services
Preceding station	Virginia Railway Express	Following station
Manassas toward Broad Run	Manassas Line	Burke Centre toward Union Station
Special events service
Preceding station	Virginia Railway Express	Following station
Manassas Terminus	Manassas Line Special events only	Clifton toward Rolling Road
Location

Manassas Park station is a Virginia Railway Express station in Manassas Park, Virginia. The station serves the Virginia Railway Express Manassas Line, and shares the right-of-way with Amtrak's Cardinal and Crescent trains; however, no Amtrak trains stop. On October 21, 2025, a 700-space, $35.2 million parking garage opened, supplementing the existing 600-space parking lot.

Loudoun County Transit routes 182 and 582 served Manassas Park as part of a pilot project which started on October 20, 2025, and ended on September 30, 2026.
