= Clifton Historic District (Clifton, Virginia) =

Historic district in Virginia, United States

- U.S. National Register of Historic Places
- Virginia Landmarks Register
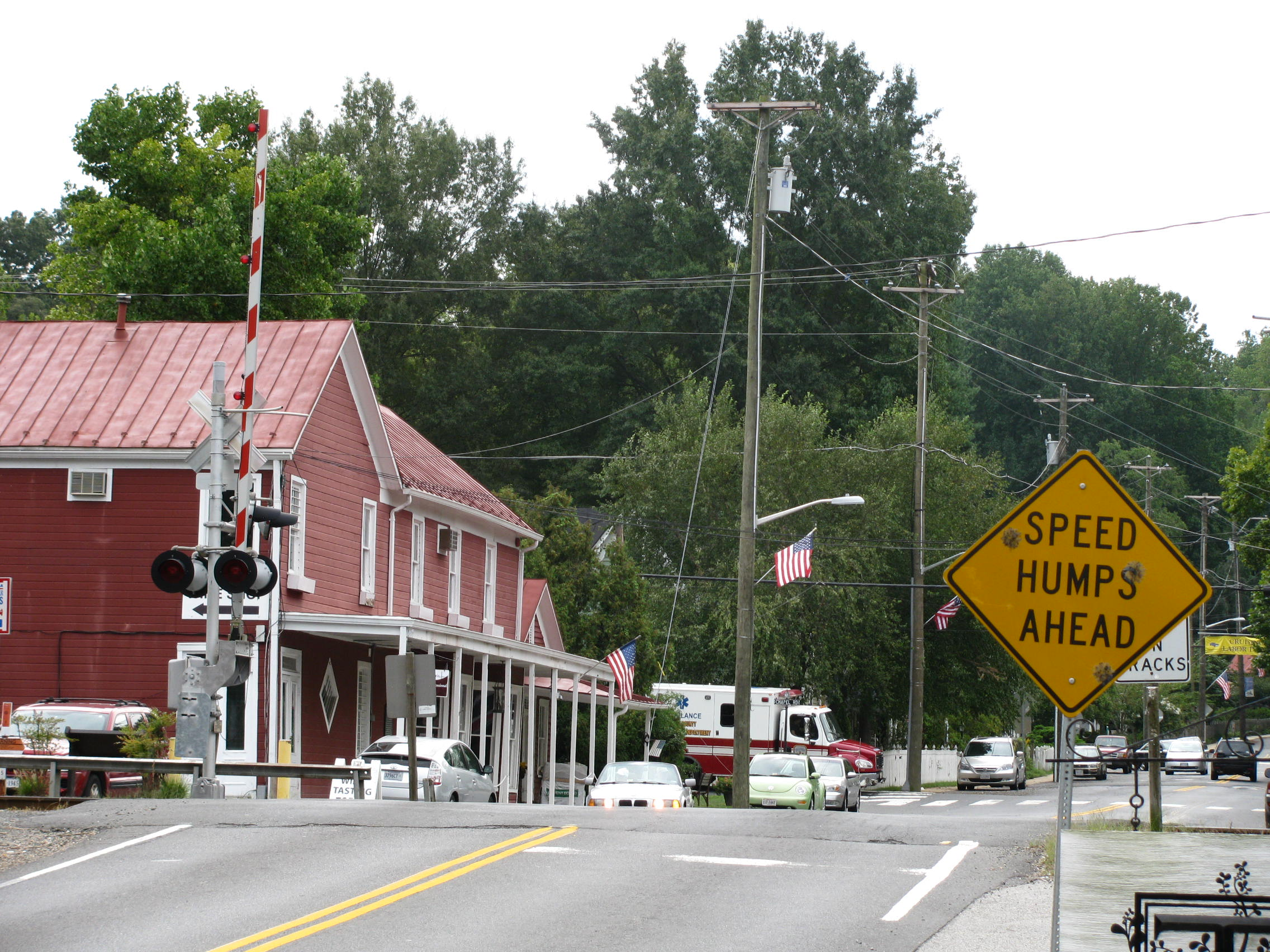
- Clifton Historic District, August 2012

- Location within Northern Virginia Location within Virginia Location within the United States
- Location: Roughly bounded by Popes Head Creek, Water St., Dell Ave., Chestnut & Chapel Rds., Clifton, Virginia
- Coordinates: 38°46′46″N 77°23′11″W
- Area: 42 acres (17 ha)
- Architectural style: Bungalow/craftsman, Second Empire, Neo-Gothic
- NRHP reference No.: 85001786
- VLR No.: 194-0003

Significant dates
- Added to NRHP: August 15, 1985
- Designated VLR: April 16, 1985

Clifton Historic District is a national historic district located at Clifton, Fairfax County, Virginia. It encompasses 62 contributing buildings, 1 contributing site, and 1 contributing object in the town of Clifton. They include 53 residences, 3 churches, 4 commercial buildings, and 2 local government buildings mostly built between 1880 and 1910. Notable buildings include Clifton Presbyterian Church (1871), Clifton Baptist Church (1912), Clifton Hotel (1869), the Mayhugh Tavern (c. 1870), the Ford House (c. 1880), the Cross House (c. 1886), Buckley Brothers Store (c. 1900), the M. M. Payne House (1903), "Red Gables" (1908), and Clifton’s oldest structure, the William E. Beckwith House (1771) .

It was listed on the National Register of Historic Places in 1985.
