= William E. Beckwith House =

- Location within Northern Virginia Location within Virginia Location within the United States
- Location: 12752 Chapel Street, Clifton, VA 20124, United States.
- Coordinates: 38°46′46″N 77°23′16″W
- Built: 1771
- Architectural style: Colonial

The William E. Beckwith House, also known as the Homestead, is a historic house in Clifton, Fairfax County, Virginia. This frame and weatherboard structure contains the town of Clifton's oldest remaining structure, a Colonial log house originally consisting of three rooms and a large stone hearth. It was part of the 200 acres left by planter William E. Beckwith (b. 1785 in Fairfax County) to the sixteen enslaved people of his plantation, all of whom were freed in his will in 1863.
