= Virginia Railway Express =

Commuter rail service in Virginia and Washington, D.C.

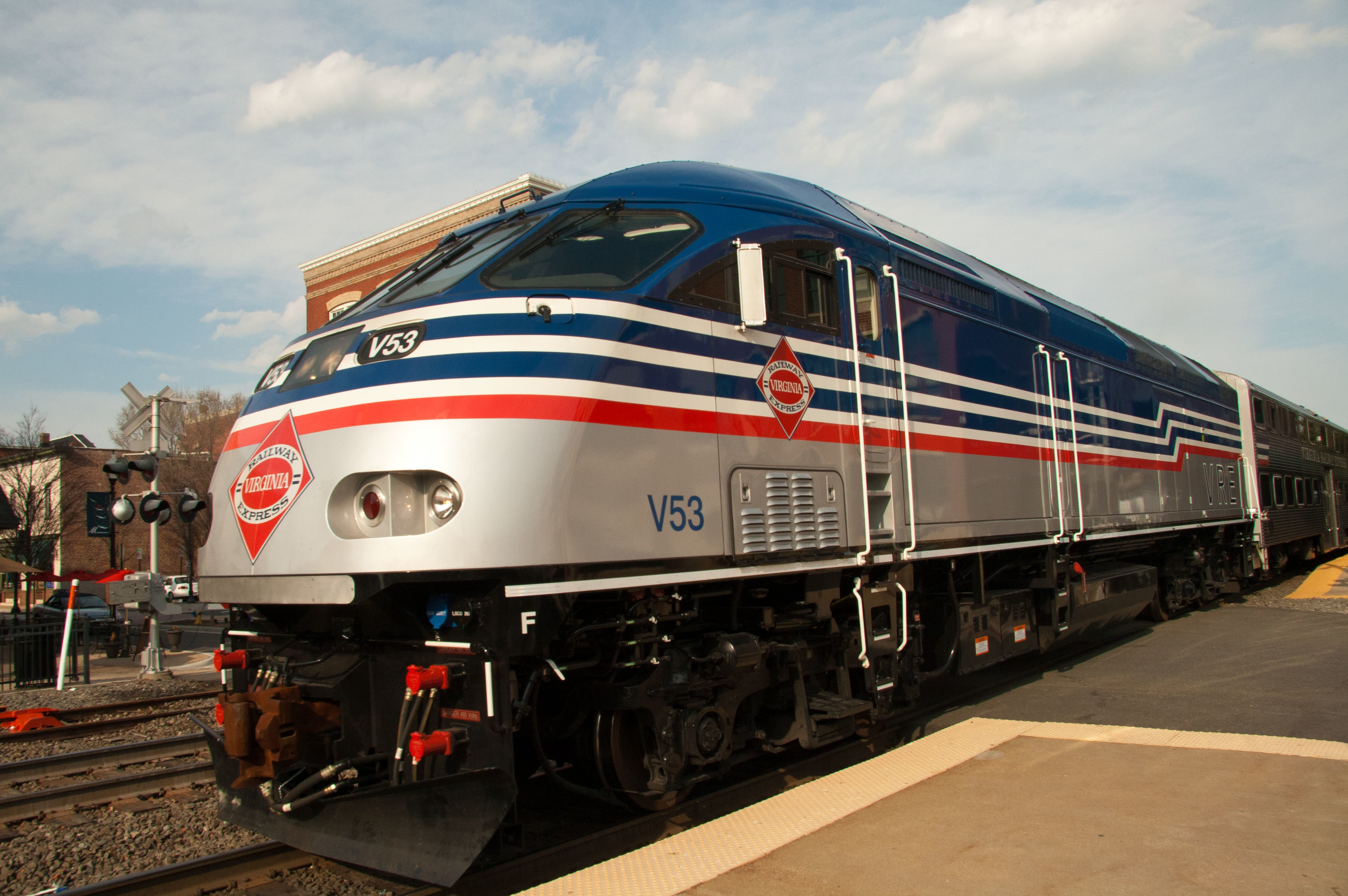
- A VRE train at Manassas station

Overview
- Owner: NVTC and PRTC
- Locale: Northern Virginia, District of Columbia, United States of America
- Transit type: Commuter rail
- Number of lines: 2
- Number of stations: 19 year-round, 1 seasonal, 1 planned
- Daily ridership: 8,500 (weekdays, Q2 2026)
- Annual ridership: 2,364,000 (2025)
- Website: vre.org

Operation
- Began operation: June 22, 1992
- Operator: Keolis (under contract)
- Reporting marks: VREX

Technical
- System length: 90 mi (145 km)
- Track gauge: 4 ft 8 1/2 in (1,435 mm) standard gauge
System map
Key

Virginia Railway Express (VRE) (reporting mark VREX) is a commuter rail service that connects outlying small cities of Northern Virginia to Washington Union Station in Washington, D.C. It operates two lines which run during weekday rush hour only: the Fredericksburg Line from Spotsylvania, Virginia, and the Manassas Line from Broad Run station in Bristow, Virginia. In 2025, the system had a ridership of 2,364,000, or about 8,500 per weekday as of the second quarter of 2026.

Service to Manassas began on June 22, 1992; the Fredericksburg service started on July 20, 1992.

VRE is owned by the Northern Virginia Transportation Commission (NVTC) and the Potomac and Rappahannock Transportation Commission (PRTC). The NVTC and PRTC are governmental entities that were created by the Commonwealth of Virginia. Local governments (such as counties and cities) within each commission's geographic area are members of each commission. The service will undergo expansion as the result of a December 19, 2019 deal brokered between former Virginia governor Ralph Northam and rail company CSX Transportation.

== History ==
=== 20th century ===
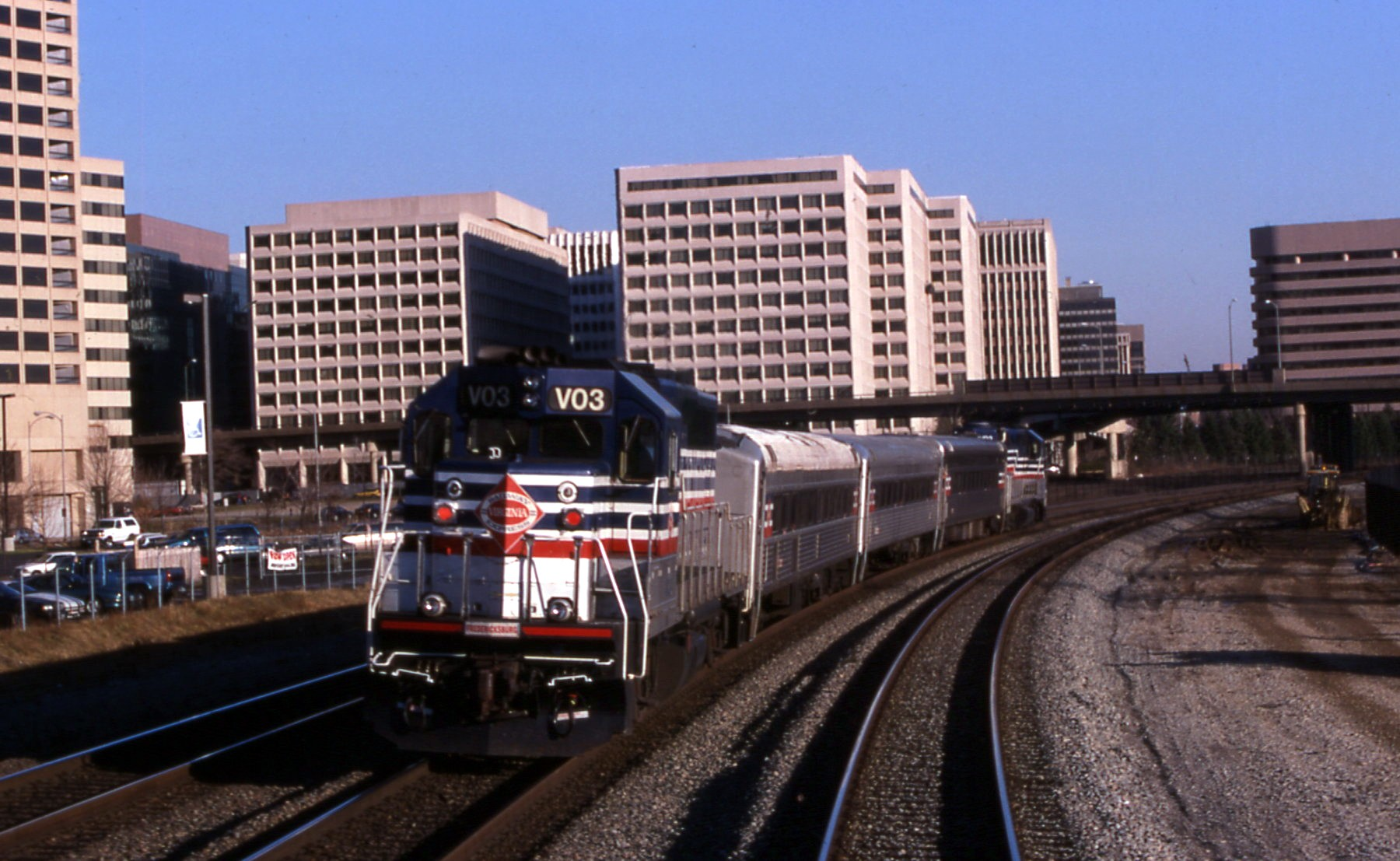
A Virginia Railway Express train going through Crystal City in 1999

Discussions about commuter rail service in Northern Virginia had occurred as early as 1964 at the Northern Virginia Transportation Commission, but died in the face of opposition by the freight railroads whose tracks offered ready access to core employment areas. The Metropolitan Washington Council of Governments eventually commissioned a regional feasibility study by R.L. Banks and Associates, Inc., and planning began in earnest for VRE in 1984. In the meantime, Washington Metro extended its service to much of the inner ring of Northern Virginia, including the independent cities of Alexandria, Fairfax and Falls Church and Arlington and Fairfax counties, which are members of the NVTC.

By 1986, it became apparent that Prince William and Stafford counties and the cities of Manassas and Manassas Park could not reach agreement on how to support VRE by joining NVTC, so the Potomac and Rappahannock Transportation Commission was created for them. Legislation established a 2% motor fuels tax to support VRE expenses and other transportation investments.

By 1988, NVTC and PRTC established a VRE Operations Board, consisting of three voting members plus alternates from each of the two commissions, plus a voting representative of the Commonwealth of Virginia (currently a representative of the Director of the Virginia Department of Rail and Public Transportation). The following year, the jurisdictions participating in the VRE project agreed to fund it according to a formula that weighted ridership by jurisdiction of residence with a factor of 90% and population with a factor of 10%. Arlington and Alexandria agreed to contribute to the project and have paid each year approximately what their formula share would be. The cities of Fredericksburg and Manassas Park joined PRTC in 1990 and signed the VRE Master Agreement and became participating jurisdictions in 1992.

=== 21st century ===
Spotsylvania County joined in February 2010 to allow construction of Spotsylvania station, which opened in November 2015. In June 2026, VRE purchased the Seminary Yard, a former freight yard in Alexandria.

== Operations ==
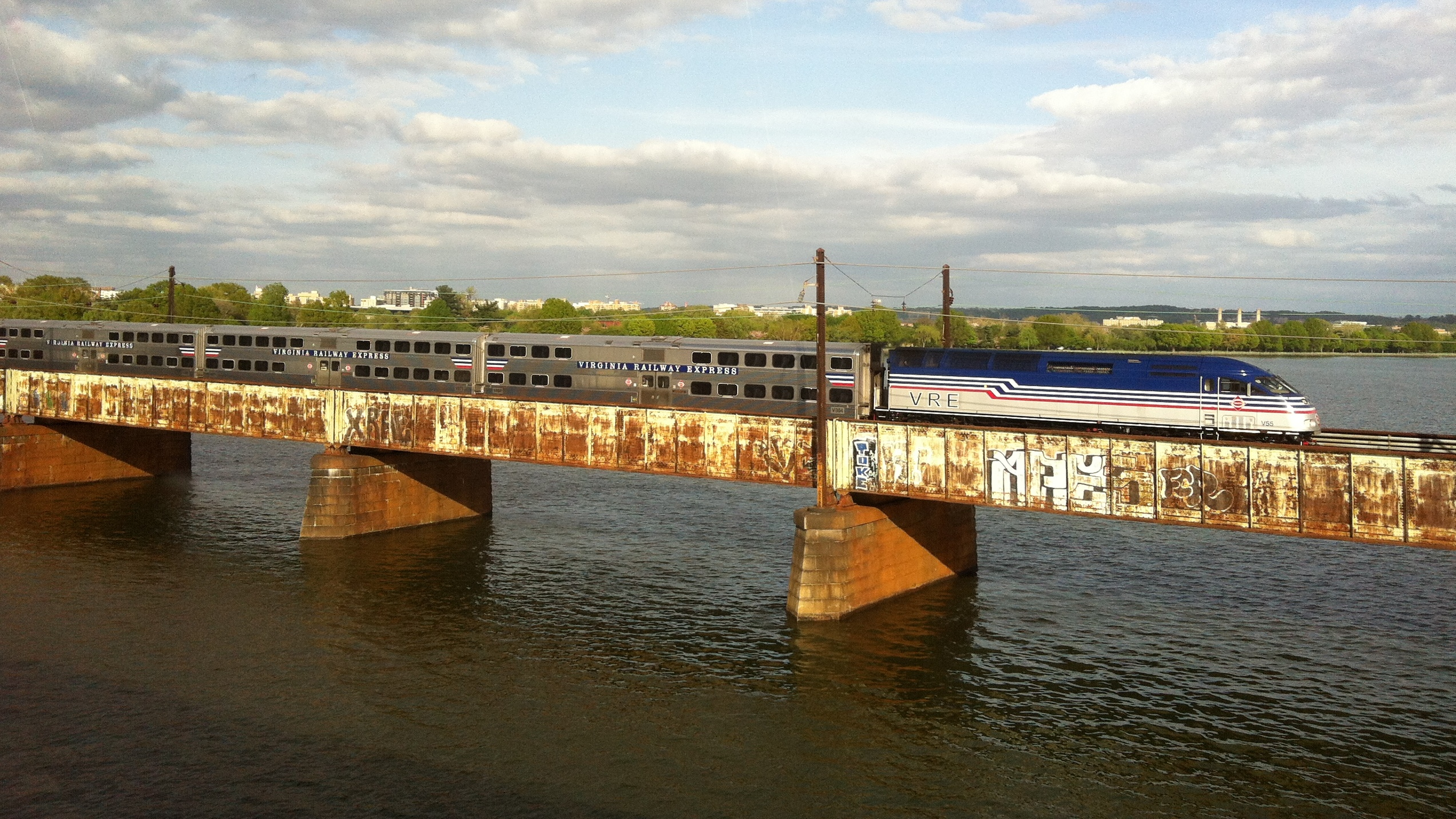
A VRE train crossing the Potomac River in 2013

Rail service operates Monday through Friday during rush hour in the peak direction, with trains traveling toward Washington in the morning and toward either Manassas or Fredericksburg in the afternoon. Service is suspended or reduced on some holidays.

Through a cross-honoring agreement, VRE and the MARC Train allow passengers to transfer to trains on the other system that are going in the opposite direction of the rush-hour commuters.

VRE operates on lines owned and maintained by Amtrak, Norfolk Southern, and CSX Transportation. In December 2019, the state of Virginia agreed to purchase large portions of the right-of-way and track on the CSX line, as well as the Long Bridge into the District of Columbia. The state will add parallel tracks and make other improvements for increased service on the VRE. Most of the Fredericksburg Line is on CSX tracks, while the portion of the Manassas Line west of Alexandria is mostly on Norfolk Southern tracks. Washington Union Station in Washington, D.C., the northern terminus for most VRE trains, is owned and operated by Amtrak, including the station tracks.

VRE's trains were initially run by Amtrak. On November 5, 2009, VRE awarded a five-year, $85 million operating and maintenance contract to Keolis. The change in operations took place on July 12, 2010, two weeks later than planned, to allow Keolis employees to learn how to run VRE trains.

Ridership on VRE increased an average of 13% each year from 2000 to 2005, but fell 2% in the fiscal year ending June 30, 2005. VRE said passengers affected by track maintenance and heat restrictions were taking other forms of transportation. The trend reversed in the summer of 2007, with ridership up nearly 2% in June and 4% in July compared with the corresponding months in 2006. As of October 2016, VRE transports an average of 19,400 passengers per day.

In 2015, VRE extended its contract with Keolis for five years, with an additional option for another five-year extension in 2020. That option was exercised in 2020, so Keolis will continue to provide operational and maintenance services through June 2025.

Starting in 2015, VRE began a study of extending service to Haymarket via a short branch line from the Manassas Line, but found that ridership would not sufficiently increase to justify the estimated $660 million cost and ended further consideration of the line.

== Lines and stations ==
VRE's fares are based on distance, with the 19 stations grouped into zones. The two lines diverge at Alexandria Union Station in Alexandria.

=== Manassas Line ===
The Manassas Line runs east–west along trackage owned by Norfolk Southern. Amtrak's Crescent and Cardinal, as well as Northeast Regional trains bound for Roanoke, also use this line. VRE studied an extension of the Manassas Line west to the communities of Gainesville and Haymarket, but chose instead to pursue added service on the existing line to Broad Run.

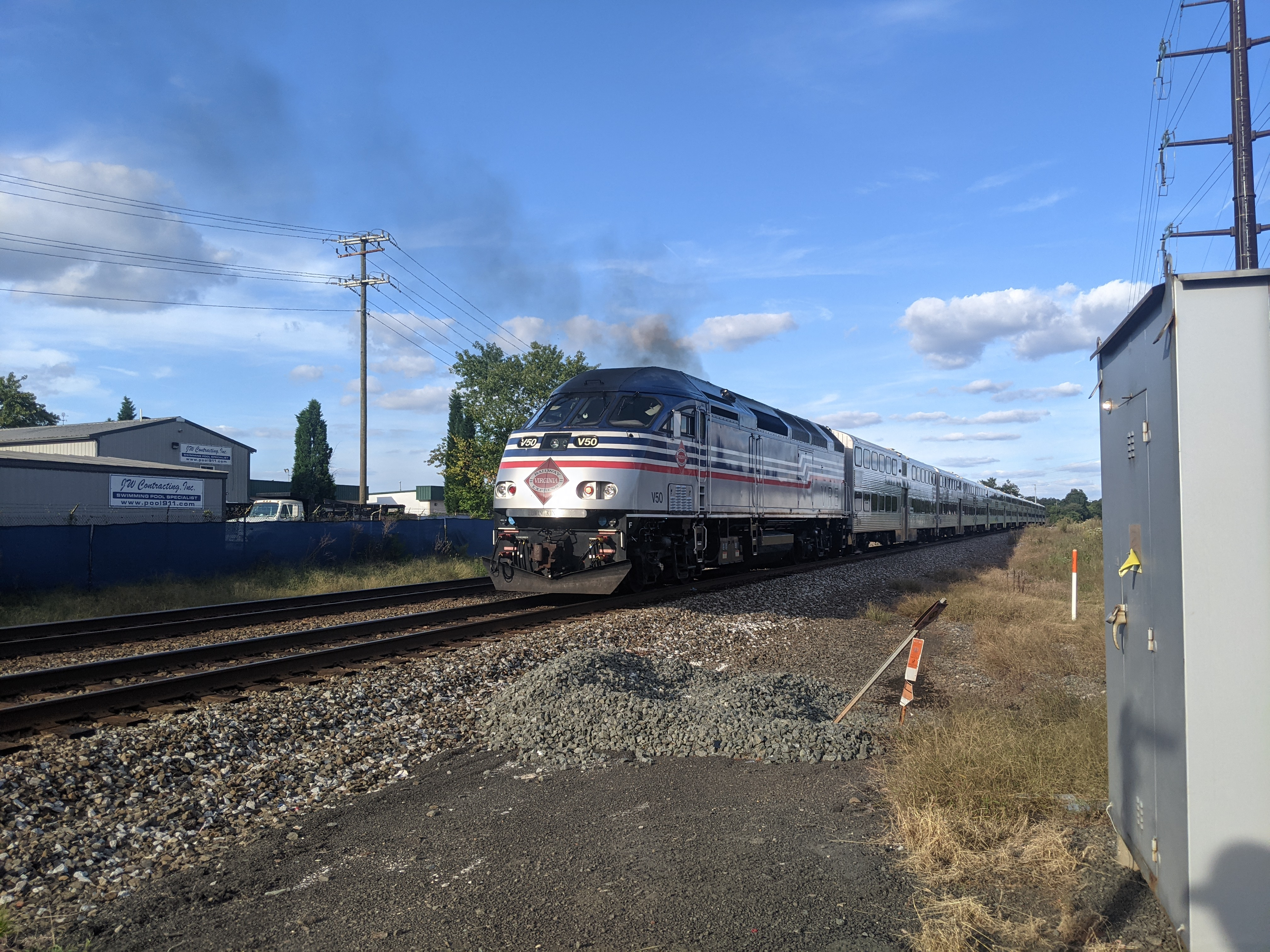
A reverse-peak VRE train to Washington, D.C.

Miles (km)	Fare Zone	State	Location	Station	Daily boardings (2012)	Connections
0 (0)	1	DC	Washington	Washington Union Station	1,135	Washington Metro, MARC, Amtrak
1.8 (2.9)	1	DC	Washington	L'Enfant	2,050	Washington Metro
4.3 (6.9)	2	VA	Crystal City	Crystal City	870	Washington Metro, Metroway
8.3 (13.4)	2	VA	Alexandria	Alexandria Union Station	425	Washington Metro, Amtrak
15.1 (24.3)	3	VA	Springfield	Backlick Road	170	
19.3 (31.1)	4	VA	Burke	Rolling Road	395	
21.6 (34.8)	4	VA	Burke Centre	Burke Centre	920	Amtrak
26.8 (43.1)		VA	Clifton	Clifton	880	Special events only
30.6 (49.2)	6	VA	Manassas Park	Manassas Park	880	
32.7 (52.6)	6	VA	Manassas	Manassas	880	Amtrak
35.9 (57.8)	6	VA	Bristow	Broad Run	1290	

=== Fredericksburg Line ===
The Fredericksburg Line runs north–south along trackage that was once part of the Richmond, Fredericksburg & Potomac Railroad and is now part of CSX. Amtrak service to Richmond, Virginia, and points south (the Silver Service, Palmetto, Carolinian, and Northeast Regional runs to Hampton Roads) also uses this line. An extension to Spotsylvania opened in November 2015.

Miles (km)	Fare Zone	State	Location	Station	Daily boardings (2012)	Connections
0 (0)	1	DC	Washington, D.C.	Washington Union Station	930	Washington Metro, MARC, Amtrak
1.8 (2.9)	1	DC	Washington, D.C.	L'Enfant	1,675	Washington Metro
4.3 (6.9)	2	VA	Crystal City	Crystal City	930	Washington Metro, Metroway
8.3 (13.4)	2	VA	Alexandria	Alexandria Union Station	630	Washington Metro, Amtrak
15.7 (25.3)	3	VA	Springfield	Franconia–Springfield	290	Washington Metro
20.2 (32.5)	4	VA	Lorton	Lorton	510	
24.6 (39.6)	5	VA	Woodbridge	Woodbridge	455	Amtrak
27.9 (44.9)	5	VA	Featherstone	Rippon	545	
30.6 mi (49.2 km)		VA	Dumfries	Potomac Shores (under development)		
34.8 (56.0)	6	VA	Quantico	Quantico	540	Amtrak
45.7 (73.5)	8	VA	Brooke	Brooke	630	
50.2 (80.8)	8	VA	Leeland	Leeland Road	1100	
54.2 (87.2)	9	VA	Fredericksburg	Fredericksburg	1770	Amtrak
60.3 (97.0)	9	VA	Olive	Spotsylvania	Opened in 2015	

== Rolling stock ==
Virginia Railway Express commenced operations in 1992 with ten EMD RP39-2C diesel locomotives, 38 Mafersa coaches, and 21 remanufactured Budd Rail Diesel Cars from the MBTA. Morrison-Knudsen rebuilt the locomotives from EMD GP40s at a total cost of $5.9 million. Mafersa built the coaches new at $24.7 million, or $600,000–$700,000 per car. During Summer 1998, SEPTA leased some VRE Boisie Budds for the Regional Rail services. VRE sold 33 of the Mafersa coaches to the Connecticut Department of Transportation in 2004 for its Shore Line East service. QIT-Fer et Titane, a Quebec mining company, purchased the remaining five cars in 2008.

VRE operated 13 Kawasaki bi-level cars between 1999 and 2008, after which they were sold to MARC (these cars were originally procured as an option on MARC's larger order). Starting in 2001, VRE also operated a number of second-hand Pullman-Standard gallery cars from Metra in Chicago. These were all replaced by new Sumitomo/Nippon Sharyo gallery cars from 2006 to 2017 as some cars returned to Metra and others went to the North Carolina Transportation Museum in Spencer, North Carolina.

As of 2017, trains comprise one and on some occasions two MPI MP36PH-3C locomotives pulling usually at least four Sumitomo/Nippon Sharyo gallery cars to a maximum of eight.

=== Locomotive fleet ===
Numbers	Status	Model	Notes	Photo
V1–V10	retired	EMD RP39-2C	Rebuilt from original units by Morrison-Knudsen. All sold to other operators. Lack the flared radiators of VRE's GP40s.	
V20–V21	retired	EMD RP40-2C	Rebuilt from original units by Morrison-Knudsen. V20 sold to Royal Gorge Route Railroad and renumbered 728. V21 sold to the US Army.	
V22–V24	retired	EMD GP40H-2	V22 and V24 sold to US Army. V23 sold to other another operator.	
V30–V36	retired	EMD F40PH-2	All were former Amtrak units.: V30 owned by Amtrak (AMTK 403). When lease was up, it was returned to Amtrak and received its original number.; V31 (ex-AMTK 392) sold to AMT in 2010 and renumbered 310. Later sold to SLC and leased to MBTA. Sold to LTEX in 2017, and currently leased to the Steam Railroading Institute.; V32 (ex-AMTK 364) sold to Metra renumbered 217.; V33 (ex-AMTK 365) sold to AMT as 330, then sold to LTEX and leased to MBTA. Sold to Grand Canyon Railway in 2023 as 365.; V34-V36 were returned to Rail World, a previous owner, in 2012: V34 (ex-AMTK 294) sold to LTEX in 2015, sold to Rolling Stock Solutions as RSTX 1002 and rebuilt to F40PH-4C for MBTA in 2025.; V35 (ex-AMTK 311) sold to Webb Rail, then repainted into Amtrak Phase III colors.; V36 (ex-AMTK 316) sold to LTEX in 2015, sold to Rolling Stock Solutions as RSTX 1001 and rebuilt to F40PH-4C for MBTA in 2025.	
V50–V69	active	MPI MP36PH-3C	Total order of 20. The first unit was delivered in June 2010, entered service in August 2010, and all units are currently in service. These are the first new locomotives that VRE purchased. To be overhauled within the next 5 years.	

VRE also operated a pair of EMD F59PHI locomotives and 18 high capacity Bombardier BiLevel cars leased from Sound Transit from 2002 to 2008; they have been returned to Sounder and replaced by locomotives V50–V69 and the Sumitomo bi-level cars.

=== Coach fleet ===
Numbers	Years Built	Status	Builder	Model	Seats
405, 408, 412, 413, 415*	1956	retired	Pullman-Standard	Gallery I coach	123
421-430*	1956	retired	Pullman-Standard	Gallery II coach	123
431-458*	1960-66	retired	Pullman-Standard	Gallery III coach	123
710–730*	2006–08	active	Sumitomo / Nippon Sharyo	Gallery IV cab car	123
800–819*, 850–869, 870–879	2007–09	active	Sumitomo / Nippon Sharyo	Gallery IV trailer car	132* / 144
820–848*^{†}	2014	active	Sumitomo / Nippon Sharyo	Gallery IV trailer car	132

* with restroom

== Safety and accidents ==
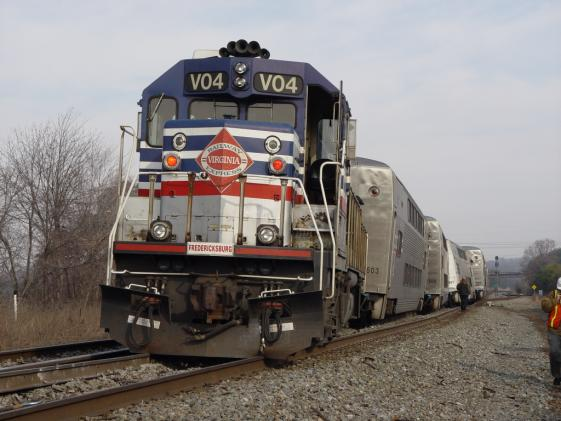
The VRE derailment on January 5, 2006

On January 5, 2006, at 6:45 am, Fredericksburg line train No. 304 bound for Washington, D.C., derailed at Possum Point, just north of Quantico. Four people, including the assistant conductor, suffered minor injuries. The National Transportation Safety Board determined that the derailment was intimately related to CSX's maintenance practices: a switch point had been repeatedly identified as deteriorating, but CSX failed to replace it. Eventually, the excessively worn and chipped point caused the lead truck of a passenger car to derail—the fourth car on train 304.

On October 3, 2012, Virginia Governor Bob McDonnell launched a review of "multiple internal control issues", including reports of corruption and favoritism, that "call into question the management of the Virginia Railway Express". For example, VRE managers disregarded warnings by a former employee, later borne out, that trains would hit the new Broad Run platform.

== See also ==
- List of United States railroads
- List of Washington, D.C., railroads
