= Rolling Road station =

Rail station in Burke, Virginia, US

Rolling Road
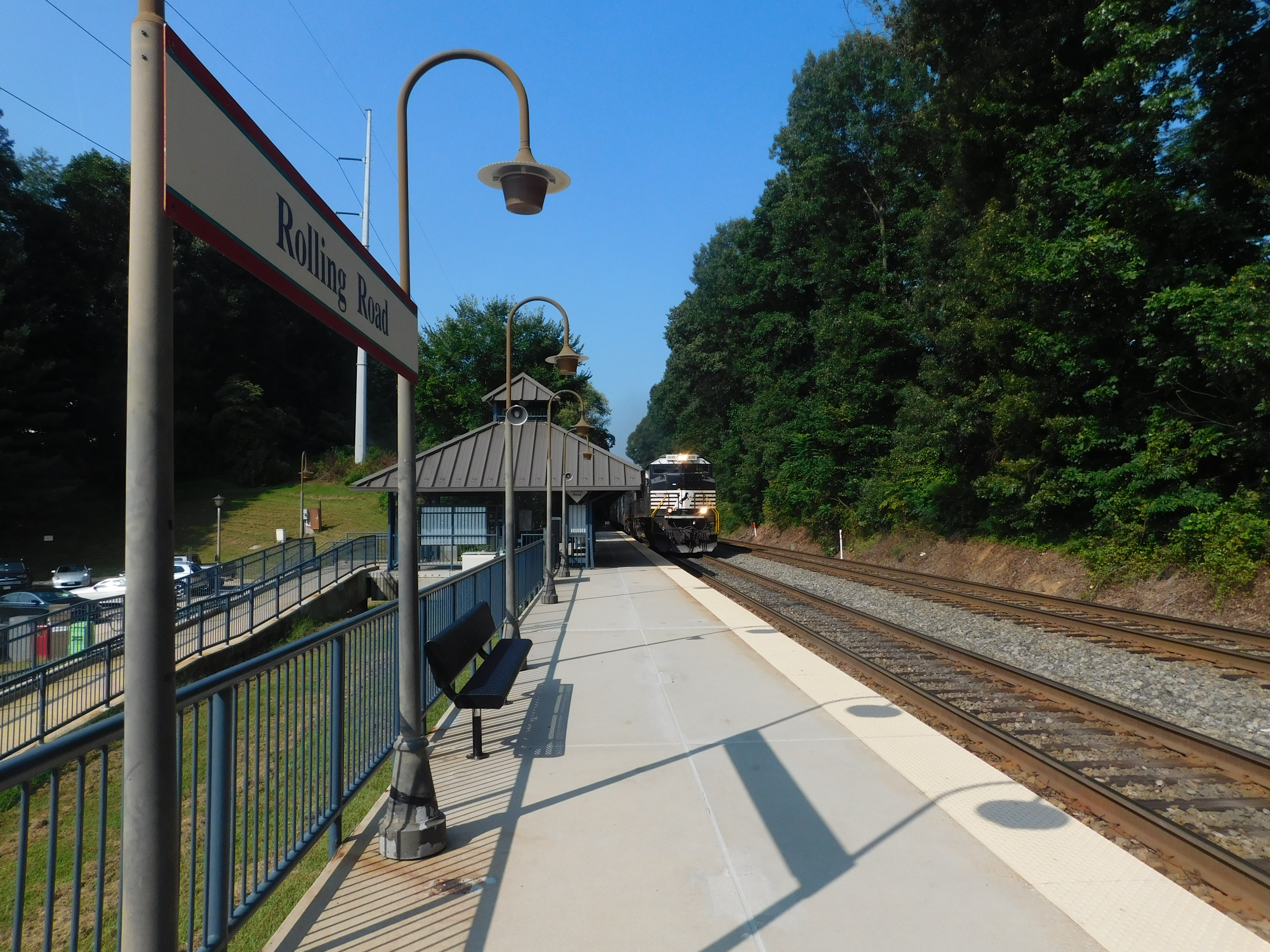
- Rolling Road station in August 2018 with a Norfolk Southern Railway freight approaching.

General information
- Location: 9016 Burke Road; Burke, Virginia; United States
- Coordinates: 38°47′41″N 77°15′30″W
- Line: NS Washington District
- Platforms: 1 side platform
- Tracks: 2

Construction
- Parking: 368 spaces
- Cycle facilities: Bicycle racks
- Accessible: Yes

Other information
- Fare zone: 4

History
- Opened: 1992

Services
Preceding station	Virginia Railway Express	Following station
Burke Centre toward Broad Run	Manassas Line	Backlick Road toward Union Station
Special events service
Preceding station	Virginia Railway Express	Following station
Burke Centre toward Manassas	Manassas Line Special events only	Terminus
Location

Rolling Road station is a Virginia Railway Express station in Burke, Virginia. The station is served by the Virginia Railway Express Manassas Line. Amtrak Cardinal and Crescent trains; also use the line but do not stop at Rolling Road.

The station platform was originally 380 feet (120 m) long and only able to accommodate five-car trains. A contractor was selected for a $5 million, 290-foot (88 m) extension of the platform in October 2020. Work began in early 2021 and was completed in 2022. A ribbon cutting ceremony was held on September 28, 2022.
