= Burke Centre station =

Rail station in Burke, Virginia

Burke Centre
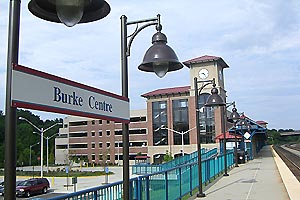
- Burke Centre station in August 2010

General information
- Location: 10399 Premier Court; Burke, Virginia; United States
- Coordinates: 38°47′51″N 77°17′54″W
- Line: NS Washington District
- Platforms: 1 side platform
- Tracks: 2
- Bus stands: 3
- Connections: Fairfax Connector: 495

Construction
- Parking: 1,516 spaces
- Accessible: Yes

Other information
- Station code: Amtrak: BCV
- Fare zone: 4 (VRE)

History
- Opened: June 22, 1992
- Rebuilt: 2006–2008

Passengers
- FY 2025: 14,721 (Amtrak)

Services
Preceding station	Amtrak	Following station
Manassas toward Roanoke	Northeast Regional	Alexandria toward Boston South or Springfield
Cardinal does not stop here
Crescent does not stop here
Preceding station	Virginia Railway Express	Following station
Manassas Park toward Broad Run	Manassas Line	Rolling Road toward Union Station
Special events service
Preceding station	Virginia Railway Express	Following station
Clifton toward Manassas	Manassas Line Special events only	Rolling Road Terminus
Location

Burke Centre station is a railway station in Burke Centre, Burke, Fairfax County, Virginia. It is served by the Virginia Railway Express Manassas Line and a once daily Amtrak Northeast Regional round trip.

== History ==
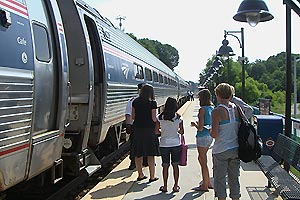
A Northeast Regional train at Burke Centre station in August 2010

The station opened along with the Manassas Line on June 22, 1992. A large parking garage and bus stands were added in mid-2008 as a $28 million project.

On October 1, 2009, one Amtrak Northeast Regional round trip was extended to Lynchburg. As with Northeast Regional trains on the Fredericksburg Line, trains would stop for VRE passengers under a cross-honoring agreement between Amtrak and VRE. On January 18, 2010, Burke Centre became a full Amtrak stop, with passengers allowed to book travel to and from the station in both directions. Amtrak Cardinal and Crescent trains pass through but do not stop.
