= Manassas Line =

Commuter rail service in Northern Virginia

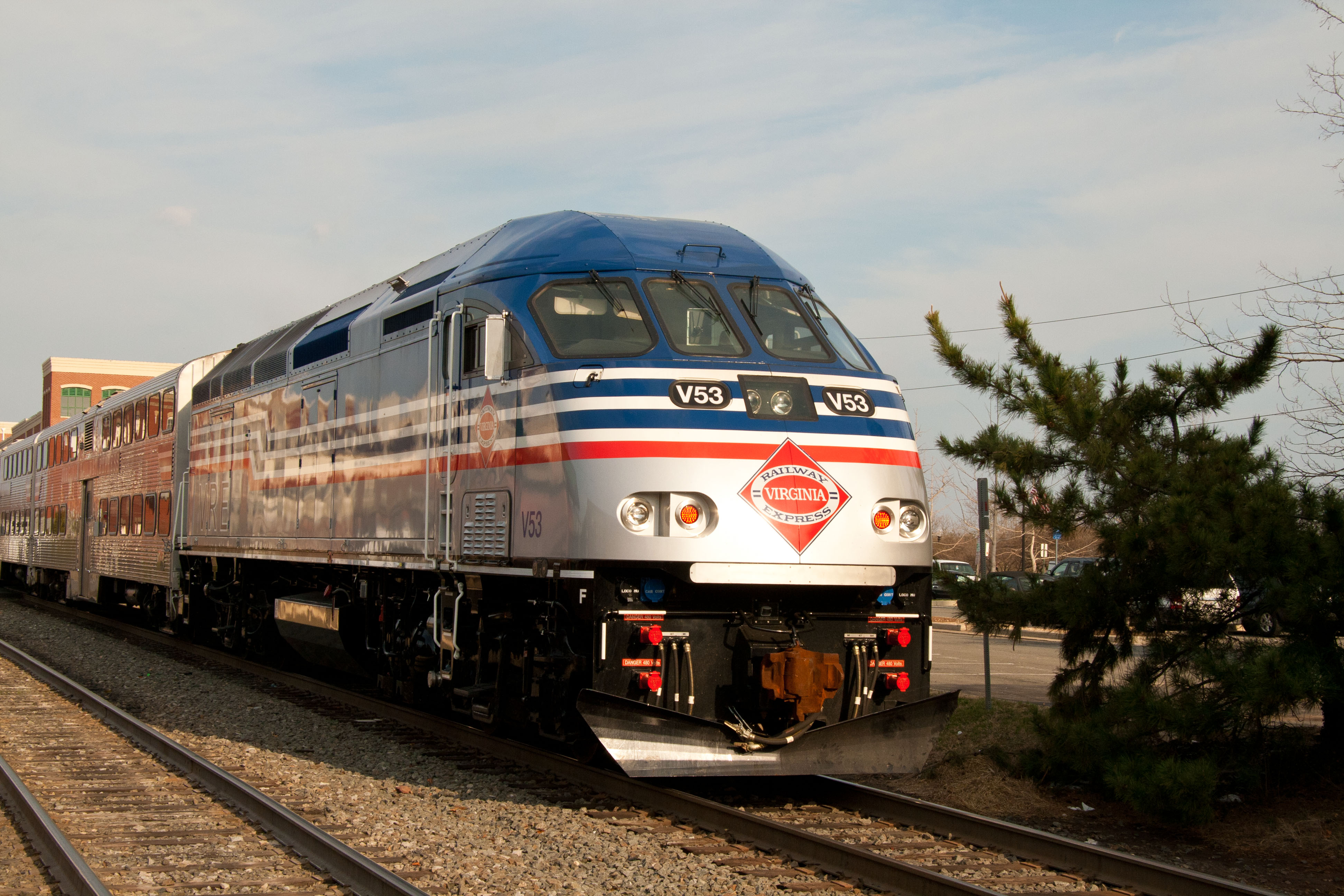
- Manassas Line train at Manassas station in 2011

Overview
- Status: Operating
- Owner: Virginia Passenger Rail Authority, CSX Transportation
- Locale: Washington, D.C., Fairfax County, Virginia, Prince William County, Virginia
- Termini: Washington Union Station; Broad Run station
- Stations: 10

Service
- Type: Commuter rail
- System: Virginia Railway Express
- Train number: 321–338
- Operator: Virginia Railway Express
- Daily ridership: 5,062 boardings (April 2025)

History
- Opened: June 22, 1992

Technical
- Line length: 35 miles (56 km)
- Track gauge: 4 ft 8 1/2 in (1,435 mm)
- Operating speed: 79 miles per hour (127 km/h) maximum
Route map
Manassas Line highlighted in blue

The Manassas Line is a Virginia Railway Express commuter rail service that extends from Washington, D.C., to Bristow, Virginia. The first of VRE's two lines, with service beginning on June 22, 1992, the line operates on tracks owned by CSX Transportation (the RF&P Subdivision) and Virginia Passenger Rail Authority.

The line got around 5,062 boardings per day in April 2025.

== History ==
The line south of Alexandria, Virginia, was once owned by Southern Railway, whose Crescent train stopped at the line's Alexandria and Manassas stations. When U.S. intercity passenger service was taken over by Amtrak, the new railroad continued the Crescent service between New Orleans and New York City.

In 1984, planning began for a commuter rail service for the area. Eight years later, after many new stations were constructed, Virginia Railway Express began operating trains on the line on June 22, 1992.

In 2009, Amtrak extended its Northeast Regional service south to Lynchburg, bringing more trains to Manassas and Burke Centre.

In 2017, VRE began a $2.8 million study of expansion to the Broad Run station and layover facility that would allow additional Manassas Line service.

The Virginia Passenger Rail Authority purchased the line from with Norfolk Southern between Broad Run and Alexandria used by VRE in 2024.

== Stations list ==
| State | Location | Station | Connections |
|---|---|---|---|
| DC | Washington | Union Station | Amtrak: Acela, Cardinal, Carolinian, Crescent, Floridian, Northeast Regional, Palmetto, Silver Meteor, Vermonter, Thruway Bus to Charlottesville, Virginia; MARC: ■ Brunswick Line, ■ Camden Line, ■ Penn Line; VRE: ■ Fredericksburg Line; Metrorail: Metrobus, LC Transit, OmniRide, MTA Commuter Bus |
| DC | Washington | L'Enfant | VRE: ■ Fredericksburg Line; Metrorail: Metrobus, LC Transit, OmniRide, MTA Commuter Bus |
| VA | Arlington | Crystal City | VRE: ■ Fredericksburg Line; Metrorail: Metroway; Metrobus, ART, Fairfax Connector, LC Transit, OmniRide |
| VA | Alexandria | Alexandria | Amtrak: Cardinal, Carolinian, Crescent, Floridian, Northeast Regional, Palmetto, Silver Meteor; VRE: ■ Fredericksburg Line; Metrorail: Metrobus, DASH |
| VA | Springfield | Backlick Road | Fairfax Connector |
| VA | Burke | Rolling Road | |
| VA | Burke | Burke Centre | Amtrak: Northeast Regional; Fairfax Connector |
| VA | Manassas Park | Manassas Park | OmniRide |
| VA | Manassas | Manassas | Amtrak: Cardinal, Crescent, Northeast Regional; OmniRide, LC Transit |
| VA | Bristow | Broad Run | Washington Manassas Airport |
