= Manassas station =

Train station in Manassas, Virginia, US

Manassas
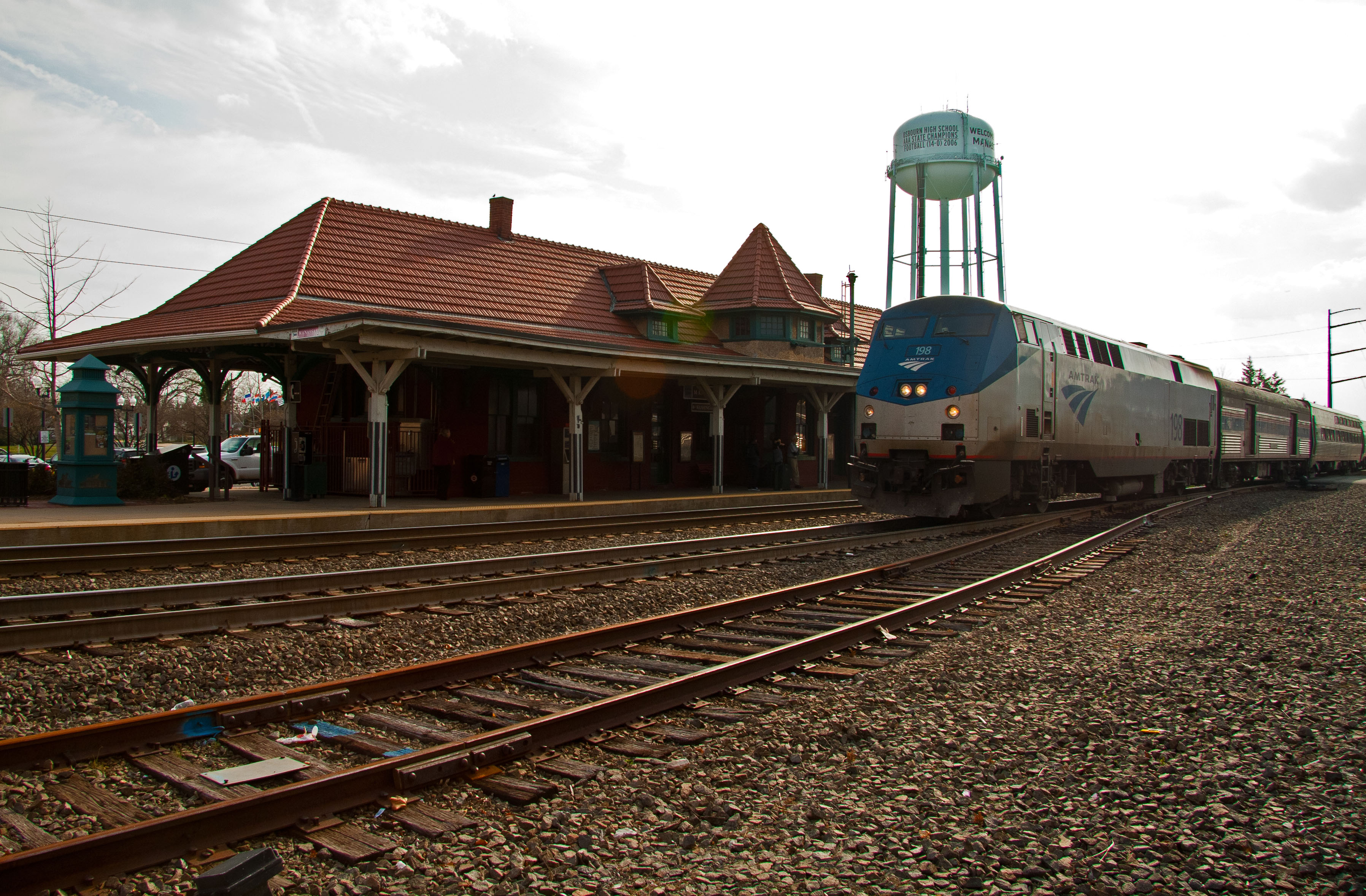
- The Cardinal arriving at Manassas in 2011

General information
- Location: 9500 West Street; Manassas, Virginia; United States
- Coordinates: 38.7501°N 77.4728°W
- Owner: City of Manassas
- Line: NS Washington District
- Platforms: 2 side platforms
- Tracks: 2
- Connections: OmniRide: 67, 96.

Construction
- Cycle facilities: Racks
- Accessible: Yes

Other information
- Station code: Amtrak: MSS
- Fare zone: 6 (VRE)

History
- Opened: 1914
- Rebuilt: 1997

Passengers
- FY 2025: 52,758 (Amtrak)

Services
| Preceding station | Amtrak | Following station |
|---|---|---|
| Culpeper toward Chicago | Cardinal | Alexandria toward New York |
| Culpeper toward New Orleans | Crescent | Alexandria toward New York |
| Culpeper toward Roanoke | Northeast Regional | Burke Centre toward Boston South or Springfield |
| Preceding station | Virginia Railway Express | Following station |
| Broad Run Terminus | Manassas Line | Manassas Park toward Union Station |
Former services
| Preceding station | Amtrak | Following station |
|---|---|---|
| Culpeper toward Chicago | James Whitcomb Riley | Alexandria toward Washington, D.C. or Newport News |
| Preceding station | Southern Railway | Following station |
| Culpeper toward Birmingham | Main Line | Alexandria toward Washington, D.C. |
| Preceding station | Chesapeake and Ohio Railway | Following station |
| Culpeper toward Cincinnati | Main Line | Alexandria toward Washington, D.C. or Phoebus |
Location

Manassas station is a train station in the city of Manassas, Virginia, United States. The station is served by Virginia Railway Express Manassas Line commuter trains and Amtrak Cardinal, Crescent and Northeast Regional intercity trains.

== History ==
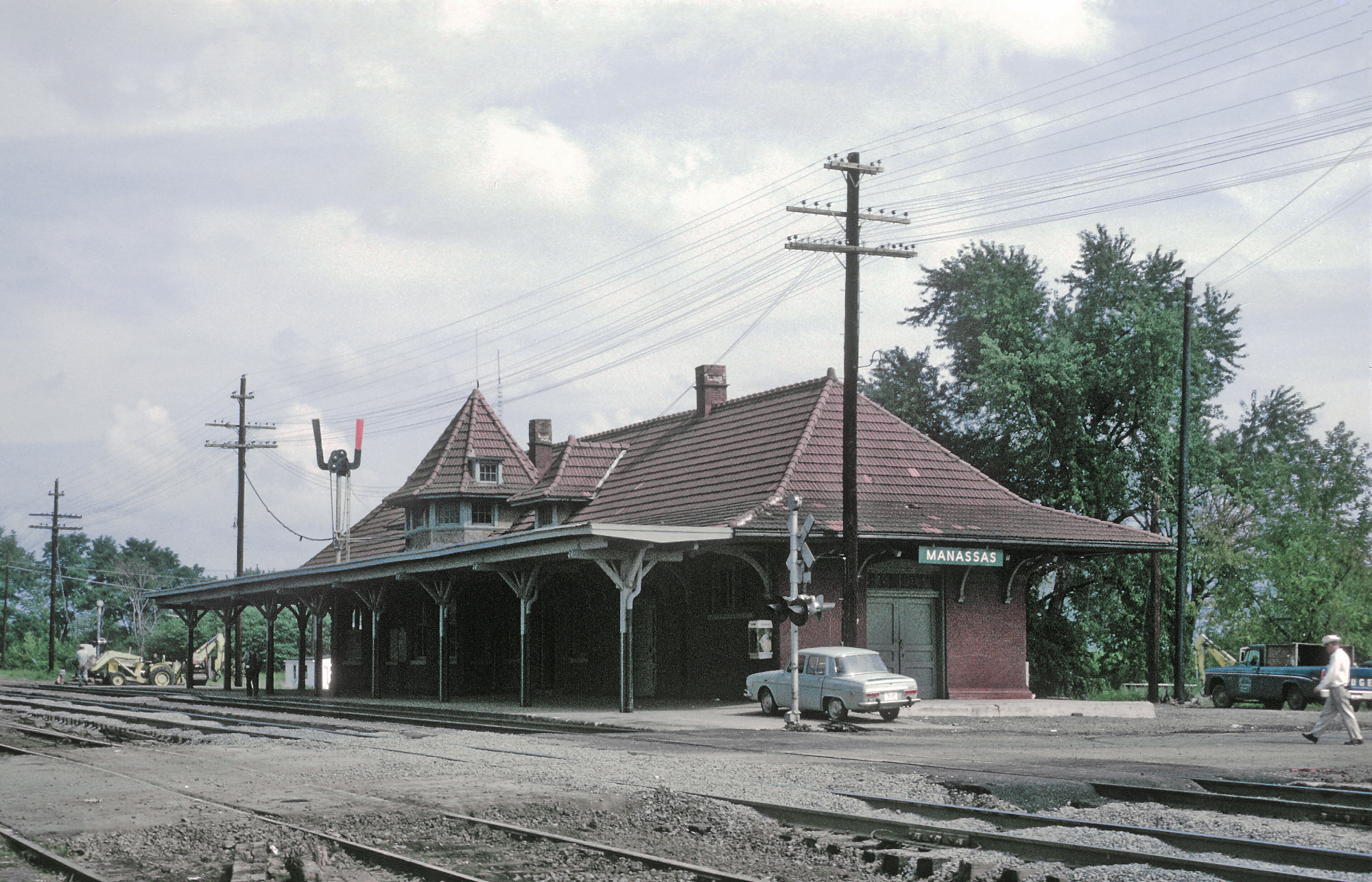
Manassas station in 1969

The first Manassas station was a small log building where the Orange and Alexandria Railroad and the Manassas Gap Railroad intersected. In 1904, the building was replaced with a brick passenger station. This station caught fire on June 25, 1914 and was destroyed.

The present station was constructed in October 1914 by the Southern Railway. The city bought the depot from Norfolk Southern Railway in the 1990s and renovated it under the direction of The Manassas Museum System. Workers restored the original 1914 paint colors, repointed brick, laid new plaster, overhauled mechanical systems and installed reproductions of original doors and light fixtures. A tile roof similar to the original was also installed. The $575,000 project was completed in 1997. Today the depot has a waiting room and also houses a tourist information center and the James & Marion Payne Memorial Railroad Exhibition Gallery.

The station appears on the cover of the 1972 self-titled double album by Manassas. The image depicts musicians Chris Hillman and Stephen Stills standing on the north end of the then-Southern Railway depot.
