= NOVA Parks =

Regional park authority in Virginia

NOVA Parks (formerly named Northern Virginia Regional Park Authority) is an inter-jurisdictional organization that owns and operates more than 10,000 acres of woodlands, streams, parks, trails, nature reserves, countryside and historic sites in Northern Virginia in the United States. The Authority was organized in 1959. NOVA Parks presently operates 34 regional parks.

A 12-member policy-making Board governs NOVA Parks. The city council or county board of each member jurisdiction appoints two representatives to the Board. Three counties (Arlington, Fairfax, and Loudoun) and three cities (Alexandria, Falls Church and Fairfax) currently have representation on the Board.

== History ==
NOVA Parks was founded in 1959, when Arlington and Fairfax Counties and the City of Falls Church decided to create an agency to protect the drinking water sources of the area, as well to provide passive recreation.

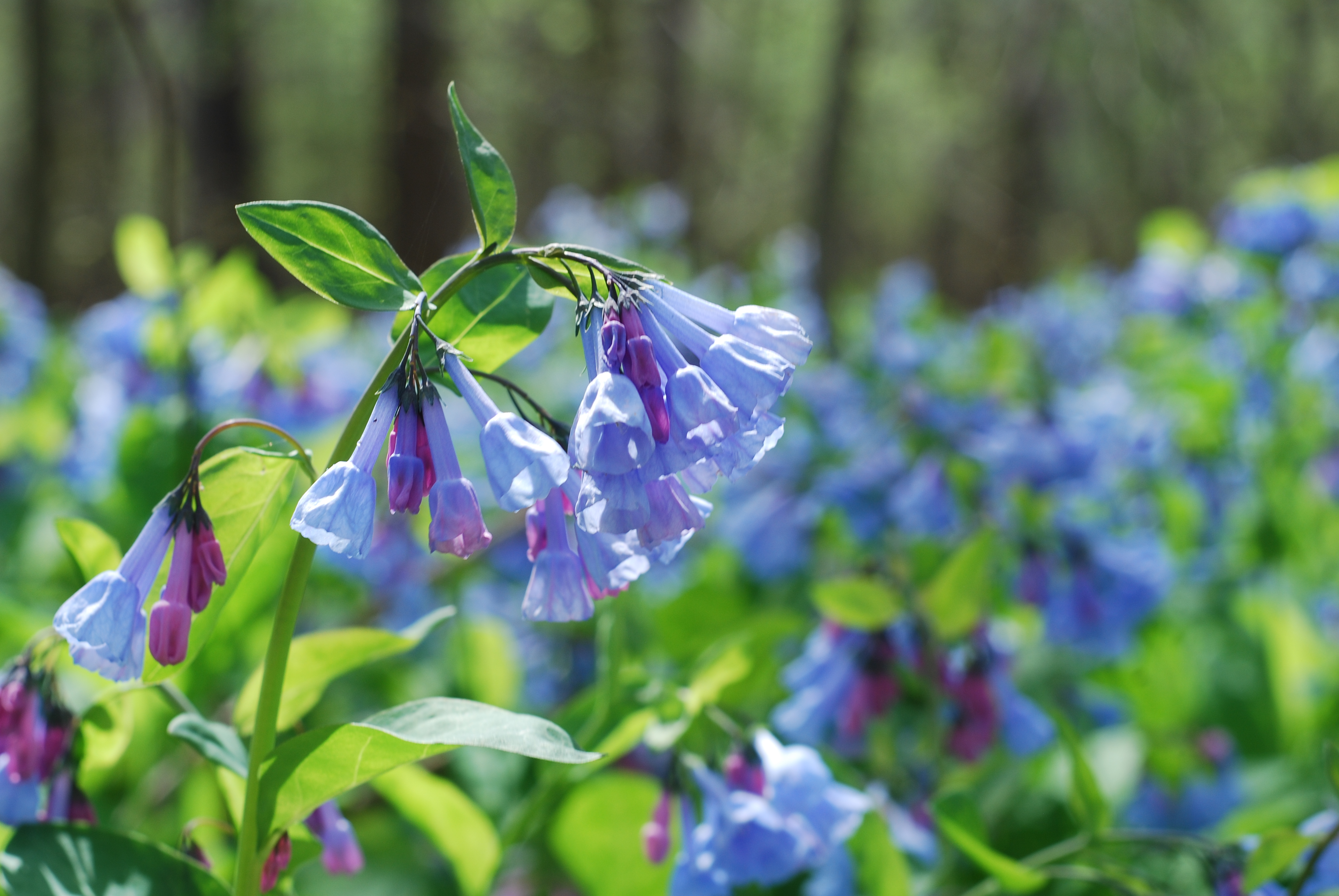
Bluebells blooming in Bull Run Park

NOVA Parks purchased its first parkland shortly thereafter in Centreville, VA from Gardiner Means and his wife Caroline F. Ware, in what would become Bull Run Regional Park. The park is well-known for the Virginia bluebells that grow along Bull Run and is a destination in the early spring for visitors to view their blooming. The pair later donated their farm home in Vienna, VA, which would eventually become Meadowlark Botanical Gardens.

Within its first decade of existence, NOVA Parks conserved over 3,000 acres (1,200 ha). In the ten years that followed, that number was increased to approximately 8,000 acres (3,200 ha).

NOVA Parks then added sites in Clifton, VA, the City of Fairfax, VA, Fairfax County, Arlington and Alexandria, VA in the 1960s. The agency welcomed Loudoun County, VA in the 1970s. The latter arrangement would lead to the addition of several key sites, including what would become Algonkian Regional Park on the Potomac River, as well as Red Rock Overlook, Temple Hall Farm and Ball's Bluff Battlefield and National Cemetery.

NOVA Parks continued their growth through the 1990s, adding Brambleton Golf Course in Ashburn, VA, and then later, in 2006, adding Aldie Mill Historic Park. The agency recently added a new facility at Occoquan Regional Park, named after former board member and Fairfax County leader Jean Packard.

In 2022, NOVA Parks acquired Winkler Botanical Preserve as part of an arrangement between NOVA Parks, the city of Alexandria, and the Winkler Organization, which had been the owner.

== Historic sites ==
NOVA Parks manages a number of parks that have historical significance, including an 18th-century mansion, a Civil War battlefield, a 19th-century grist mill, a 200-year-old working farm, a Civil War era church, and many more. Major venues include Carlyle House, the former Alexandria, Virginia home of British merchant John Carlyle; Ball's Bluff Battlefield and National Cemetery, a park in Leesburg, VA that was the site of a Civil War conflict in 1861; Mt. Zion Church and the adjacent Gilbert's Corner Regional Park, in Aldie, VA which were used as a Civil War military rendezvous site, prison, barracks, battleground and hospital; and Aldie Mill Historic Park, a restored mill, with a four-story brick structure with tandem metal Water wheels. Other venues include a kiln used by female prisoners from the Lorton Reformatory during the Women's suffrage Movement, as well Temple Hall Farm and White’s Ford Regional Park, located on the farm formerly owned by Elijah V. White.

During 2018, NOVA Parks also added property near Middleburg, VA, henceforth known as the Battle of Upperville | Goose Creek Regional Park. The roughly 20-acre space features hiking trails and interpretive information, as well as Goose Creek Stone Bridge that was constructed prior to the Civil War.

== Waterparks ==
NOVA Parks operates a total of five waterparks with differing sizes and features. These include Atlantis Waterpark at Bull Run Regional Park (Centreville), Great Waves Waterpark at Cameron Run Regional Park (Alexandria), Pirate’s Cove Waterpark at Pohick Bay Regional Park (Lorton, VA), Ocean Dunes Waterpark at Upton Hill Regional Park (Arlington) and Volcano Island Waterpark at Algonkian Regional Park (Sterling, VA).

== Golf courses ==
NOVA Parks owns three 18-hole golf courses, including Algonkian, Brambleton and Pohick Bay. Each has a different layout and is Audubon International certified.

== Constituent parks ==
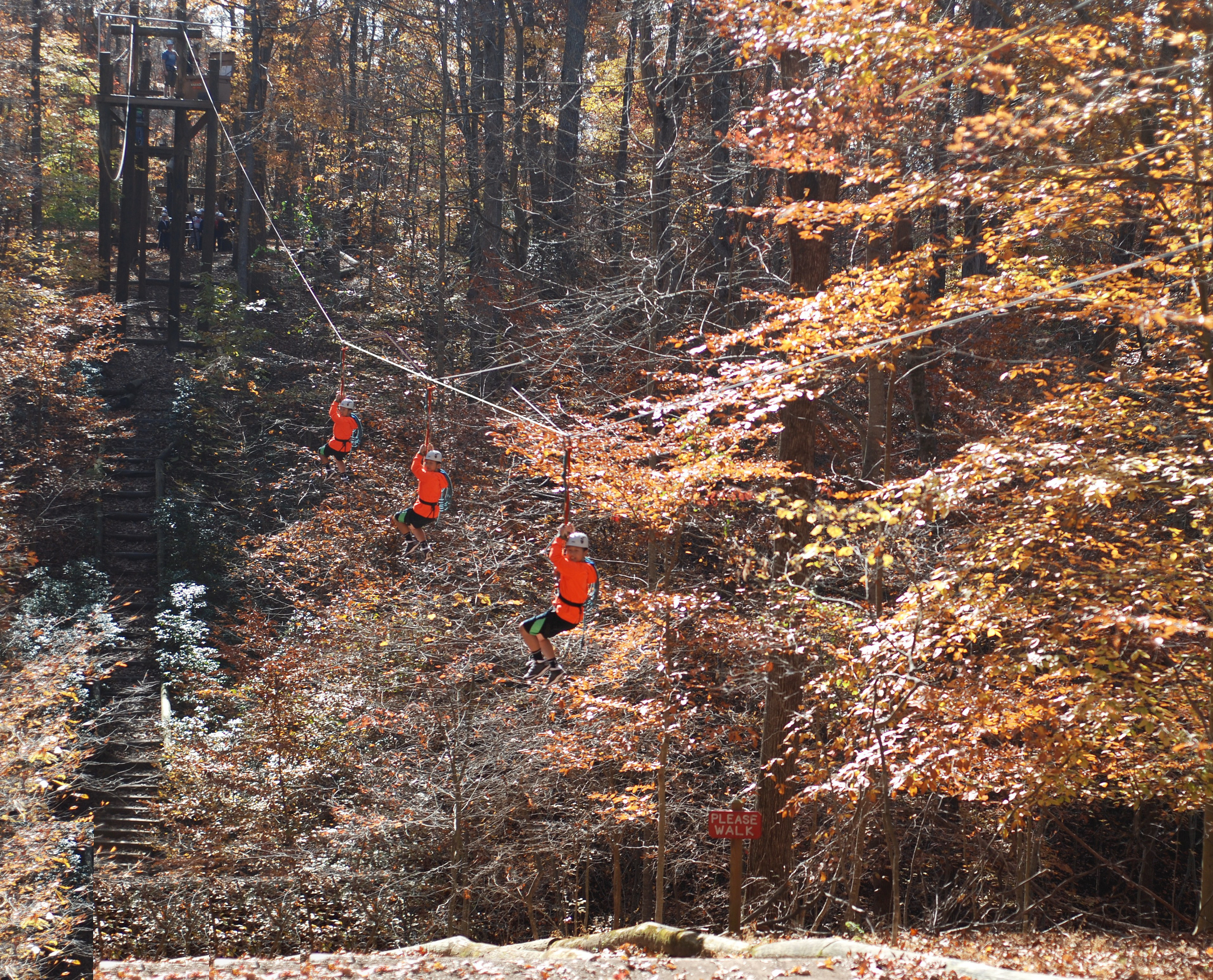
Zipline at Hemlock Overlook Regional Park

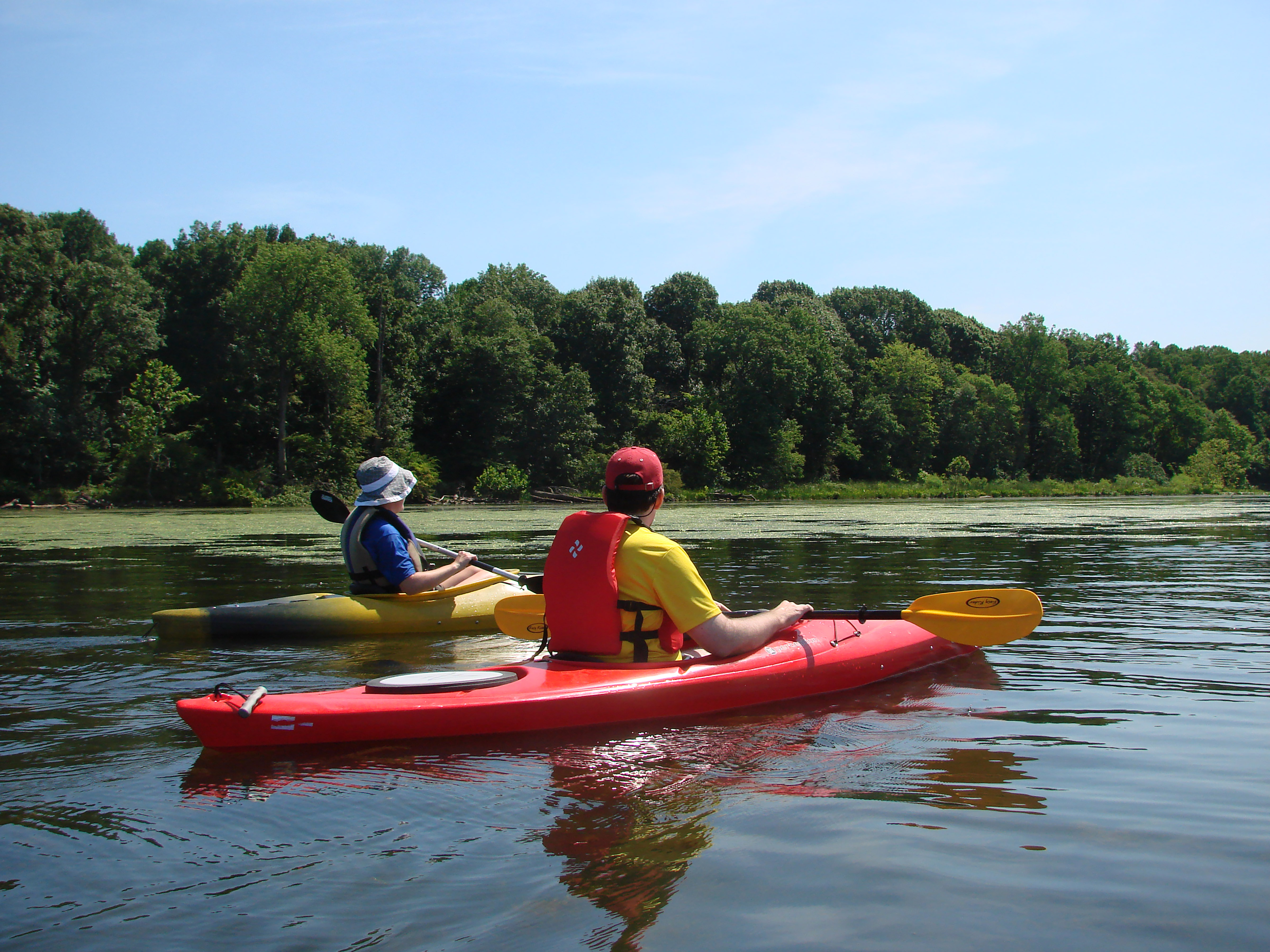
Kayakers explore the waters at Occoquan Regional Park in Lorton, VA.

The regional parks and other features administered by NOVA Parks include:

1. Aldie Mill Historic Park
2. Algonkian Regional Park
3. Ball's Bluff Battlefield and National Cemetery
4. Beaverdam Reservoir
5. Blue Ridge Regional Park
6. Brambleton Regional Park
7. Bull Run Marina
8. Cameron Run Regional Park
9. Carlyle House Historic Park
10. Fountainhead Regional Park
11. Gateway Regional Park
12. Goose Creek Historic Park
13. Gilbert's Corner Regional Park
14. Hemlock Overlook Regional Park
15. Meadowlark Botanical Gardens
16. Mt. Defiance Historic Park
17. Mt. Zion Historic Park
18. Occoquan Regional Park
19. Piscataway Crossing Regional Park
20. Pohick Bay Regional Park
21. Potomac Overlook Regional Park
22. Red Rock Wilderness Overlook Regional Park
23. Rust Sanctuary
24. Sandy Run Regional Park
25. Seneca Regional Park
26. Temple Hall Farm Regional Park
27. Tinner Hill Historic Park
28. Turning Point Suffragist Memorial
29. Upton Hill Regional Park
30. Washington and Old Dominion Railroad Regional Park
31. Webb Nature Sanctuary
32. Winkler Botanical Preserve

== See also ==
- List of parks in the Baltimore–Washington metropolitan area
