= Bull Run-Occoquan Trail =

Hiking trail in Virginia, United States

Coordinates: 38°43′30″N 77°19′49″W

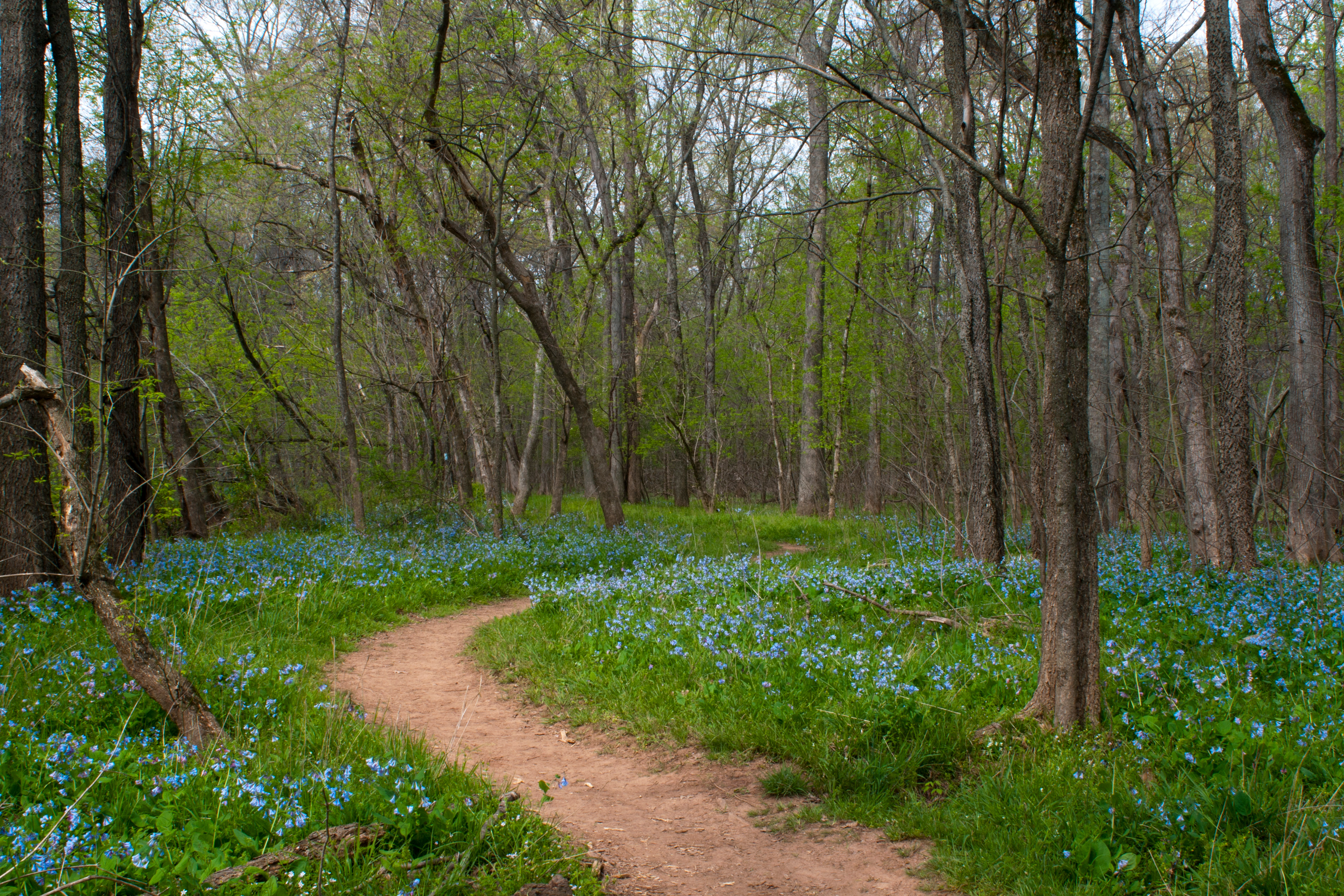
- Length: 19.6 mi (31.5 km)
- Location: Fairfax County, Virginia, United States
- Designation: National Recreation Trail in 2006
- Use: Hiking, Horseback Riding

The Bull Run-Occoquan Trail (BROT) is a hiking trail in the U.S. state of Virginia. Designated in 2006 as a National Recreation Trail, the Bull Run-Occoquan Trail invites hikers and horseback riders to discover more than 4,000 acres of scenic woodlands.

== Description ==
The approximately 20 mile trail runs along Bull Run from Bull Run Regional Park down through Hemlock Overlook Regional Park to Fountainhead Regional Park. East of the Bull Run Marina, the stream becomes the Occoquan Reservoir, which (with filtration) currently provides drinking water for approximately half of Fairfax County. In the other direction, the trail rises over steep wooded hillsides, winds through deep ravines and crosses numerous streams and flood plains and becomes fairly level west of Route 28. Much of the trail is mixed-use with equestrians and mountain bikes (which are restricted to the segments nearer the Potomac River, east of the Bull Run Marina). Hiking may be considered moderately strenuous, and trail users are encouraged to carry ample water and wear appropriate foot and ankle support. Many parks along the trail are open seasonally and should not be regarded as reliable sources of food, water or emergency care.

During the early years of the American Civil War, the Bull Run/Occoquan River formed the boundary of the "Alexandria Line", which Confederate forces established to protect their capitol from Union advances before the First Battle of Bull Run. A skirmish occurred near Blackburn's Ford along the upper part of this trail on July 18, 1861. Between Blackburn's Ford and Union Mills, the former Southern Railway trestle over Pope's Head Creek is visible; the upper structure was burned several times during the multi-year conflict. An earthen fort constructed to protect another ford can still be seen at Little Rocky Run. Lands surrounding the trail are now subject to 5-acre zoning, so the roads to the five major trailheads (Bull Run Regional Park, Route 28, Hemlock Overlook Regional Park, Bull Run Marina and Fountainhead Regional Park) retain a semi-rural character.

This blue-blazed trail is one of many trails maintained by the Potomac Appalachian Trail Club.

=== Bluebell Trail ===
The middle of April is when the bluebell flowers are in bloom, along with over 25 varieties of wildflowers found on this part of the trail. The 1.5-mile loop within Bull Run Regional Park has the highest concentration of Bluebells; however, the Bull Run-Occoquan Trail has these and other flowers throughout.

=== Bull Run Run ===
The first Bull Run Run was held by the Virginia Happy Trails Running Club in April 1993. It is a 50-mile footrace following the course of the Bull Run-Occoquan Trail in an out-and-back format.

From the year 2006 through 2011, there were 310 to 340 runners annually who started the race and 80% to 95% of them finished before the 13-hour cutoff. The overall course record is 6 hours, 8 minutes and 14 seconds, set by Matt Woods (31) in 2011.
