= Bull Run Regional Park =

Public park in Fairfax County, Virginia

Coordinates: 38.802°N 77.477°W

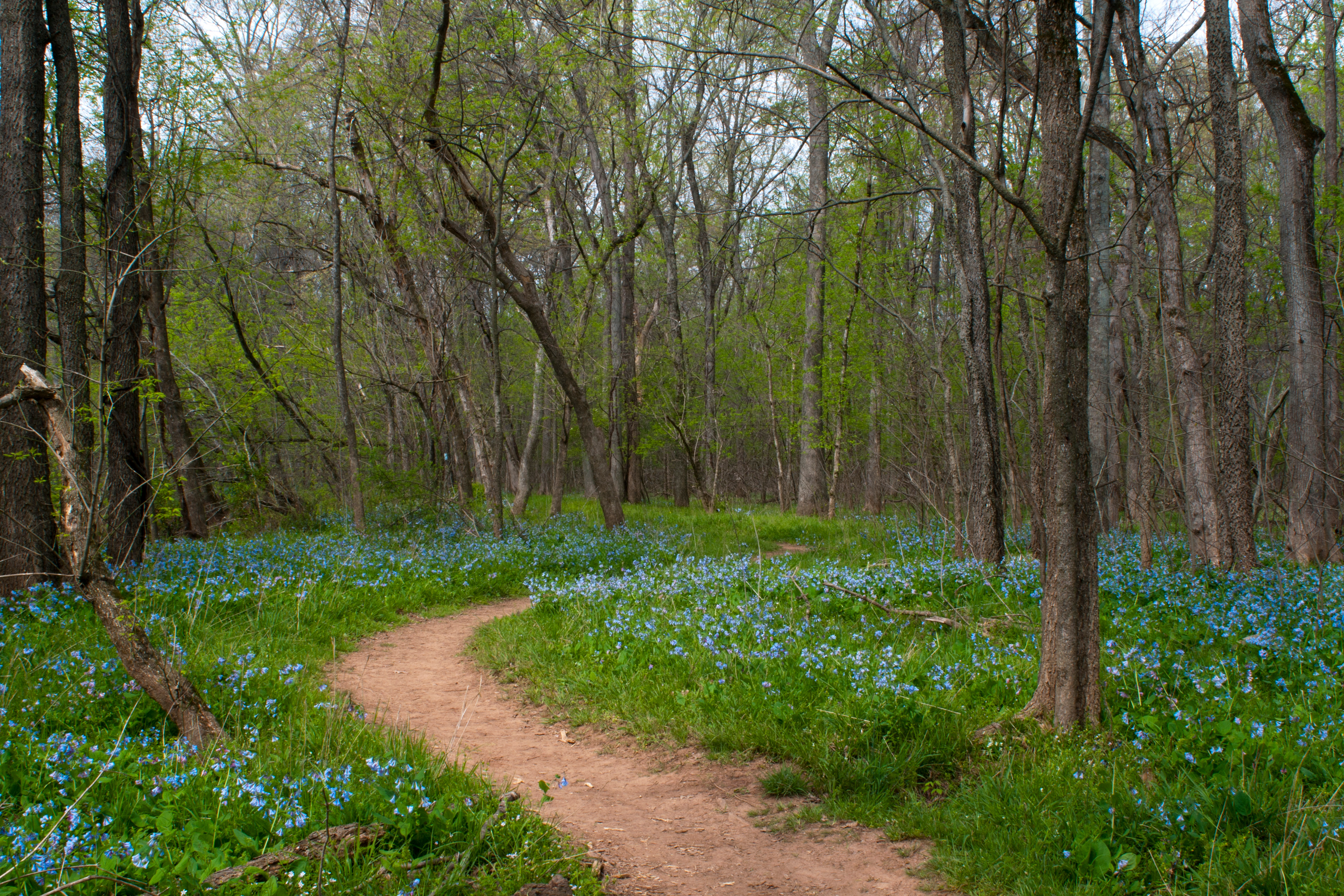
Virginia blue bells along the Blue Bell Trail in Bull Run Park

Bull Run Regional Park is a 1,568-acre (635 ha) multi-use facility located in Centreville, Virginia, owned and operated by the Northern Virginia Regional Park Authority.

The park is situated near Interstate 66, in the Bull Run / Occoquan Stream valley. It features numerous tree-lined meadows along the Bull Run stream, with day-use amenities such as picnic tables and shelters. The campground has a variety of RV sites with electric only, electric and water, and full service (water, electric and sewer). There are over 40 non-electric tent sites. The bathhouses offer private toilets, hot showers and laundry facilities. The store sells camping supplies, snacks, firewood, ice and Bull Run Merchandise. Additional features include the Bull Run Shooting Center (skeet, trap, and sporting clays), Atlantis Waterpark, playgrounds, disc golf and several nature and equestrian trails. Weather permitting, the park is open year-round. There is an admission charge for the park on weekends.

Bull Run Regional Park opened in 1960 and offered camping and picnicking. The property was purchased from economist Gardiner Means and his wife, Caroline Ware, who longed to see the land preserved from development and ultimately left to public use. Development of the park continued through the 1960s with addition of a skeet and trap shooting center, a large swimming pool and a miniature golf course.

In the late 1970s, Bull Run became known for producing and hosting large concerts. Eventually, a large capacity special events center was built in the mid-1980s to provide an amphitheater with a capacity of over 10,000 people. A winter drive-through holiday light show became a part of the park's offerings in 1995, and is viewed by thousands annually; extending for more than 2 miles, it is reported to be one of the nation's largest such displays. Bull Run is also home to Atlantis Waterpark.

Leading from the property is the 19.6 mile Bull Run Occoquan Trail, which was home to a great deal of various action over the years, in the form of Native American trails, trade routes, and later as civil war supply routes. Eight locations to access the trail system include: 1) Bull Regional Park, 2) VA 28 bridge over Bull Run, Centreville, about 12 parking spaces, 3) Balmoral Green Avenue, south of Compton Road, near Johnny Moore Creek, about 7 spaces, 4) Hemlock Overlook Regional Park, end of Yates Ford Road, about 15 parking spaces, 5) Bull Run Regional Marina Park, Old Yates Ford Road, 6) Wolf Run Shoals Road, end of, accessed via Clifton Road, about 3 spaces, 7) Fountainhead Regional Park, via Hampton Road, and 8) Van Thompson Road, accessed via Hampton Road, in Sandy Run Regional Park.
