= Fountainhead Regional Park =

Regional park in Virginia, United States

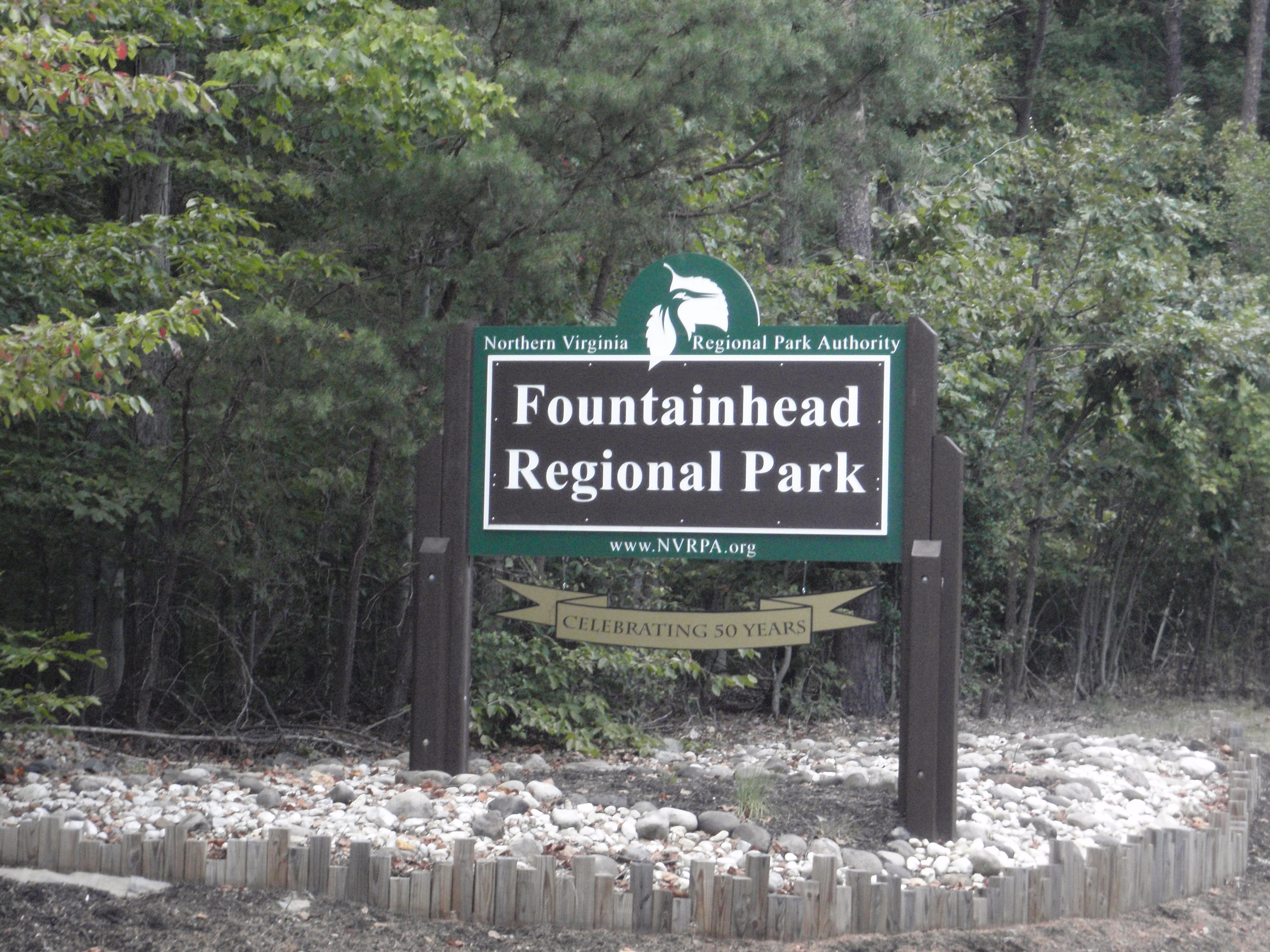
- Entrance to Fountainhead Regional Park
- Interactive map of Fountainhead Regional Park
- Location: Fairfax Station, Fairfax County, Virginia
- Coordinates: 38°43′42″N 77°19′14″W
- Operator: NOVA Parks
- Open: All year
- Website: NVRPA Fountainhead site

Fountainhead Regional Park is an approximately 2,000 acre regional park, bordering a tributary of the Potomac River, in Fairfax County, northern Virginia.

The park is protected and managed by the NOVA Parks agency of Northern Virginia, formerly the Northern Virginia Regional Park Authority.

== Description ==
Fountainhead Park borders Fairfax Station and Clifton, Virginia, with land-use restrictions adjacent to the park to protect the water supply for half of Fairfax County, as well as the natural ecosystems. Most of the park is closed during the winter.

The park contains rolling hills, dense forests, and a stream (now a reservoir) that flows into the Potomac River. It has a preserved 18th century cemetery, 4 shared-use equestrian trails, a mountain biking trail, and a fishing pier.

=== Trails ===
The Bull Run-Occoquan Trail begins (or ends) in this park, and continues upstream through Hemlock Overlook Regional Park to Bull Run Regional Park in Centreville.

The park's unique feature for Northern Virginia is the 10.9 miles (17.5 km) mountain biking trail which was improved and rehabilitated by the Fountainhead Project, funded by a grant, local and state government resources along with business and private donations.

=== Water recreation ===
The park also features water activities between mid-March and November. Canoe, kayak and johnboat (with small engine) rentals are available, as are fishing supplies (a fishing license is required). Guided canoe trips and paddleboard lessons are offered during the summer. Boats launched from the park (fee charged) are limited to motor sizes at or under 10 horsepower.

== See also ==
- NOVA Parks system
- Regional parks in Virginia
