= Foley Branch (Bull Run tributary) =

Stream in Virginia, USA

Foley Branch Tributary to Bull Run
- Location of Foley Branch mouth Foley Branch (Bull Run tributary) (the United States)

Location
- Country: United States
- State: Virginia
- County: Fairfax; Prince William; Loudoun

Physical characteristics
- Source: South Fork Broad Run divide
  - coordinates: 38°55′31″N 077°33′17″W
  - elevation: 335 ft (102 m)
- Mouth: Bull Run
  - location: about 2.5 miles northeast of Catharpin, Virginia
  - coordinates: 38°53′11″N 077°33′17″W
  - elevation: 223 ft (68 m)
- Length: 1.98 mi (3.19 km)
- Basin size: 1.56 square miles (4.0 km^{2})
- Discharge
  - location: Bull Run
  - average: 1.77 cu ft/s (0.050 m^{3}/s) at mouth with Bull Run

Basin features
- Progression: south
- River system: Potomac River
- Tributaries
  - left: unnamed tributaries
  - right: unnamed tributaries
- Bridges: Mineral Springs Circle, Destiny Drive, Braddock Road, Lennox Hale Drive, Winning Glory Drive

Foley Branch is a 1.98 mi (3.19 km) long first-order tributary to Bull Run in Loudoun County, Virginia.

== Course ==
Foley Branch rises on the South Fork Broad Run divide about 2.25 miles northeast of Catharpin, Virginia and then flows south to join Bull Run about 2.5 miles northeast of Arcola, Virginia.

== Watershed ==
Massey Creek drains 6.30 square miles (16.3 km^{2}) of area, receives about 47.1 in/year of precipitation, and is about 24.64% forested.

== See also ==
- List of rivers of Virginia
