= Pohick Bay Regional Park =

Protected area in northeastern Virginia

Coordinates: 38.675°N 77.177°W

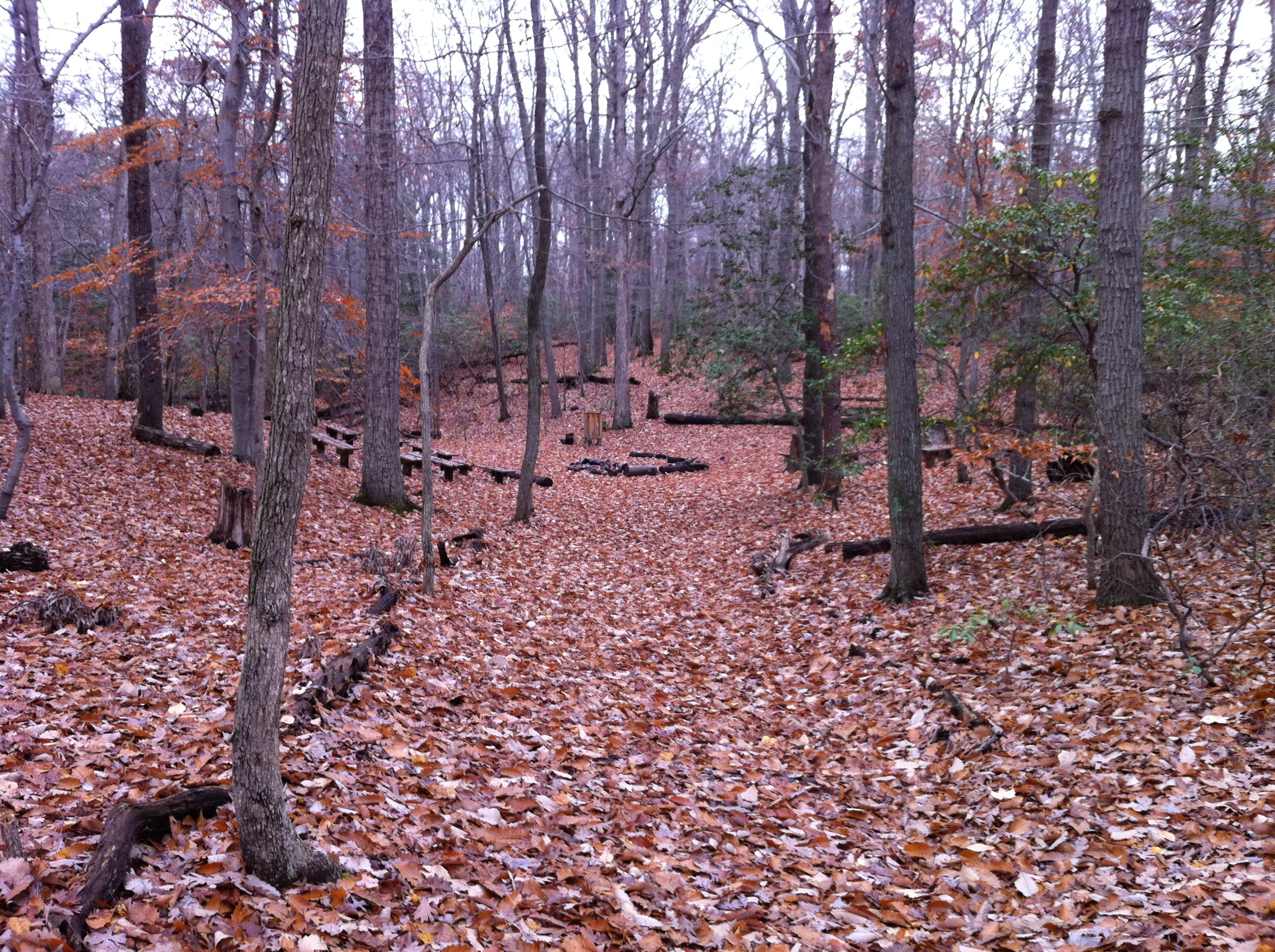
Amphitheatre in the park

Pohick Bay Regional Park is a regional park on Pohick Bay of the Potomac River, in Fairfax County, in Northern Virginia.

== Geography and Wildlife ==
The park is located on State Route 242, north of Mason Neck State Park.

It is protected and operated by the NOVA Parks agency of Northern Virginia, formerly the Northern Virginia Regional Park Authority.

The park is home to much wildlife, with checklists showing it is home to as many as 20 different species of bird.

=== Water recreation ===
Pohick Bay Regional Park includes a boat launch; and the Pirate's Cove water park.

=== Golfing ===
Pohick Bay Regional Park includes a disc golf course alongside a miniature golf course.

== See also ==
- NOVA Parks system
- Regional parks in Virginia
