= Occoquan Regional Park =

Regional park in Virginia, United States

Coordinates: 38°41′1″N 77°15′7″W

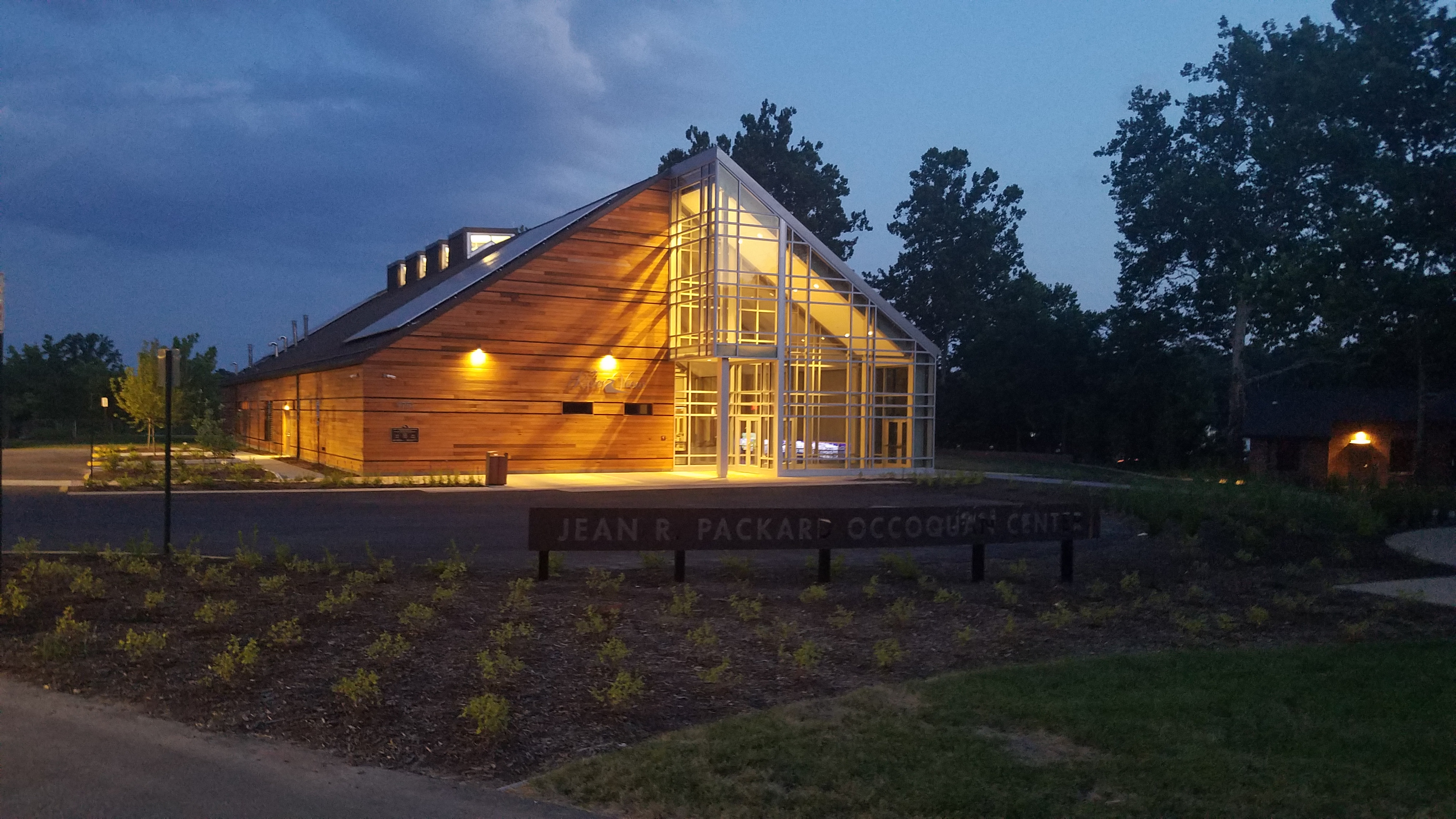
The River View at Occoquan Regional Park in Lorton opened in 2018, part of the Jean R. Packard Center. The center also features Brickmakers Cafe.

Occoquan Regional Park is a regional park along a tributary of the Potomac River, located in Lorton in Fairfax County in Northern Virginia, United States.

It is protected and operated by the NOVA Parks agency of Northern Virginia.

== Features ==
The park has dense forests, paved walking and biking trails, the Turning Point Suffragist Memorial, and water access for the Occoquan River, a tributary that flows into the Potomac River. At the park's center is a large, beehive brick kiln, the last of what had been as many as eight others that were used during the turn of the last century to produce many of the bricks found in Washington, D.C. and the surrounding area. The bricks were mainly made by prisoners of the neighboring Lorton Reformatory, which closed in 2001.

The park also has the Jean R. Packard Center, a large wedding and events facility called the River View, as well as a Brickmakers Cafe. The Packard Center opened in June 2018, and was named after Jean R. Packard, an environmental activist and the former chair of the Fairfax County Board of Supervisors, as well as a long time NOVA Parks board member. She died in 2014.

For public recreation it has a paved mixed use path, picnic shelters, seasonal kayak rentals, a 5 km loop trail, a batting cage, athletic fields and a public marina.

== See also ==
- NOVA Parks system
- Regional parks in Virginia
