= Turning Point Suffragist Memorial =

Monument in Lorton, Virginia

- Interactive map of Turning Point Suffragist Memorial
- Location: Lorton, Virginia
- Coordinates: 38°40′56″N 77°15′10.5″W
- Opening date: May 16, 2021; 4 years ago
- Website: Official website
- Owner: Suffrage Education Institute

The Turning Point Suffragist Memorial is a monument to American suffragists. The memorial is located in Lorton, Virginia's Occoquan Regional Park and stands in close proximity to Occoquan Workhouse, a prison where 168 suffragists were once held during the 1910s Silent Sentinels demonstrations. At the workhouse, suffragists were treated inhumanely, and after a violent Night of Terror, the suffrage movement gained extra momentum. The organizers behind the memorial chose the location because of the historical significance of the Night of Terror.

The memorial opened in May 2021. It was planned to coincide with the 2020 centennial of the ratification of the 19th amendment, which gave women the right to vote in the U.S. The memorial's planners raised funds from individuals and Fairfax County. NOVA Parks, which previously held the memorial's land, pledged a free land transfer and permanent maintenance of the site. The National Park Service donated a section of White House fence, forged in the 1800s, to the memorial. Nancy Lyons Sargeant, president of the memorial association, described the memorial as an educational way of sharing history that could inspire "the need for vigilance in the quest for equal rights." During the dedication ceremony, Deborah Wake, the president of the Virginia League of Women Voters, spoke about the fight for voting rights continuing into the present.

The memorial has 19 parts, covering the history of the suffrage movement from 1848 to 1920. It claims to be the first memorial to cover the whole period. There are three life-size bronze statues of prominent suffragists Alice Paul, Mary Church Terrell, and Carrie Chapman Catt. It also includes replica White House gates to commemorate the Silent Sentinels demonstrations and a 24-foot section of real White House fencing. A commemorative wall honors the names of all the suffragists jailed in 1917. Other stations were designed to explain court cases that rejected women's rights, the jailing of suffragists and the Night of Terror, nine suffrage campaigns that failed, and state ratification campaigns. A memorial garden at the monument highlights the suffrage-related colors of purple, gold, and white, which were used by the National Women's Party.

== See also ==
- Women's Suffrage National Monument
