= Hemlock Overlook Regional Park =

Park in Virginia, United States

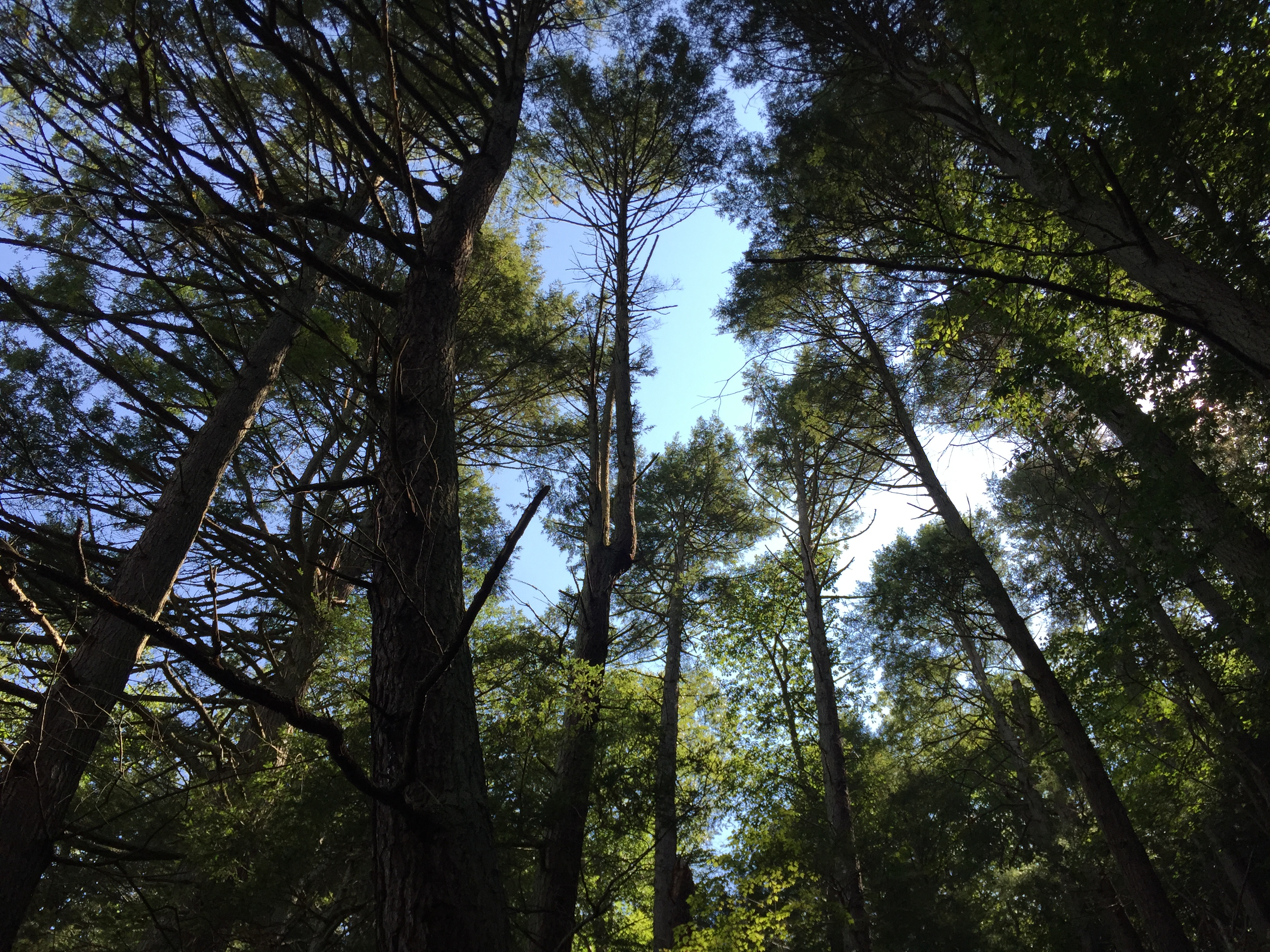
- Hemlock grove in Hemlock Overlook Regional Park
- Interactive map of Hemlock Overlook Regional Park
- Location: Clifton, Virginia, U.S.
- Coordinates: 38°46′13″N 77°24′35″W
- Area: 400 acres (161.87 ha)
- Operator: NOVA Parks
- Open: year round access

Hemlock Overlook Regional Park is a multi-use park near Clifton, Virginia, one of several parks lining the Bull Run. The 400-acre park offers dense forests, hilly woodlands, and floodplain scenery. Hemlock Overlook is named after the grove of hemlock trees above the banks in the northern section of the park.

At the northern edge of the park is the site of the Union Mills and the bridge crossing for the Orange and Alexandria Railroad over the Bull Run; both of these sites have high significance in the Battles of Bull Run. The site of a dam that supported the first hydroelectric power generation to Fairfax County, Virginia, is also on the Hemlock Overlook site. A permanent orienteering course, built with the support of the Quantico Orienteering Club, sits in the southern end of the park, south of Yates Ford Road. The Bull Run-Occoquan Trail (blue trail) is maintained by the PATC.

From 1984 to 2009, Hemlock Overlook operated as a university outdoor education center, through a partnership between George Mason University and the Park Authority. Warren Doyle, of Appalachian Trail lore, was a Director. In 2009, the Park Authority engaged a partner, Adventure Links, to operate the facility. In 2021, the Park Authority put out a Request for Proposal for new operating partners. A new operator, Horizons at Hemlock Overlook, part of Endless Horizons, has been chosen to partner with the Park Authority.
