= Big Schloss =

Mountain in Virginia, USA

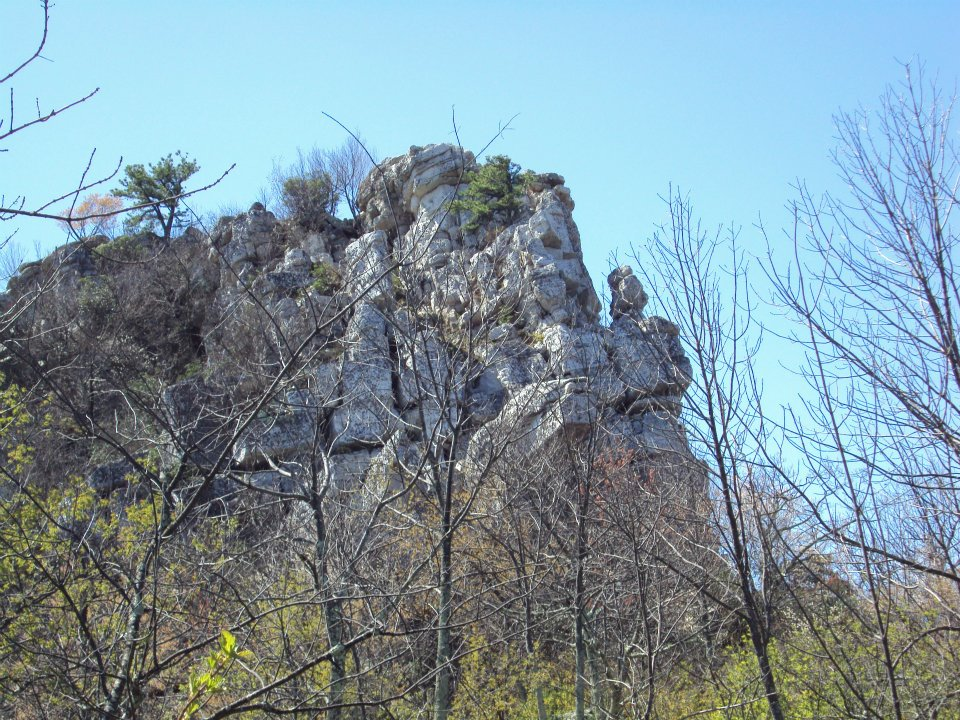

Highest point
- Elevation: 2,964 ft (903 m)
- Coordinates: 38°56′26″N 78°39′57″W

Geography
- Location within Virginia
- Location: Shenandoah County, Virginia / Hardy County, West Virginia, U.S.
- Parent range: Ridge and Valley Appalachians
- Topo map(s): USGS Wardensville, Wolf Gap, Woodstock

Climbing
- Easiest route: Hike

Big Schloss is a peak in the Great North Mountain range of the Ridge and Valley Appalachians, with an elevation of 2,964 feet (903 m). The peak is located in George Washington National Forest on the border of Virginia and West Virginia, though according to Topozone, the actual summit is in Virginia. The trail is part of the Lee Ranger District. It features a rocky outcropping of white sandstone with expansive views into Trout Run Valley in West Virginia and Little Schloss Mountain in Virginia.

German settlers gave Big Schloss its name. Schloss is German for "castle", and the name is a reference to the rocky outcrop. German was the common language in the area for several years.

A number of hiking trails lead to Big Schloss. Hikers may ascend from Wolf Gap Recreation Area via the Mill Mountain trail, or a circuit hike coming from FDR Rt. 92. The Potomac Appalachian Trail Club maintains the trails leading up to Big Schloss. A bridge provides access to the Big Schloss rock outcropping. In the Fall of 2010, the bridge was replaced with new stairs, 20' of new handrails, and two new concrete abutments.
