= Upton Hill Regional Park =

Regional park in Virginia, United States

Coordinates: 38.8707°N 77.1442°W

Upton Hill Regional Park is a regional park located in Arlington, Northern Virginia. The park contains a waterpark, batting cages and a miniature golf course. The batting cages include nine baseball and softball cages. It is owned and operated by the NOVA Parks agency of Northern Virginia.

Upton's Hill played a locally important role during the Civil War, as the Union Army command used the site as its headquarters. A large masonry fort was constructed opposite the road, at the hill's topmost point. This fort was originally called Fort Upton but was later renamed Fort Ramsay. By the end of the war, the Union Army built a tall wooden observation tower atop Congressman Upton's home, affording it line-of-sight communications with the Washington Monument and other observation and signal stations in the region.

== History ==
For much of the 1960s, this was the headquarters for the American Nazi Party. During that time, some called it “hatemongers hill.” The American Nazi Party was run by George Lincoln Rockwell and later Matt Koehl. Where park facilities are today, Stormtroopers Barracks once stood, complete with the swastika symbol on the building. Armed guards would keep out all but the Nazis and their guests. A year later, in 1967, Rockwell was shot and killed by another Nazi in front of a laundromat on Wilson Boulevard. Within months of Rockwell's assassination, the Nazis lost their lease, and the property was put up for sale. The land passed first to a development company, and then to The Northern Virginia Regional Park Authority in 1973. The former barracks were demolished and park facilities were built.

== Features ==
Upton Hill Regional Park features picnic areas, a water park, batting cages, and a miniature golf course.

The miniature golf course includes what was once the world's longest miniature golf hole, at 140 feet (43 m). The course was designed by minigolf designer Jim Bryant. As of 2017, this is no longer the case, as several other miniature golf courses have been constructed since with longer holes, with the current Guinness World Records holder in Cortlandville, New York having a hole 18 with a measured length of 459.5 feet (140.1 m).

== See also ==
- NOVA Parks system
- Regional parks in Virginia
