= Bull Run Marina Regional Park =

Park in Clifton, Virginia, United States

Coordinates: 38°44′34.8″N 77°23′12.6″W

Bull Run Marina Regional Park is a park in Clifton, Virginia, along Bull Run. The park has 5,000 acres (20 km^{2}) of preserved land.

The park has a marina, and has parts of the Bull Run-Occoquan Trail in it. The park hosts many events in crew and is a practice area for the Lake Braddock Secondary School crew team.
