= Meadowlark Botanical Gardens =

Botanical gardens and event venue in Vienna, Virginia, US

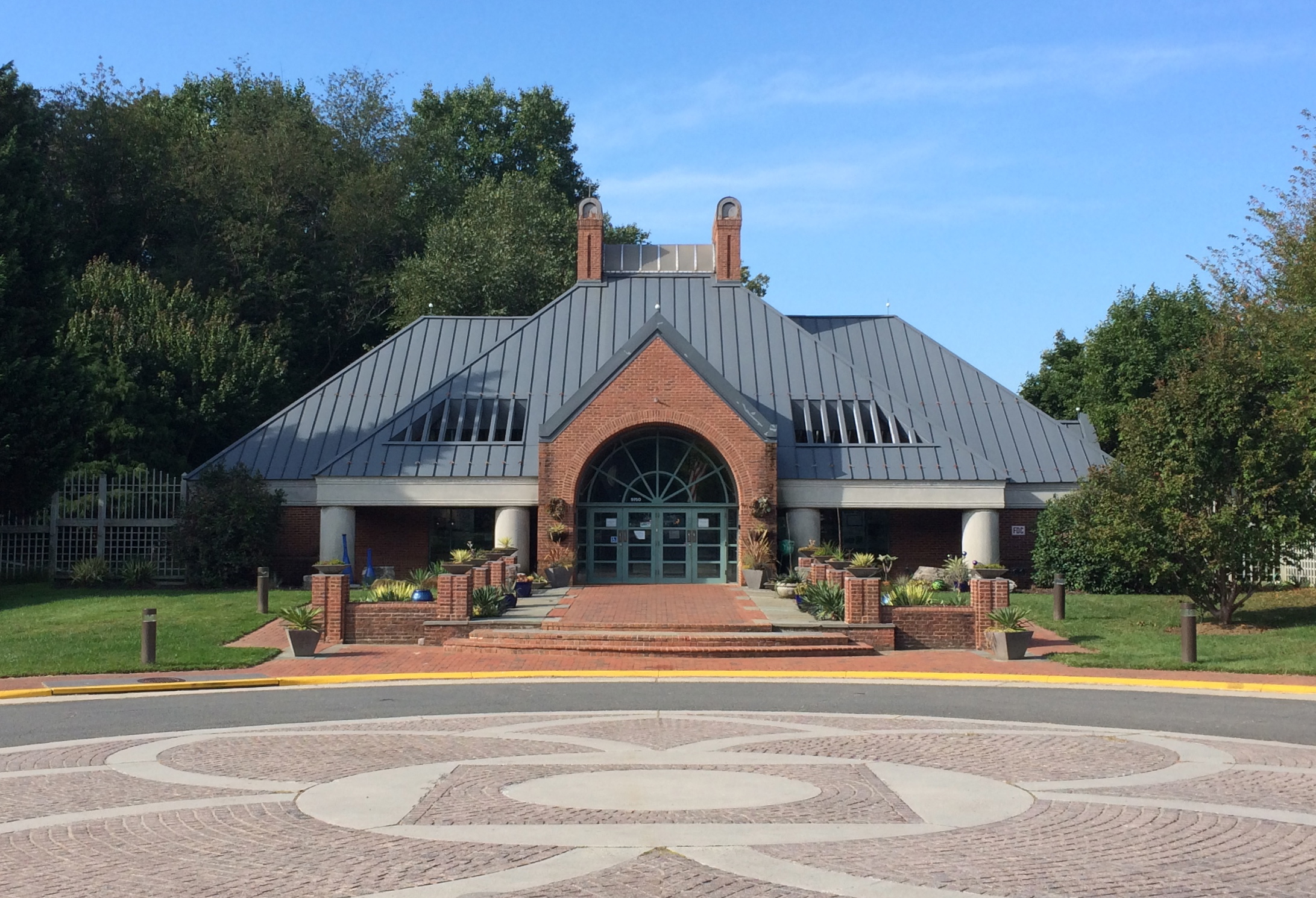
- Visitors Center at Meadowlark Gardens, Vienna, Virginia

- Location within Virginia
- Type: Botanical garden
- Location: 9750 Meadowlark Gardens Court Vienna, Virginia
- Coordinates: 38°56′16″N 77°16′51″W
- Operator: NOVA Parks
- Website: www.novaparks.com/parks/meadowlark-botanical-gardens

Meadowlark Botanical Gardens (95 acres) are botanical gardens and an event venue located at 9750 Meadowlark Gardens Court, in Vienna, Virginia.

They are open daily except for major holidays and ice; an admission fee is charged. Garden admissions end when the Visitor Center closes. The Visitor Center is open from 10AM until 3:30PM from November through March and from April through October 10AM until 6:30PM. Meadowlark Botanical Gardens closes 30 minutes after the Visitor Center's posted closing. The property is protected and operated by the NOVA Parks agency of Northern Virginia.

== Features ==
A significant structure, the Atrium, is used as a wedding and event venue. The gardens aspect of the property features three ponds, three gazebos, an island bridge, more than twenty varieties of cherry trees, aquatic plants, an azalea collection, a fern and hosta collection, an herb garden, a lilac garden, and perennials. They also contain three native plant collections as part of the International Agenda for Botanic Gardens in Conservation:

- Potomac Valley Collection – plants native to the Potomac River basin.
- Virginia Native Tree Collection – native trees for use in a home setting, including Asimina triloba, Carpinus caroliniana, Chionanthus virginicus, Magnolia virginiana, Ostrya virginiana, and Quercus lyrata.
- Virginia Native Wetland – A small wetland with local trees including Betula nigra, Liquidambar styraciflua, Nyssa sylvatica, Platanus occidentalis, Salix nigra, Taxodium distichum; aquatic plants such as Acorus calamus, Nymphaea odorata, Pontederia cordata, Sagittaria latifolia; and shoreline plants including Carex spp., Cyperus spp., Equisetum hyemale, Iris versicolor, Lobelia cardinalis, Myrica pensylvanica, Sarracenia purpurea, and Typha latifolia.

Over the winter holidays, the gardens put on a winter walk of christmas-themed lights that include refreshments.

=== Korean Bell Garden ===
==== Description ====
Large Korean bells trace back to the Shilla Dynasty (57 BC – 935 AD). The one in the Korean Bell Garden is made of bronze, weighs three tons, and is 2.18 meters high. It is called the Bell of Peace and Harmony. Korea's national flower, the rose of Sharon and Virginia's state flower, the dogwood are both engraved on the bell, along with the words "Peace and Harmony" and the ten traditional symbols of longevity – sun, mountain, water, cloud, stone, pine tree, white crane, turtle, mushroom of immortality and deer. The bell is held in a wooden pavilion that was built by Korean craftsmen in their country's traditional style – instead of using nails, they carved the wood so that each piece would fit together; the eaves of the pavilion curve upward; and the roof tiles are made of a type of clay called ocher.

==== History ====
The Korean Bell Garden is the first of its kind in the Western Hemisphere and the first Korean bell pavilion on the East Coast of the United States – the Korean Bell of Friendship and its pavilion were donated by South Korea to San Pedro, Los Angeles, California in 1976. The idea for the Korean Bell Garden was conceived of by Jeung-Hwa Elmejjad-Yi, who moved to the United States from Korea when she was a teenager. She founded the Korean American Cultural Committee in 2005 – two years after the centennial of the beginning of Korean immigration to the United States – as a means through which to realize her idea. In 2006, her organization reached an agreement with the Northern Virginia Regional Park Authority to have the garden built in Meadowlark Botanical Gardens. The project cost around $1 million: $600,000 for the bell and the pavilion; $100,000 for the surrounding garden; and $300,000 for long-term maintenance. Eighty percent of the costs were raised through donations from the Korean-American community in the Washington area, and the remaining twenty-percent was donated by the South Korean government.

The groundbreaking ceremony was held on June 27, 2010 – two days after the sixtieth anniversary of the Korean War. South Korean diplomats Jim Soon Nam and Yongchun Cho were present, as well as several U.S. politicians connected with the area. Some of the speakers included Cho, Virginia Congressman Jim Moran, Virginia State Senator Chap Petersen, and the Chairwoman of the Fairfax County Board of Supervisors, Sharon Bulova. American and South Korean veterans were in attendance and assisted with a photo exhibition of the Korean War.

Construction of the pavilion was completed in the fall of 2010, and the bell arrived from Korea in May 2011. A dedication ceremony for the bell was held on the fourteenth. The official opening ceremony for the garden was held about a year later on May 19, 2012. The ceremony was opened and closed by the Washington Korean Symphony Orchestra, which played the American and Korean National Anthems, the Korean folk song "Arirang", and a selection from American composer Leonard Bernstein's operetta Candide. Petersen and Belova both returned as speakers. Korea's Ambassador at the time, Choi Young-jin was present at the ceremony.

== Gallery ==
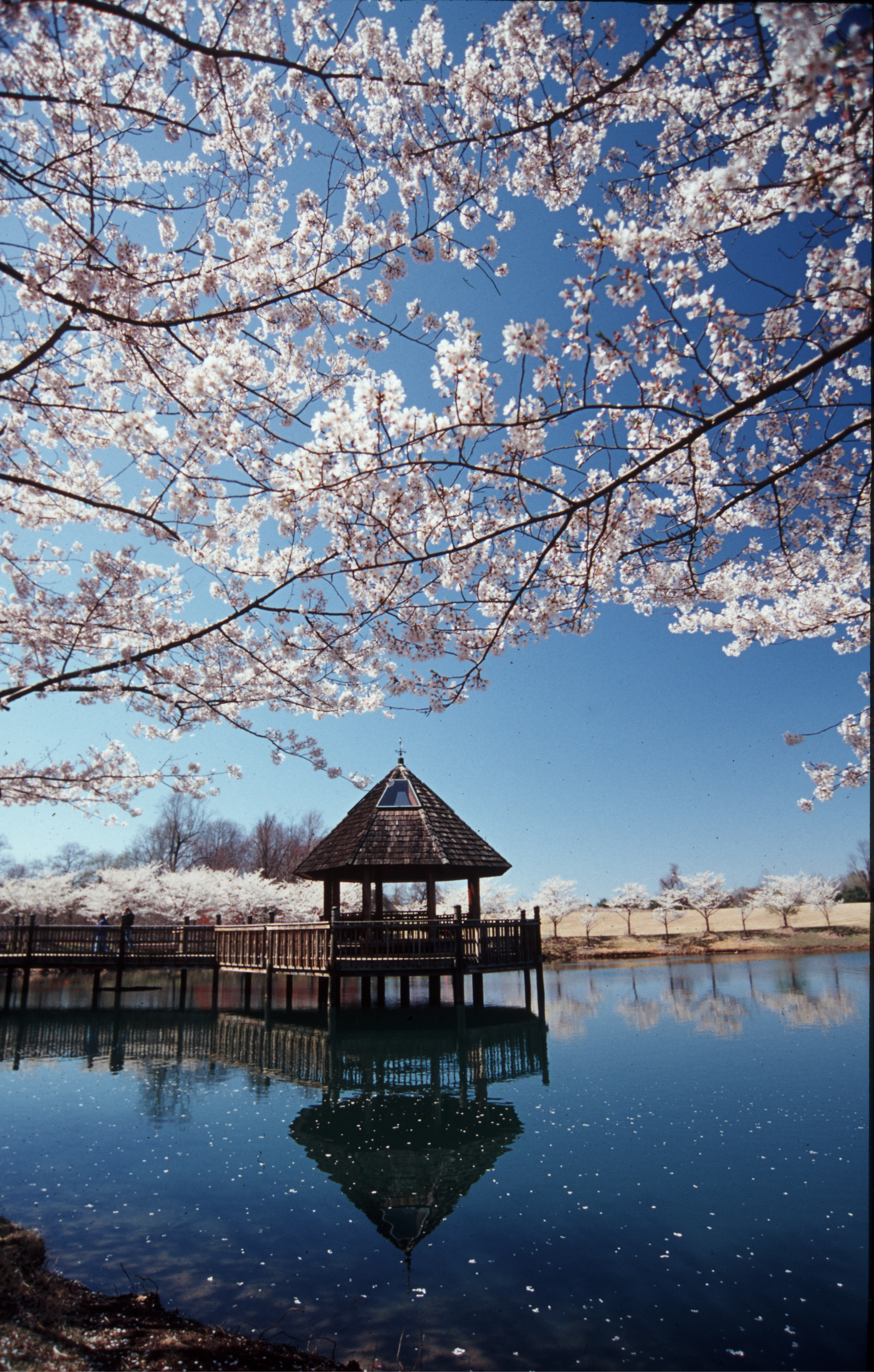
Lakeside Gazebo on Lake Caroline at cherry blossom time

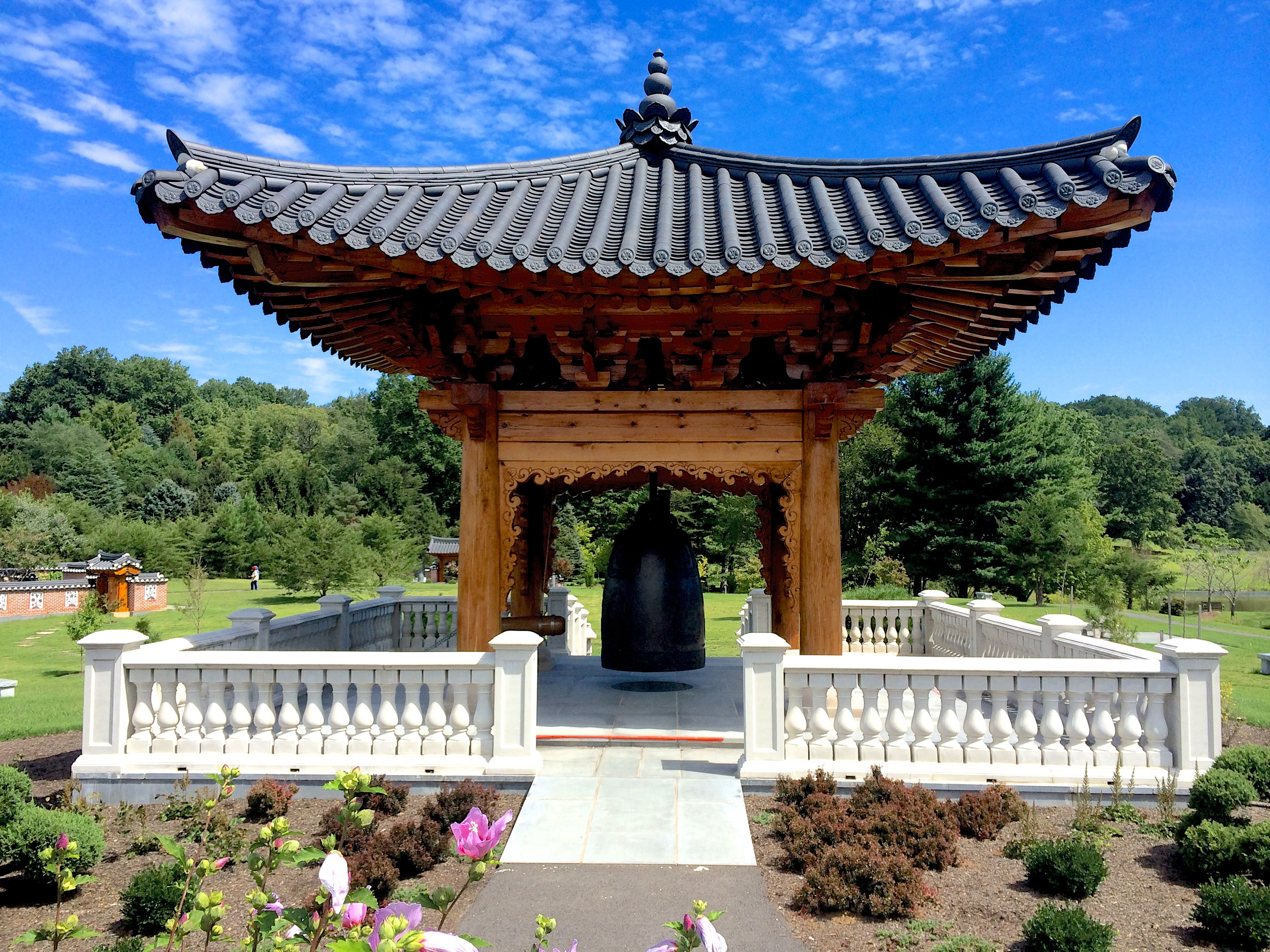
Korean Bell Pavilion at Meadowlark Gardens

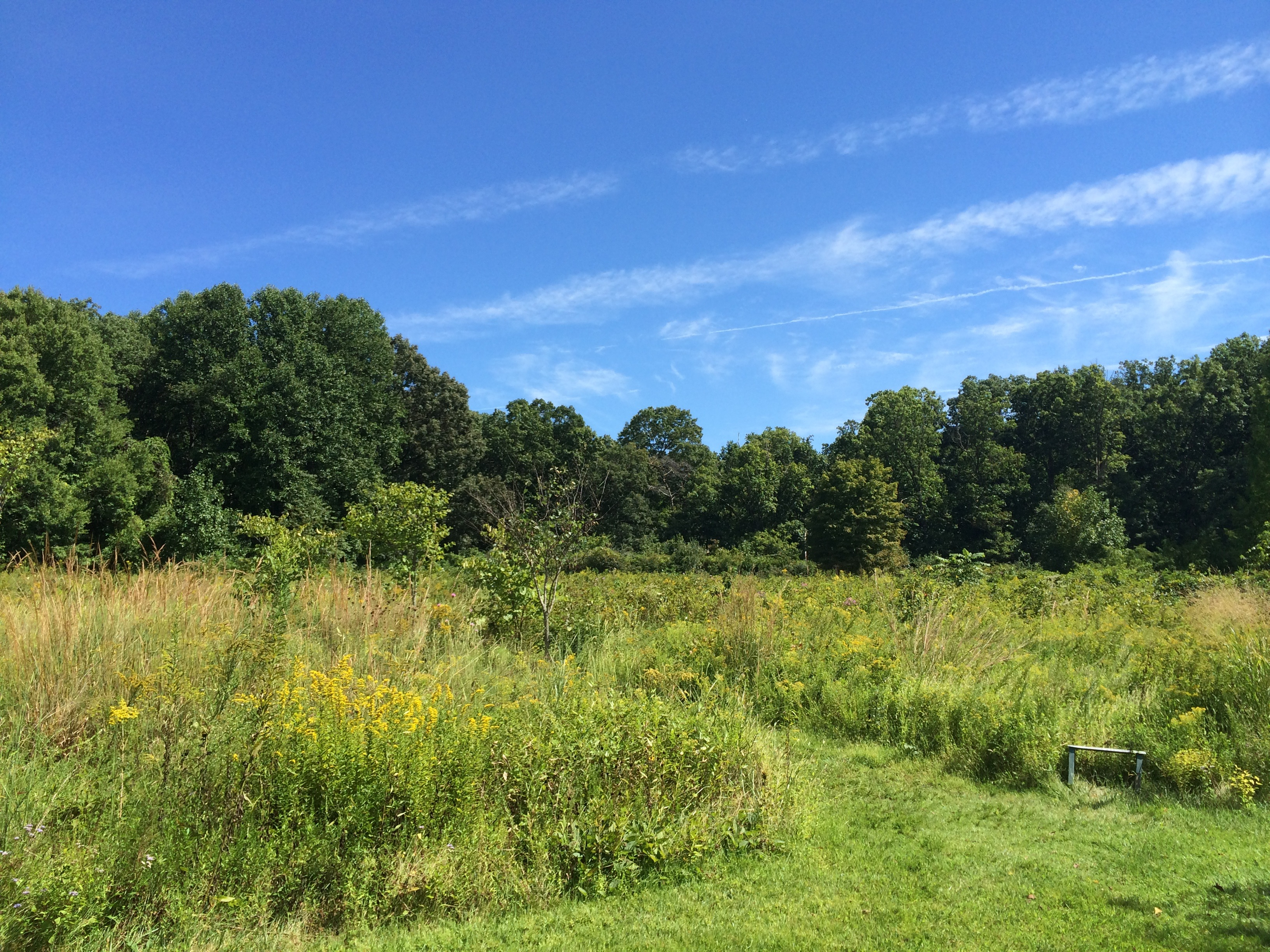
Experimental Meadow at Meadowlark Gardens

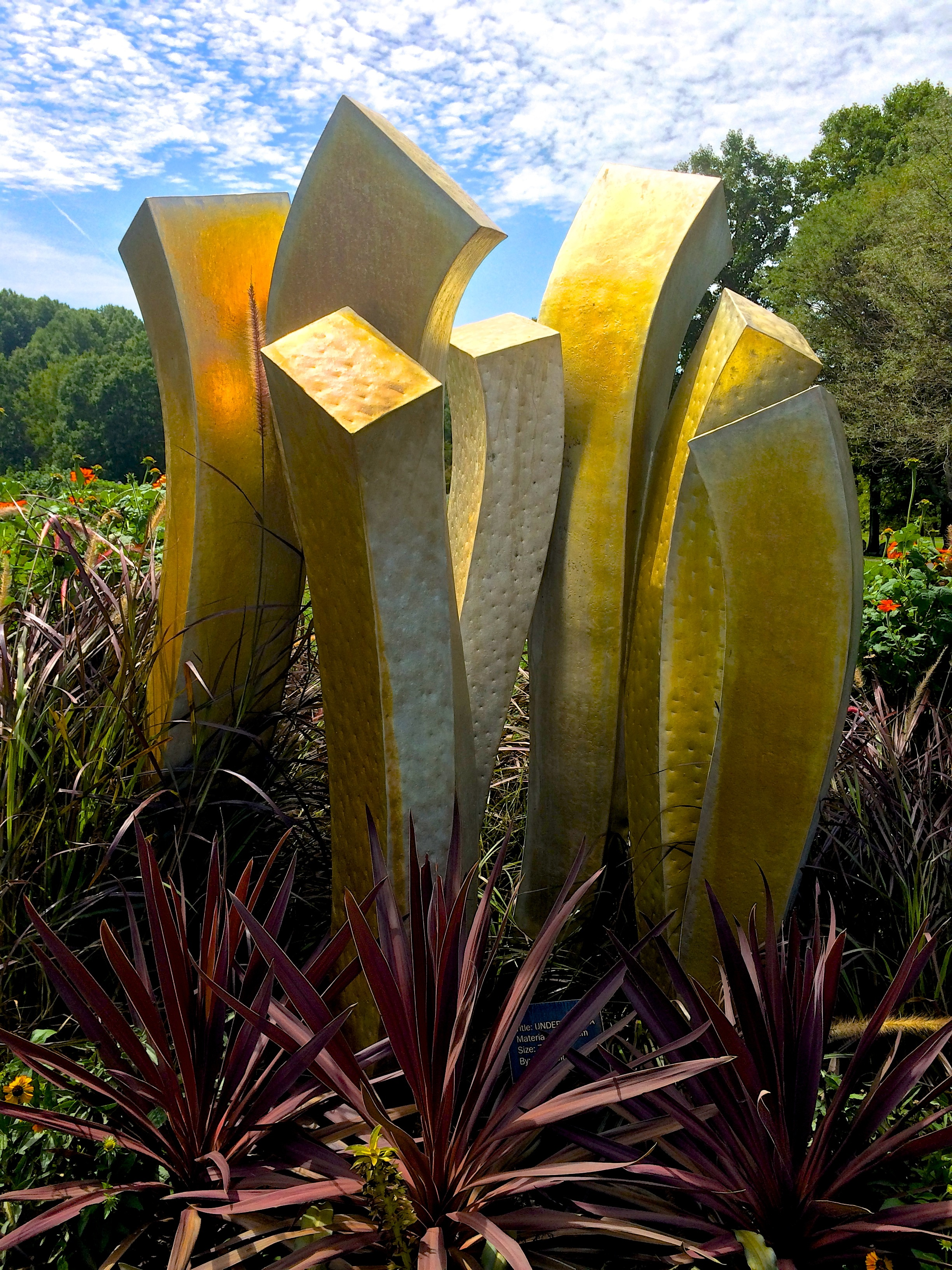
Garden sculpture at Meadowlark Gardens

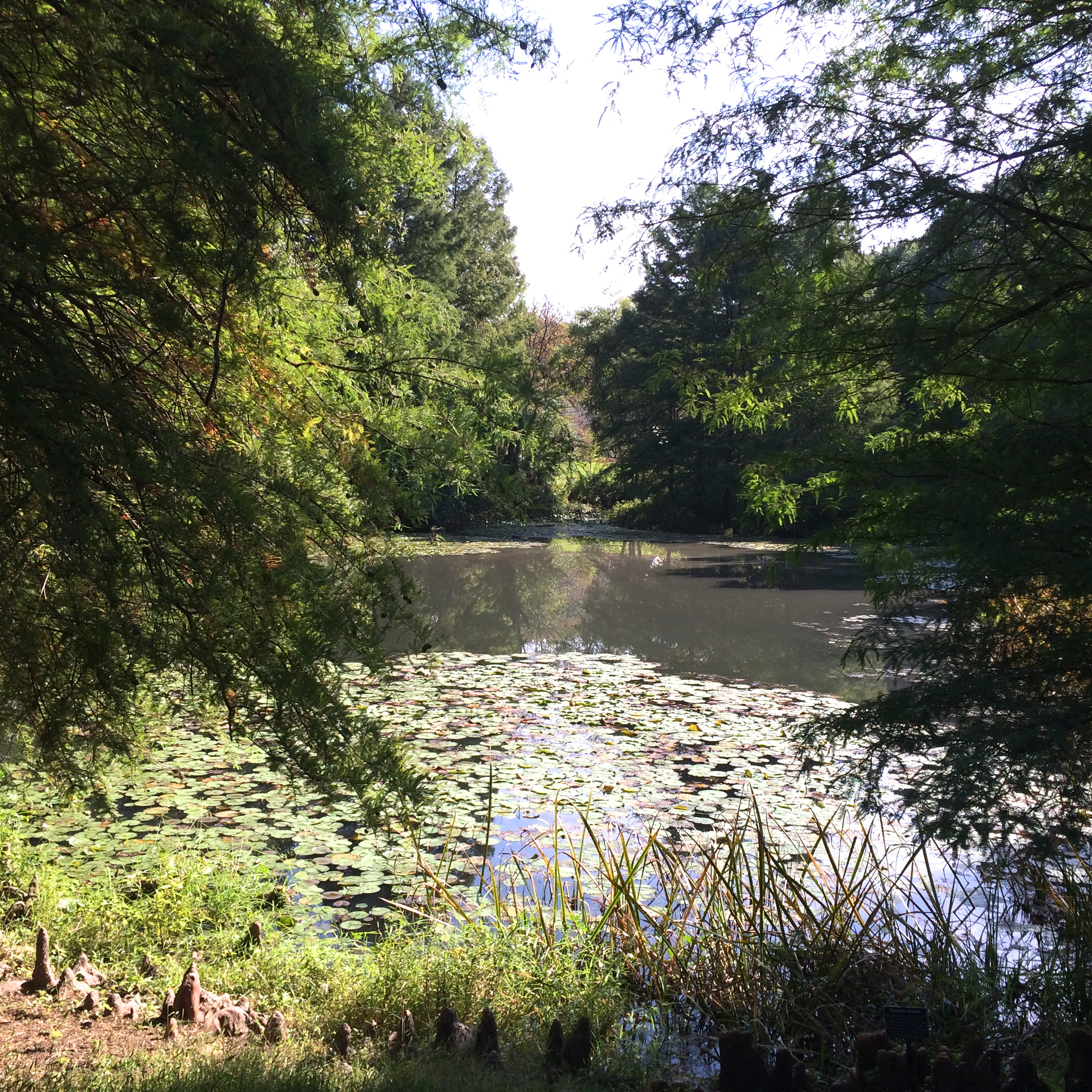
Lake Lena and the wetlands garden

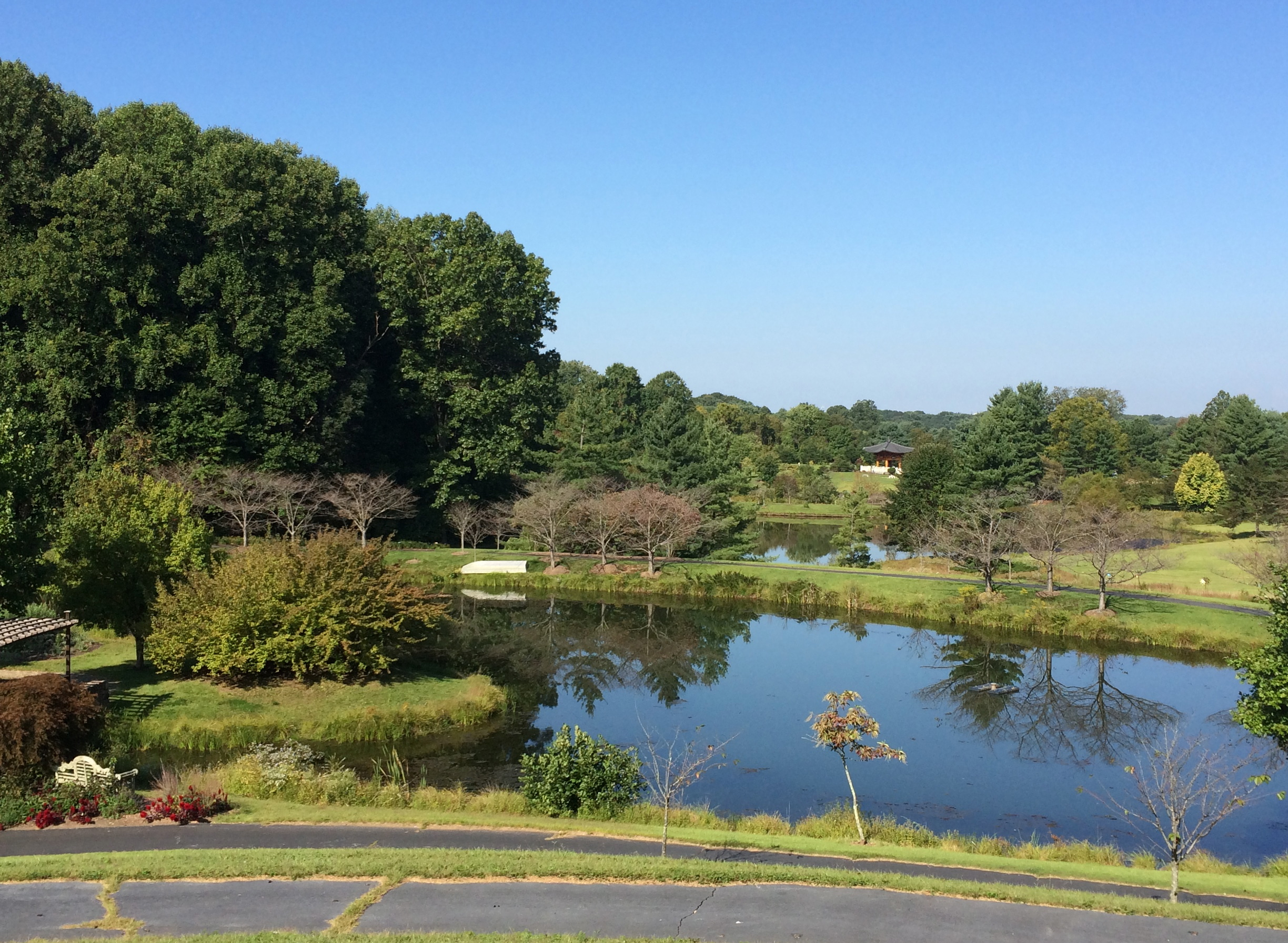
Lake Gardiner viewed from the spiral mound

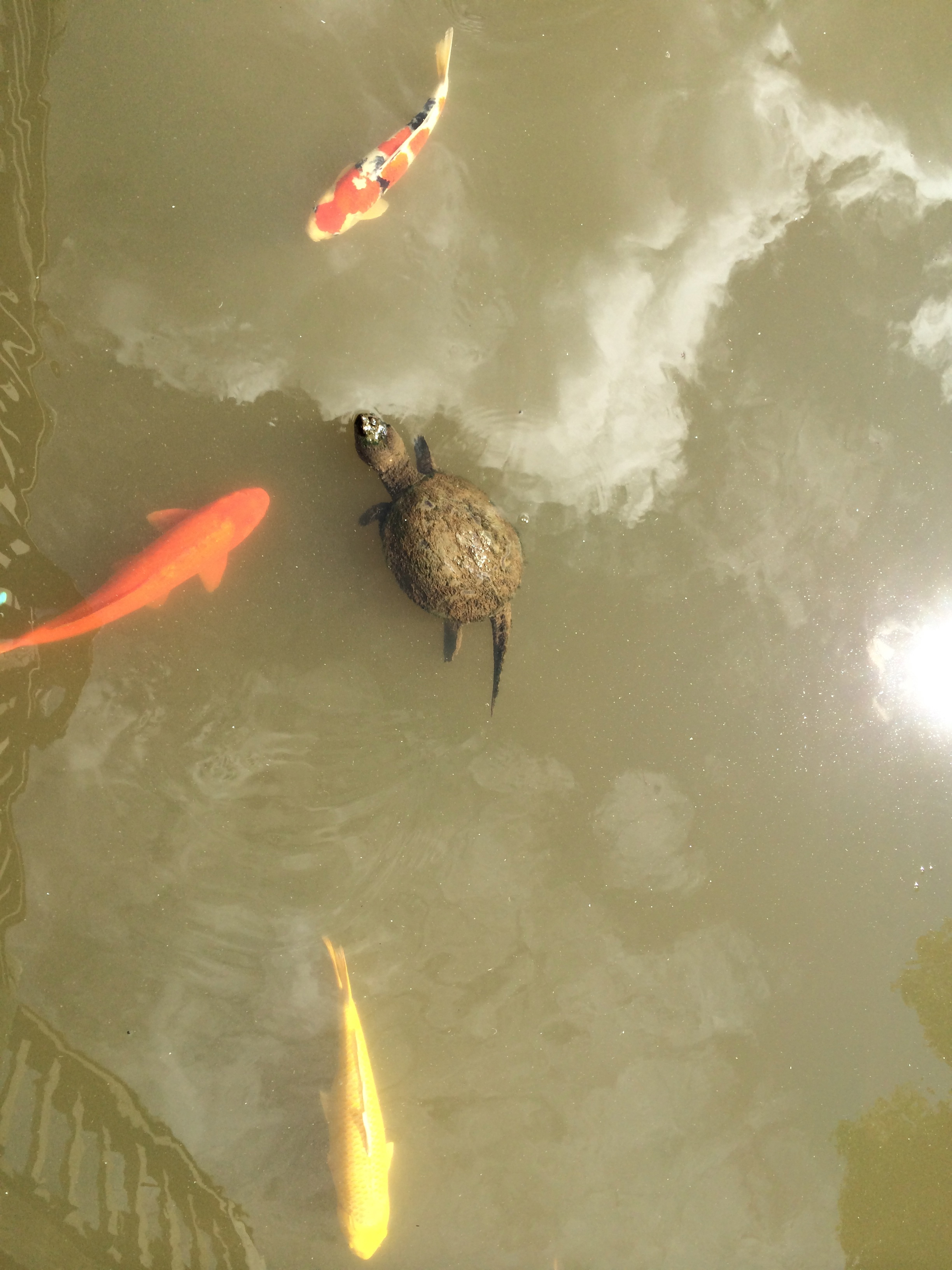
Mossy-backed turtle and koi in Lake Caroline

== See also ==
- Botanical gardens in Virginia
- List of botanical gardens in the United States
- NOVA Parks system
