= Potomac Appalachian Trail Club =

Hiking club

The Potomac Appalachian Trail Club (PATC) is a volunteer organization that works to maintain hiking trails in the Washington, D.C. area of the United States. PATC was founded in 1927 to protect and develop the local section of the then new Appalachian Trail. It has expanded its mission to oversee over 1,050 miles (1,690 km) of trails, 47 shelters and 39 cabins in Virginia, Maryland, West Virginia, Pennsylvania, and Washington, D.C.

== Appalachian Trail ==
PATC maintains 240 miles (390 km) of the Appalachian Trail, allocated to PATC by the Appalachian Trail Conservancy, which manages all day-to-day trail and land management activities under agreement with the National Park Service. PATC's area of responsibility begins at the southern end of Shenandoah National Park in Virginia and reaches north to Pine Grove Furnace in Pennsylvania. General trail maintenance is the responsibility of volunteer trail overseers, while trail construction and repair from serious damage, as well as larger projects, are managed by volunteer work crews, such as the Blue and White Crew.

== Other trails ==
In addition to its Appalachian Trail responsibilities, PATC also maintains several hundred miles of trails in Virginia, West Virginia, the District of Columbia, Maryland, and Pennsylvania. These trails are found in state and national parks, national forests, and occasionally through land held by municipalities, private owners, or the club itself. One such trail is the 252-mile (406 km) Tuscarora Trail. Other examples are the 71-mile (114 km) Massanutten Trail, the 17-mile (27 km) Bull Run-Occoquan Trail, and the trails in the Great North Mountain area that lead to the Big Schloss peak.

== Other activities ==
The club also has separate sections for climbing and mountaineering, ski touring, wilderness search and rescue (SMRG/ASRC), and trail patrol. PATC operates a number of primitive cabins for rent to members and non-members (one such cabin is Corbin Cabin). In addition, the club publishes maps and guidebooks for the Appalachian Trail and other trails the club maintains, publishes a monthly newsletter, the Potomac Appalachian, and organizes hikes throughout the club's area of operations.
