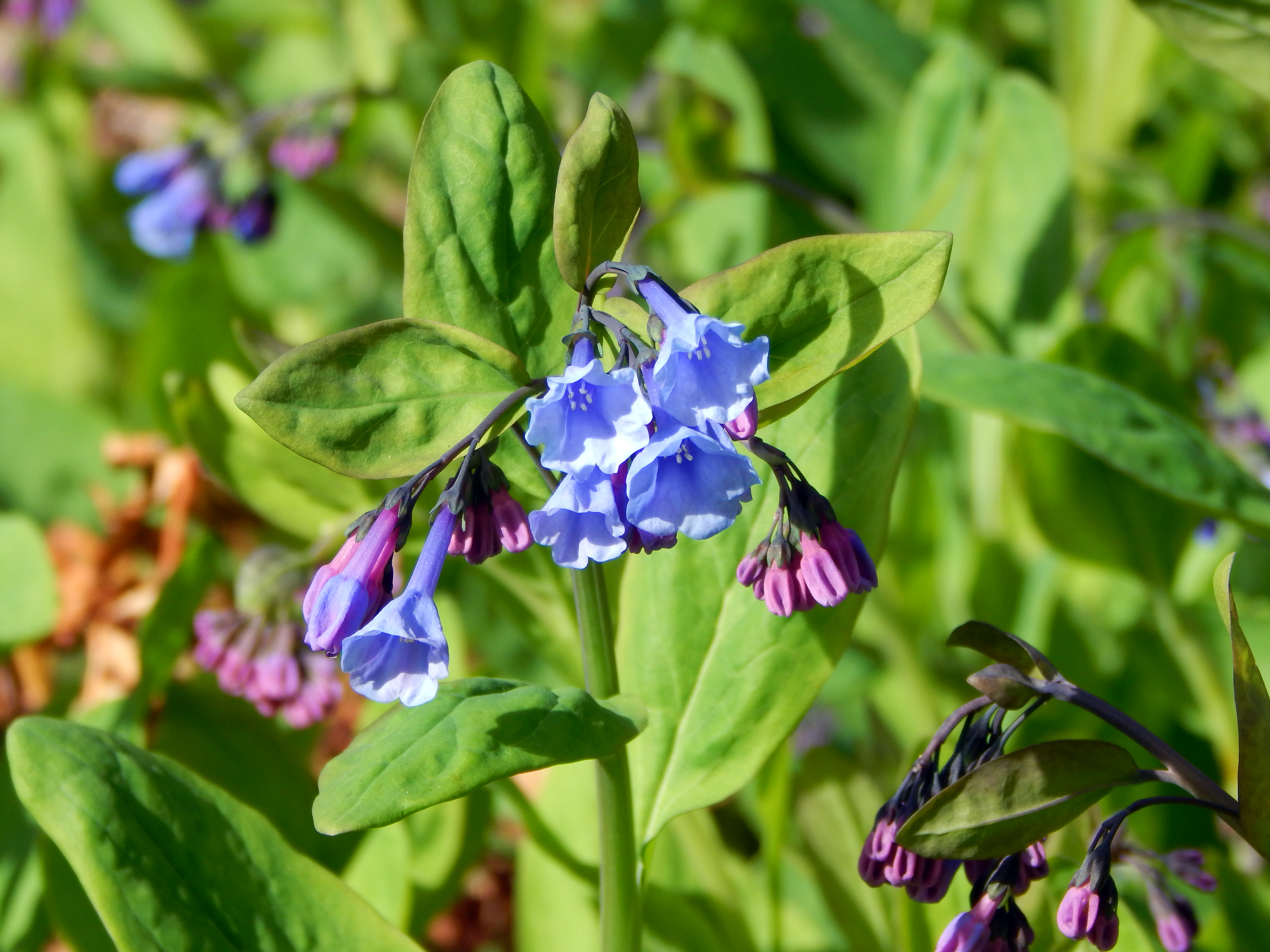

Scientific classification
- Kingdom: Plantae
- Clade: Tracheophytes
- Clade: Angiosperms
- Clade: Eudicots
- Clade: Asterids
- Order: Boraginales
- Family: Boraginaceae
- Genus: Mertensia
- Species: M. virginica

Binomial name
- Mertensia virginica (L.) Pers. ex Link, 1829

= Mertensia virginica =

Virginia bluebells

Species of flowering plant

Mertensia virginica (common names Virginia bluebells, Virginia cowslip, lungwort oysterleaf, Roanoke bells) is a spring ephemeral plant in the Boraginaceae (borage) family with bell-shaped sky-blue flowers, native to eastern North America.

== Description ==
Virginia bluebells have rounded (ovate) and gray-green leaves, borne on stems up to 24 in (60 cm) tall. The leaves are up to 5 in (13 cm) long, smooth (entire) along their margins, petiolate at the bottom of the flower stem, and sessile at the top.

The inflorescence is a nodding group, or cyme of flowers located at the end of the arched stems. The flower buds are pink, and the opened flowers are usually light blue, but occasionally pink and rarely white. The flowers have 5 shallow lobes fused into a tube at the base of the flower, five stamens, and a central pistil (carpel).

== Distribution and habitat ==
M. virginica is native in the United States from Kansas in the west, to Mississippi, Alabama, and Georgia in the south, and to Maine in the northeast. It is native in Canada in Ontario and Quebec. The plant can be found in rich, moist woods and on low, wooded hillsides. They often form large groups.

== Ecology ==
The plant develops very early in the spring and flowers mid-spring. In early summer, each fertilized flower produces four seeds within wrinkled nuts. The plant then goes dormant till the next spring.

The flowers attract long-tongued bees like bumblebees, and also butterflies, moths, skippers, hummingbird moths, flower flies, bee flies, and hummingbirds.

== Uses ==
Virginia bluebells had several uses in traditional Native American medicine, including as a pulmonary aid, tuberculosis treatment, and treatment for whooping cough (Cherokee), root infusion antidote for treating poison, and root decoction to treat venereal issues (Iroquois). Native Americans believed a tonic made from this plant could help heal those who were under-the-weather.

Mertensia virginica is edible, including the flowers.

In cultivation, M. virginica has gained the Royal Horticultural Society's Award of Garden Merit.

Photos

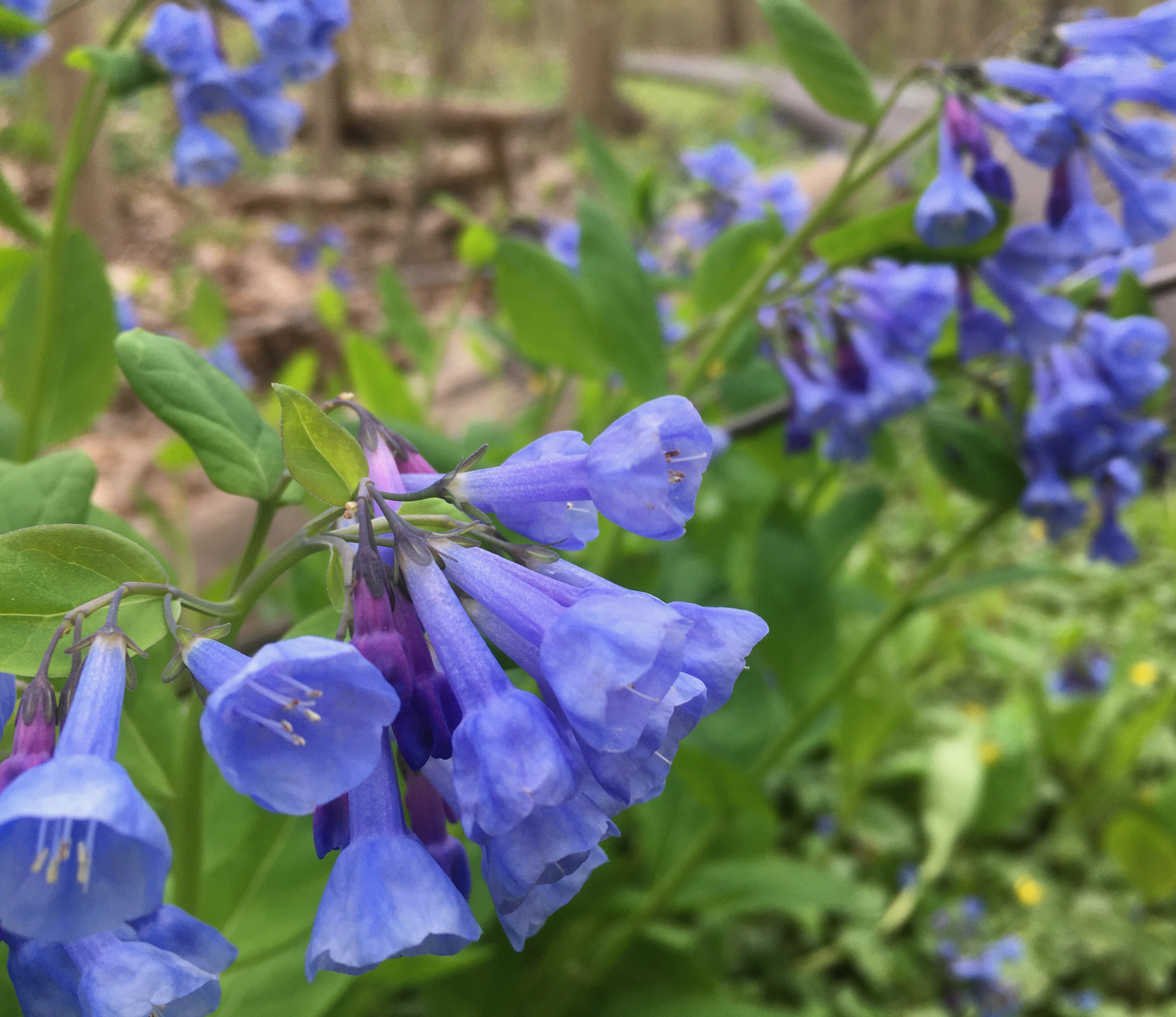
Virginia Bluebells (Mertensia virginica) in Ohio

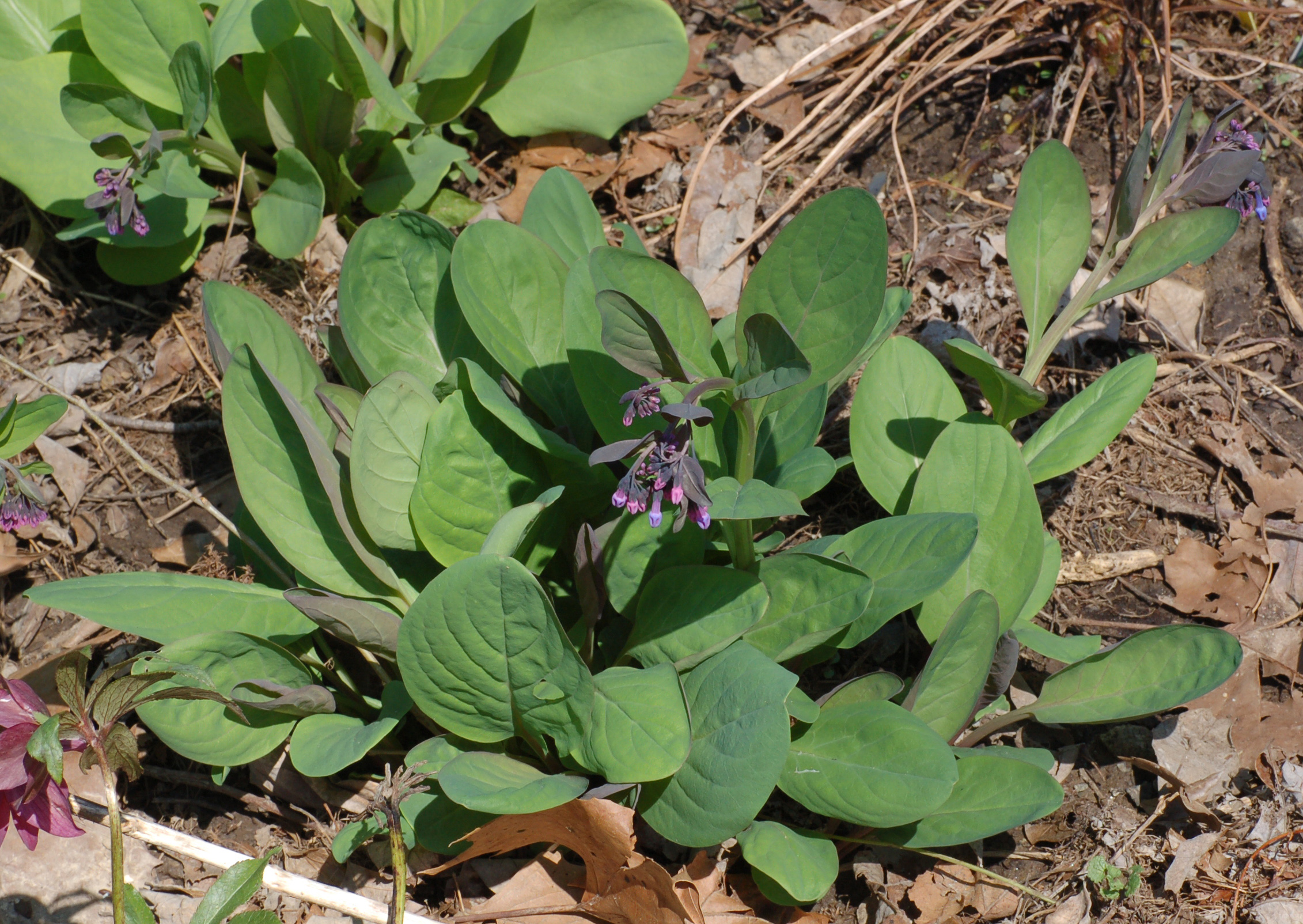
Leaves before blooming

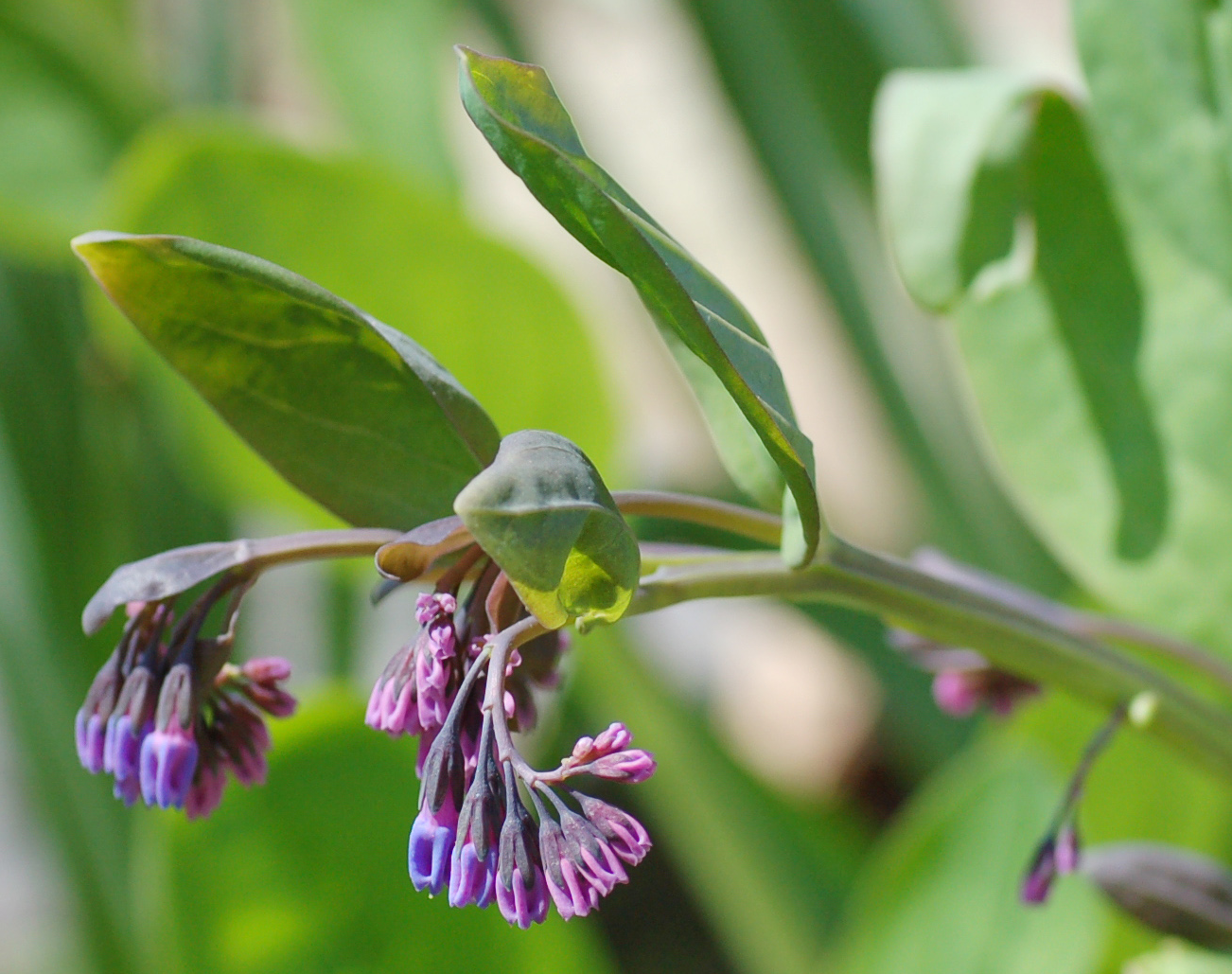
Flower buds

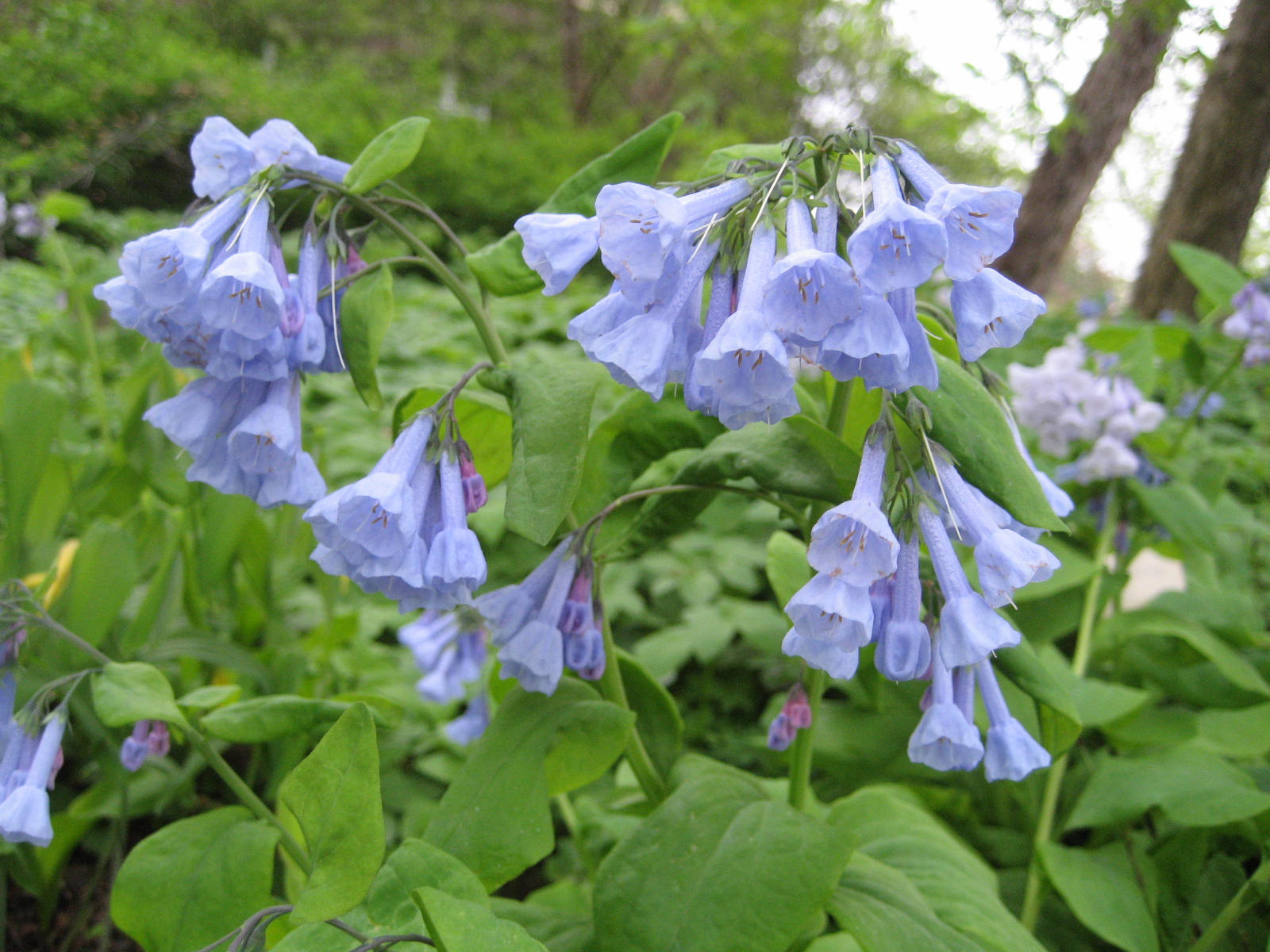
Typical blue-flowered form at the botanical gardens in Berlin, Germany

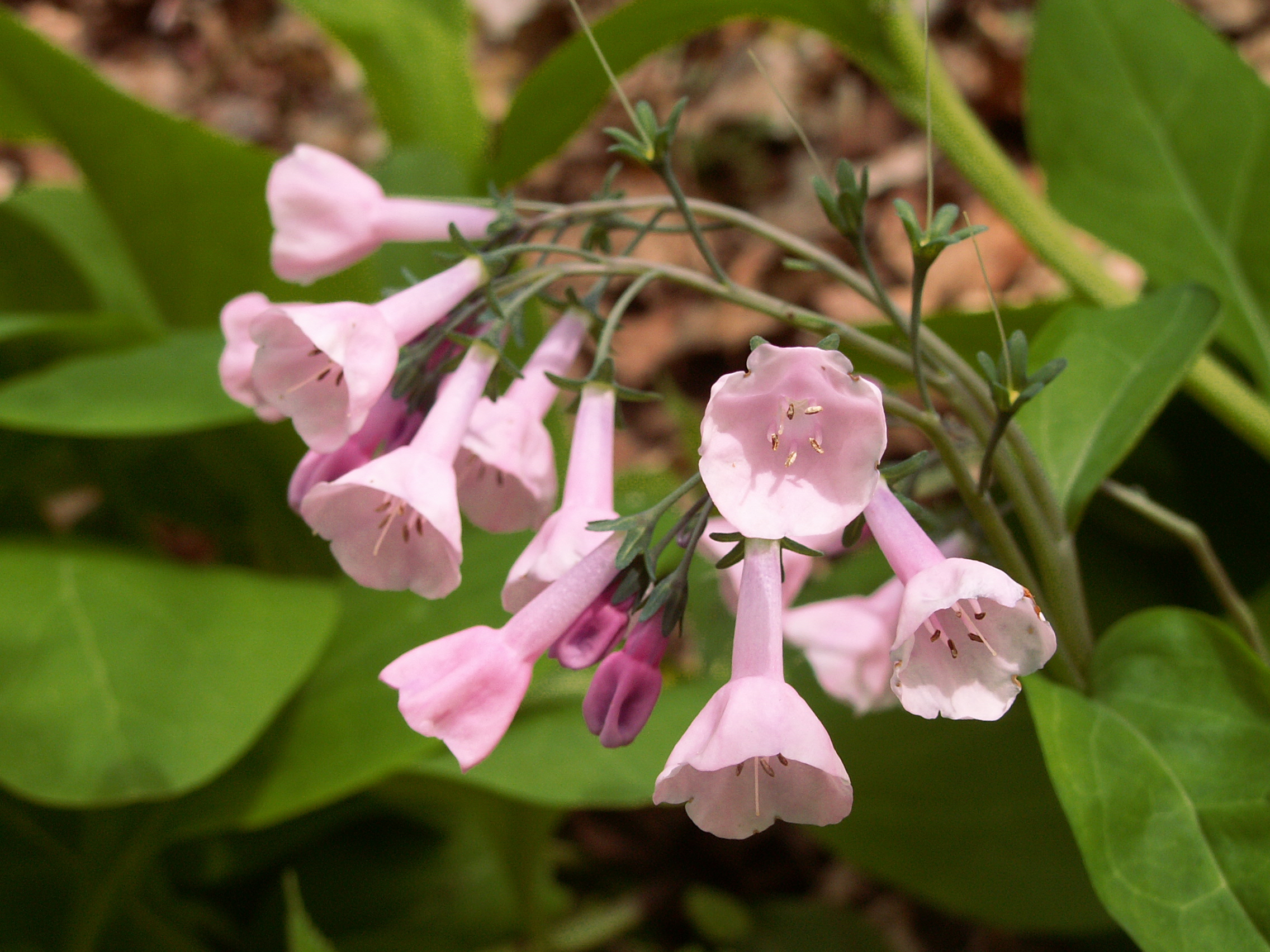
A pink-flowered form

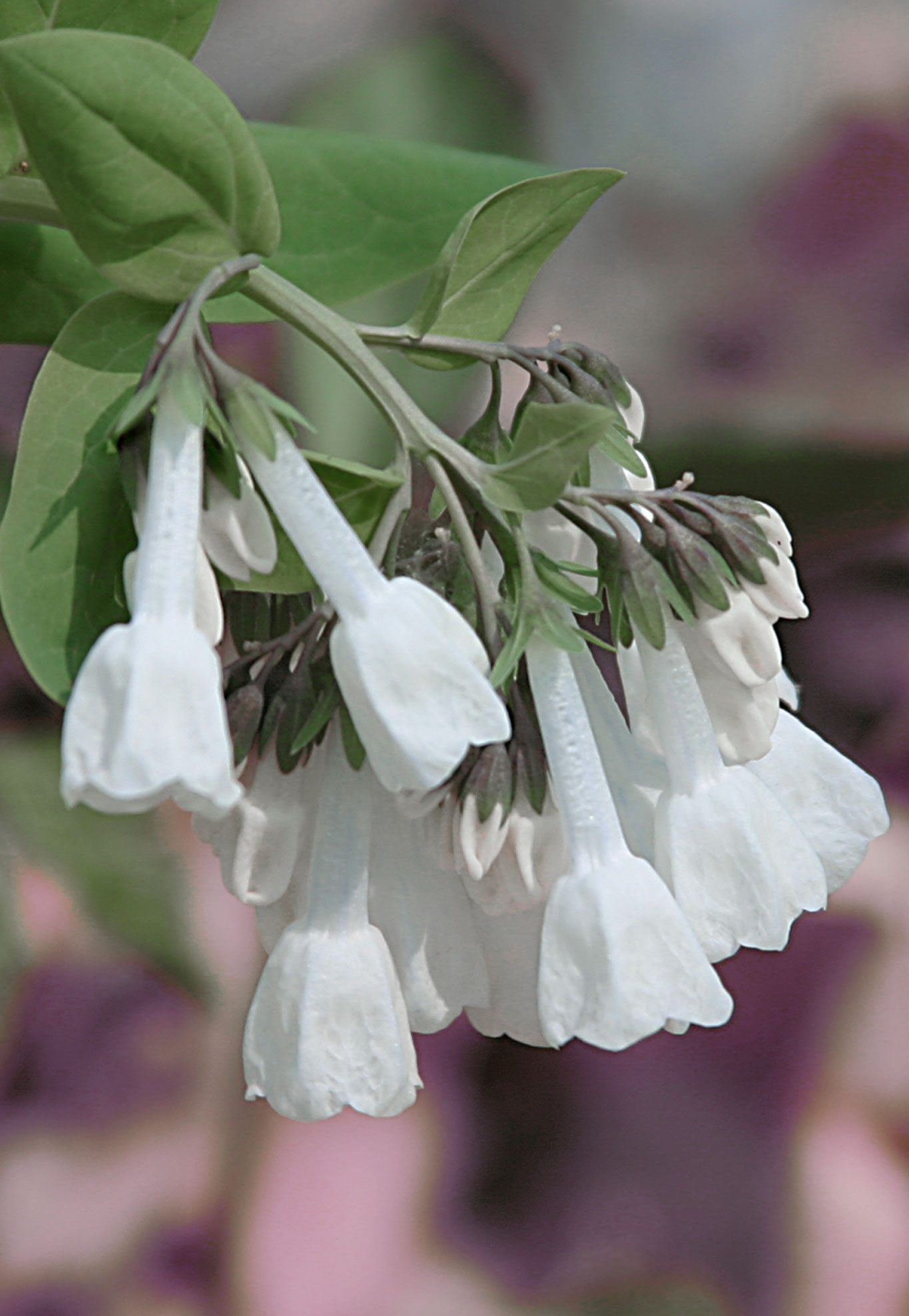
A white-flowered form

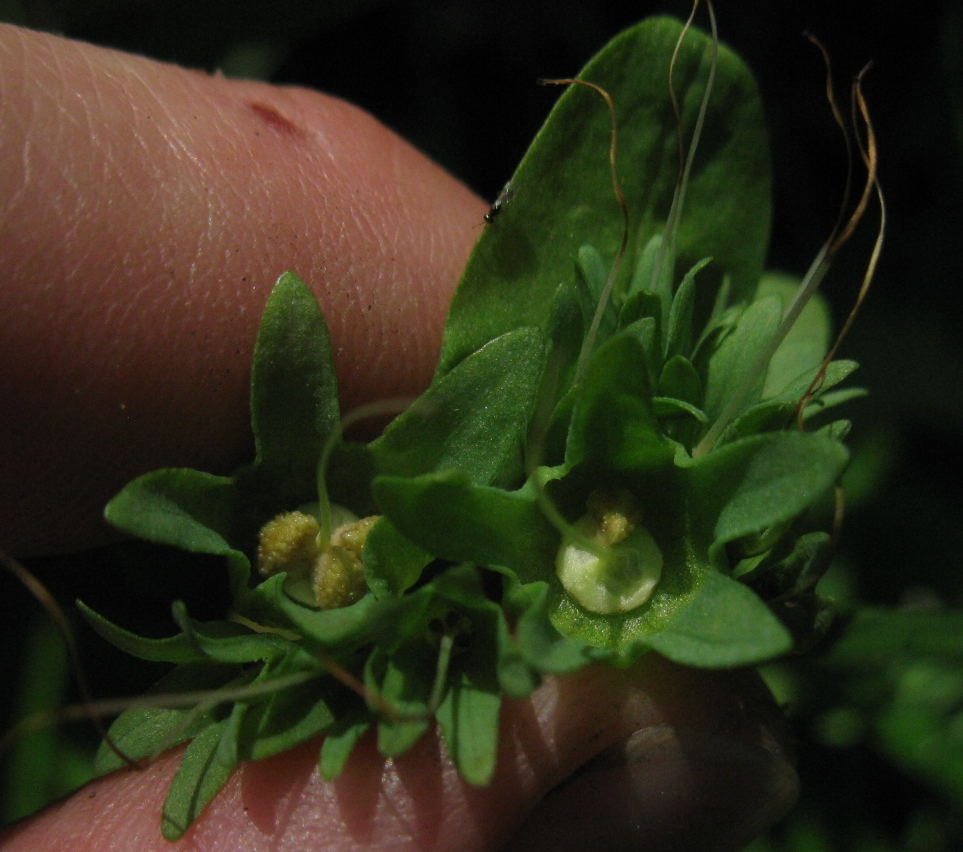
Fruits

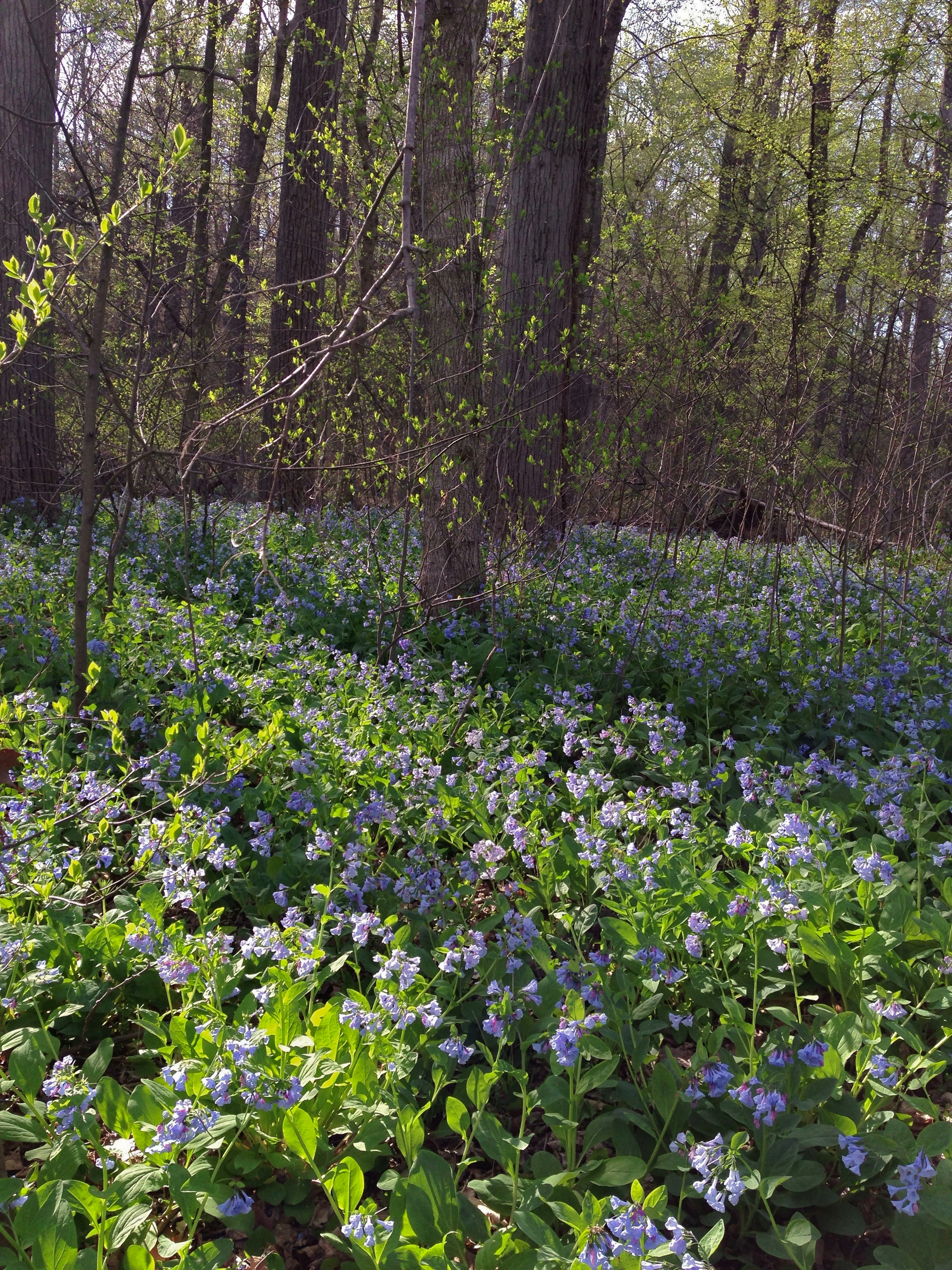
Woods carpeted in bluebells

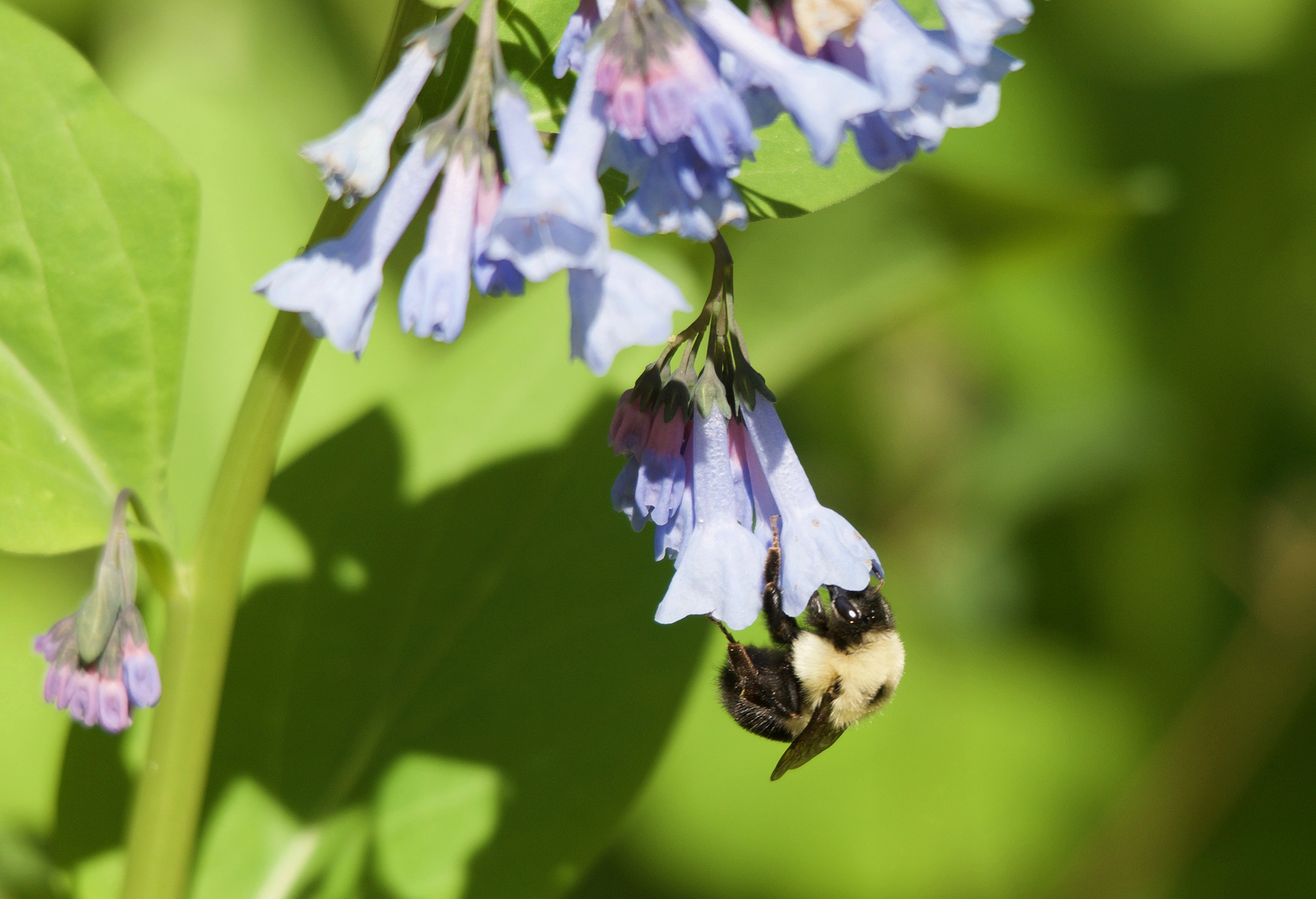
A bumblebee hanging from a bluebell

== Nomenclature ==
Mertensia virginica is the type species for the genus Mertensia and was first described by Linnaeus in 1753 as Pulmonaria virginica. The genus Pulmonaria is today restricted to 19 species in the tribe Boragineae. When Albrecht Wilhelm Roth erected the genus Mertensia in 1797, he named the Virginia bluebell as Mertensia pulmonarioides, apparently unaware that Linnaeus had already named it in his Species Plantarum. Roth's name is a superfluous synonym and has been used in recent literature.
