= Bull Run (Occoquan River tributary) =

Bull Run Tributary to Occoquan River
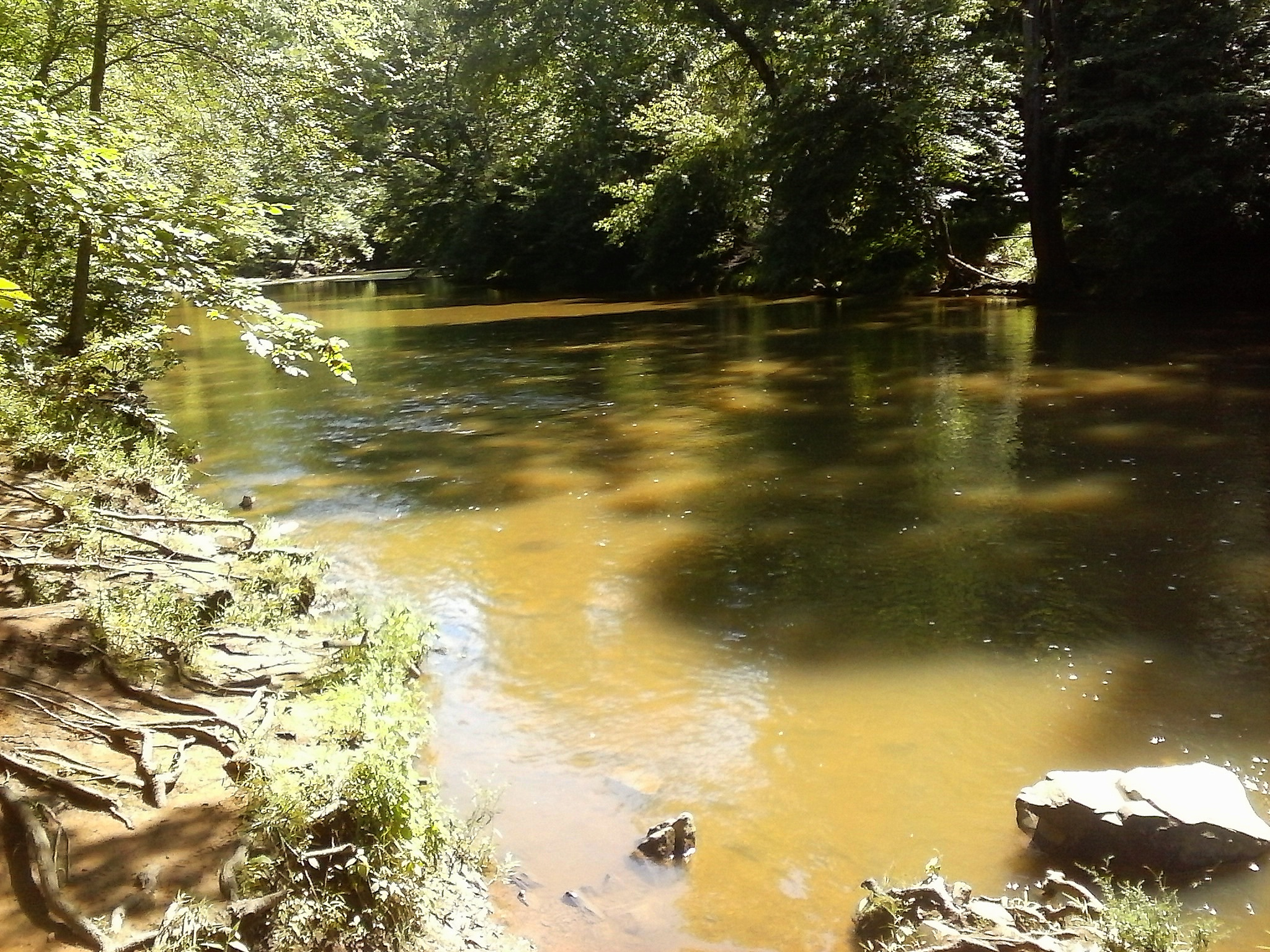

Location
- Country: United States
- State: Virginia
- County: Fairfax; Prince William; Loudoun

Physical characteristics
- Source: Hungry Run divide
  - location: Cold Spring Gap
  - coordinates: 38°56′21″N 077°39′11″W
  - elevation: 660 ft (200 m)
- Mouth: Occoquan River
  - location: about 1 mile northeast of Ravenwood, Virginia
  - coordinates: 38°43′21″N 077°22′51″W
  - elevation: 120 ft (37 m)
- Length: 31.80 mi (51.18 km)
- Basin size: 193.89 square miles (502.2 km^{2})
- Discharge
  - location: Occoquan River
  - average: 229.13 cu ft/s (6.488 m^{3}/s) at mouth with Occoquan River

Basin features
- Progression: southeast
- River system: Potomac River
- Tributaries
  - left: Foley Branch, Cub Run, Little Rocky Run, Johnny Moore Creek, Popes Head Creek, Old Mill Branch
  - right: Black Branch, Chestnut Lick, Bull Run tributary, Little Bull Run, Youngs Branch, Holkums Branch, Flat Branch, Russia Branch, Buckhall Branch
- Bridges: Loudoun Drive, New Road, US 15, Peach Orchard Lane, Auburn Farm Road, Gum Spring Road, US 29, I-66, Old Centerville Road, VA 28, VA 612

Bull Run is a 31.8-mile-long (51.2 km) tributary of the Occoquan River that originates from a spring in the Bull Run Mountains in Loudoun County, Virginia, and flows south to the Occoquan River. Bull Run serves as the boundary between Loudoun County and Prince William County, and between Fairfax County and Prince William County.

Bull Run is primarily associated with two battles of the American Civil War: the First Battle of Bull Run (July 21, 1861) and the Second Battle of Bull Run (August 28–30, 1862), both Confederate victories. A narrow part of the creek called Yates Ford (near Manassas) is the scene of the Battle of Occoquan, and downstream about one mile is the current Yates Ford Road bridge between Fairfax and Prince William counties.

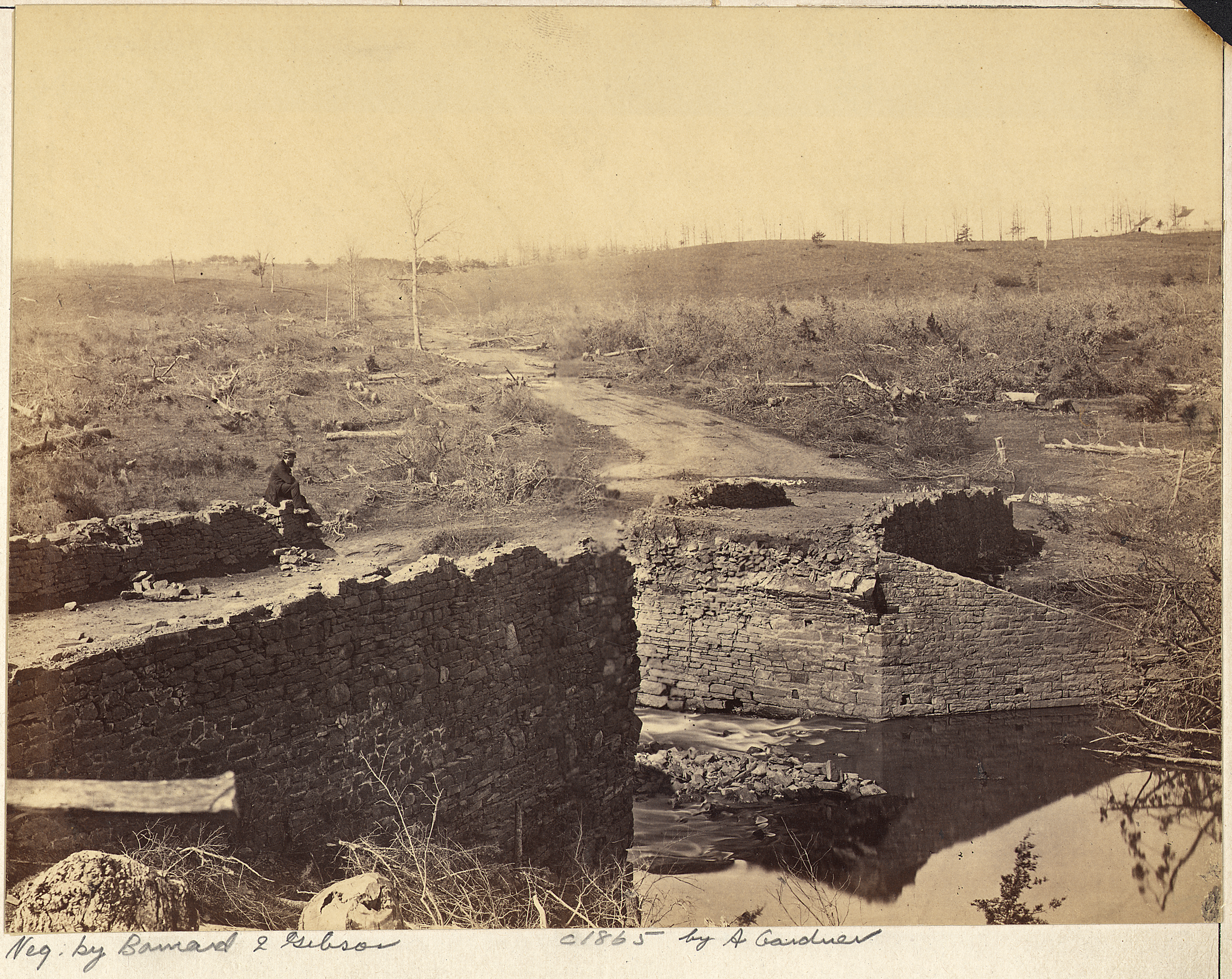
The ruins of the stone bridge over Bull Run, after the Second Battle of Bull Run, 1862, photographer unknown, from the National Archives and Records Administration

== See also ==
- List of rivers of Virginia
