= List of former Amtrak stations =

Amtrak, officially the National Railroad Passenger Corporation, is a quasi-public entity that operates passenger train services in the United States. Since its inception in 1971, it has had several route changes, contractions, and station replacements that resulted in the closure of older stations.

== Closed stations ==
Station	Location	Lines	Opened	Rebuilt	Agency closed	Station closed	Notes
52nd Street	Philadelphia, Pennsylvania	Silverliner Service	—	—	—	1980	The station burned down on August 16, 1980, and was never reopened by Amtrak or SEPTA. The station was razed in 1995.
Akron	Akron, Colorado	California Zephyr (1983–1987) Denver Zephyr (1971–1973) Desert Wind (1979–1987) Pioneer (1977–1987) San Francisco Zephyr (1972–1983)	—	—	—	1987	The station at Akron was discontinued on April 5, 1987.
Akron (AKO)	Akron, Ohio	Broadway Limited (1990–1995) Three Rivers (1998–2005)	1990	1998	—	2005	The station was closed after the discontinuance of the Broadway Limited on September 10, 1995. Service on the Three Rivers did not start until August 10, 1998. The Three Rivers was discontinued on March 7, 2005.
Alhambra	Alhambra, California	Sunset Limited (1971–1975)	1873	1940	—	1975	The station was discontinued in 1975 due to low patronage. The station burned down in the 1980s.
Amherst (AMM)	Amherst, Massachusetts	Montrealer (1972–1995) Vermonter (1995–2014)	—	—	—	2014	The station closed when Amtrak rerouted the Vermonter via the Connecticut River Line on December 29, 2014.
Arkansas City	Arkansas City, Kansas	Lone Star	—	—	—	1979	The station was closed after the discontinuance of the Lone Star in October 1979.
Athens	Athens, Ohio	Shenandoah	1976	—	—	1981	The station closed with the discontinued Shenandoah on September 30, 1981.
Atlantic City (ACY)	Atlantic City, New Jersey	Atlantic City Express	1989	—	—	1995	Amtrak discontinued service to Atlantic City when the Atlantic City Express ended on April 1, 1995. Connections are available to New Jersey Transit's Atlantic City Line.
Attleboro	Attleboro, Massachusetts	Cape Codder	1986	—	—	1989	The station closed before the 1989 season due to lack of ridership. The station is currently served by the MBTA Providence Line.
Aurora	Aurora, Illinois	California Zephyr Illinois Zephyr	—	—	—	1985	The station was discontinued in 1985. Connections were available to Metra, which moved to a new station in 1986.
Baker City (BAK)	Baker City, Oregon	Pioneer	1977	—	—	1997	The station closed with the discontinued Pioneer on May 11, 1997.
Batavia	Batavia, New York	Train 71	—	—	—	1971	
Batesville (BTS)	Batesville, Mississippi	City of New Orleans (1981–1995) Panama Limited (1971–1981)	—	—	—	1995	The station closed when the City of New Orleans was rerouted via Yazoo City and Greenwood in 1995.
Bay Minette (BAY)	Bay Minette, Alabama	Gulf Breeze (1989–1995)	1989	—	—	1995	The station closed when the Gulf Breeze was discontinued on April 1, 1995.
Bedford	Bedford, Virginia	Hilltopper (1977–1979) Mountaineer (1975–1977)	1975	—	—	1979	The station closed with the discontinued Hilltopper on September 30, 1979.
Belleville	Belleville, Illinois	River Cities	1985	—	—	1993	Belleville station opened on April 29, 1985. The station closed with the discontinued River Cities on November 4, 1993.
Bellingham	Bellingham, Washington	Pacific International	1972	—	—	1981	
Bellville Yard	Bellville, Texas	Texas Chief (1971–1972)	—	—	—	1972	The original station in Bellville was closed sometime in the 60's, and service moved to the crew change facility in the yard.
Berwyn	Berwyn, Pennsylvania	Silverliner Service	—	—	—	1980	Amtrak closed the station in October 1980. The station is currently served by SEPTA's Paoli/Thorndale Line.
Billings	Billings, Montana	North Coast Hiawatha	—	—	—	1979	The station closed when the North Coast Hiawatha was discontinued on September 29, 1979.
Birmingham	Birmingham, Michigan	Wolverine	—	—	—	2014	The station closed on October 13, 2014, and replaced by the station down the tracks in Troy.
Bismarck	Bismarck, North Dakota	North Coast Hiawatha	—	—	—	1979	The station closed when the North Coast Hiawatha was discontinued on September 29, 1979.
Blaine	Blaine, Washington	Pacific International	—	—	—	1981	The station closed with the discontinued Pacific International on September 30, 1981.
Bloomington	Bloomington, Indiana	Floridian (1971–1979) South Wind (1971)	—	—	—	1979	The station closed with the discontinued Floridian on October 6, 1979.
Bluefield	Bluefield, West Virginia	Hilltopper (1977–1979) Mountaineer (1977–1979)	1975	—	—	1979	The station closed with the discontinued Hilltopper on September 30, 1979.
Boise (BOI)	Boise, Idaho	Pioneer	1977	—	—	1997	The station closed with the discontinued Pioneer on May 11, 1997.
Bond	Bond, Colorado	California Zephyr	—	—	—	1983	The station at Bond was discontinued on October 30, 1983.
Borie (West Cheyenne)	Borie, Wyoming	San Francisco Zephyr (1979–1983) Pioneer (1991–1997)	1979	1991	1993	1997	The station closed with the discontinued Pioneer on May 11, 1997.
Bowie	Bowie, Maryland	Chesapeake	1978	—	—	1983	The station was discontinued with the end of the Chespeake in October 1983. Area is now served by MARC Train's Penn Line.
Bowling Green	Bowling Green, Kentucky	Floridian (1971–1979) South Wind (1971)	—	—	—	1979	The station closed with the discontinued Floridian on October 6, 1979.
Bozeman	Bozeman, Montana	North Coast Hiawatha	—	—	—	1979	The station closed when the North Coast Hiawatha was discontinued on September 29, 1979.
Brampton (BRT)	Brampton, Ontario	International	1990	—	—	2004	The station closed with the discontinuance of the International on April 23, 2004. Connections were available to GO Transit and VIA Rail.
Branford	Branford, Connecticut	Beacon Hill	—	—	—	1979	The station closed in October 1979.
Brantford (BTF)	Brantford, Ontario	International	1982	—	—	1990	The station closed with the rerouting of the International in January 1990. Connections were available to VIA Rail.
Breckenridge	Breckenridge, Minnesota	Empire Builder	—	—	—	1979	The station closed with the rerouted Empire Builder via St. Cloud in October 1979.
Brenham	Brenham, Texas	Inter-American	1973	—	—	1981	The station closed with the discontinued Inter-American on September 30, 1981.
Brewton (BTA)	Brewton, Alabama	Gulf Breeze (1989–1995)	1991	—	—	1995	The station closed when the Gulf Breeze was discontinued on April 1, 1995.
Brigham City	Brigham City, Utah	Pioneer	1977	—	—	1981	The station closed on April 26, 1981.
Bristol	Bristol, Pennsylvania	Northeast Services	1971	—	—	—	The station is currently served by the SEPTA Trenton Line.
Brunswick	Brunswick, Maryland	Blue Ridge (1973–1986) Shenandoah (1976–1978)	1973	—	—	1986	The station was discontinued with the end of the Blue Ridge in October 1986. Brunswick station is currently served by MARC Train's Brunswick Line.
Buffalo–Central Terminal	Buffalo, New York	Lake Shore (1971–1972) Niagara Rainbow (1971–1979)	1929	—	—	1979	The station closed when the new station in Depew opened on October 28, 1979.
Bryn Mawr	Bryn Mawr, Pennsylvania	Keystone Service	—	—	—	1988	Amtrak closed the station in May 1988. The station is currently served by SEPTA's Paoli/Thorndale Line.
Burlington	Burlington, Ontario	International Maple Leaf	1989	—	—	1992	The station closed on May 25, 1992, and replaced by Aldershot. Connections were available to GO Transit and VIA Rail.
Burlington West	Burlington, Ontario	International Maple Leaf	—	—	—	1989	The station was replaced in May 1989 and replaced by the Burlington GO station. Connections were available to VIA Rail.
Butte	Butte, Montana	North Coast Hiawatha	—	—	—	1979	The station closed when the North Coast Hiawatha was discontinued on September 29, 1979.
Buzzards Bay (BUZ)	Buzzards Bay, Massachusetts	Cape Codder	1986	—	—	1996	The station closed with the discontinued Cape Codder after the 1996 season due to low ridership. The station is currently served by the Cape Cod Central Railroad and the seasonal CapeFlyer service.
Cache Junction	Cache Junction, Utah	Pioneer	1981	—	—	1988	Amtrak opened the station at Cache Junction on April 26, 1981, and used a passenger shelter from Brigham City station to serve as a shelter. The station closed on September 18, 1988.
Cairo	Cairo, Illinois	City of New Orleans (1981–1987) Panama Limited (1971–1981)	—	—	—	1987	The station closed on October 25, 1987.
Caliente (CIE)	Caliente, Nevada	Desert Wind	—	—	—	1997	The station closed with the discontinued Desert Wind on May 12, 1997.
Cambridge	Cambridge, Minnesota	North Star	1975	—	—	1985	The station closed when Amtrak discontinued the North Star on April 7, 1985.
Canton	Canton, Mississippi	City of New Orleans (1981–1995) Panama Limited (1971–1981) River Cities (1984–1993)	—	—	—	1995	The station closed when the City of New Orleans was rerouted via Yazoo City and Greenwood in 1995.
Canton–Akron (CAN)	Canton, Ohio	Broadway Limited (1971–1990) Capitol Limited (1971–1990)	—	1978	—	1990	Amtrak Standard Station replaced the Pennsylvania Railroad statition in the same location; the station closed with the rerouted Broadway Limited and Capitol Limited on November 11, 1990.
Capital Beltway	Lanham, Maryland	Chesapeake (1978–1983) Metroliner Night Owl	1970	—	—	1983	Capital Beltway station closed when Amtrak moved services to New Carrollton station.
Carlin	Carlin, Nevada	California Zephyr (1983) Denver Zephyr (1971–1973) San Francisco Zephyr (1972–1983)	—	—	—	1983	The station at Carlin was discontinued on October 30, 1983.
Carlsbad Village (CBV)	Carlsbad, California	Pacific Surfliner (2013–2018) San Diegan (1995–2000)	—	—	—	2018	Connections were available to COASTER, which continues to service the station.
Carlsbad Poinsettia (POI)	Carlsbad, California	Pacific Surfliner (2013–2017) San Diegan (1995–2000)	1995	—	—	2017	Connections were available to COASTER, which continues to service the station.
Carrollton	Carrollton, Missouri	Lone Star	1973	—	—	1979	The station was closed after the discontinuance of the Lone Star in October 1979.
Cascade Locks	Cascade Locks, Oregon	Pioneer	1981	—	—	1988	Cascade Locks station opened with a ribbon cutting ceremony on April 26, 1981. The station closed on September 18, 1988.
Catlettsburg–Tri-State Station (CAT)	Catlettsburg, Kentucky	Cardinal (1977–1998) George Washington (1975–1976) Hilltopper (1977–1979) James Whitcomb Riley (1975–1977) Mountaineer (1977–1979)	1975	—	—	1998	The station closed on March 11, 1998, and replaced with a stop in nearby Ashland.
Chelsea	Chelsea, Michigan	Michigan Executive (1975–1982)	—	—	—	1982	The station closed in October 1982.
Cherry Hill (CRH)	Cherry Hill, New Jersey	Atlantic City Express	1994	—	—	1995	Amtrak discontinued service to Cherry Hill when the Atlantic City Express ended on April 1, 1995. Connections were available to New Jersey Transit's Atlantic City Line.
Chester	Chester, Pennsylvania	Chesapeake	1978	—	—	1983	The station was discontinued with the end of the Chespeake in October 1983. Chester station is currently served by SEPTA's Wilmington/Newark Line.
Cheyenne	Cheyenne, Wyoming	City of San Francisco (1971–1972) San Francisco Zephyr (1972–1979)	—	—	—	1979	The station closed and replaced by the West Cheyenne–Borie station.
Chicago–Central Station	Chicago, Illinois	Campus (1971–1972); Panama Limited (1971–1972) Shawnee (1971–1972)	—	—	—	1972	The station closed on March 6, 1972, when services were consolidated to Chicago Union Station.
Chillicothe (CIA)	Chillicothe, Illinois	Southwest Chief (1984–1996)	—	—	—	1996	The station closed when the Southwest Chief was rerouted via the Burlington Northern Santa Fe Railway tracks.
Chillicothe	Chillicothe, Ohio	Shenandoah	1976	—	—	1981	The station closed with the discontinued Shenandoah on September 30, 1981.
Christiansburg	Christiansburg, Virginia	Hilltopper (1977–1979) Mountaineer (1977–1979)	1975	—	—	1979	The station closed with the discontinued Hilltopper on September 30, 1979.
Cincinnati–River Road	Cincinnati, Ohio	Cardinal (1977–1991) George Washington (1972–1974) James Whitcomb Riley (1972–1977) Mountaineer (1975–1977) Shenandoah (1976–1981)	1972	—	—	1991	The station closed when service in Cincinnati moved back to Cincinnati Union Terminal in 1991, the station it left on October 29, 1972.
Clarksburg	Clarksburg, West Virginia	Shenandoah	1976	—	—	1981	The station closed with the discontinued Shenandoah on September 30, 1981.
Clearwater	Clearwater, Florida	Champion (1971–1979) Floridian (1971–1979) South Wind (1971) Silver Meteor (1971–1984)	—	—	—	1984	The station closed with the truncation of the Silver Services on February 1, 1984.
Cleveland Union Terminal	Cleveland, Ohio	Lake Shore (1971–1972)	1930	—	—	1977	The Erie Lackawanna Railway continued serving Union Terminal until discontinued by Conrail in 1977.
Clinton	Clinton, Connecticut	Clamdigger	—	—	—	1978	Flag stop. The station closed when the Clamdigger was discontinued on April 28, 1978. Service at Madison is currently serviced by ConnDOT's Shore Line East.
College Station–Bryan (CLL)	College Station, Texas	Texas Eagle (1988–1995)	1988	—	—	1995	The station was closed after the discontinuance of the Texas Eagle between Dallas and Houston on September 10, 1995.
Colonie–Schenectady	Colonie, New York	Empire State Express Niagara Rainbow Salt City Express	1969	—	—	1979	Amtrak closed the station on September 9, 1979, after opening a new station in Schenectady.
Columbus	Columbus, Ohio	National Limited	—	—	—	1979	The station closed with the discontinued National Limited on October 1, 1979.
Commerce	Commerce, California	Orange County Commuter San Diegan	1993	—	—	1994	service commuted to Metrolink – served by the Orange County Line
Coolidge (CLG)	Coolidge, Arizona	Sunset Limited Texas Eagle	—	—	—	1996	The station closed after the Sunset Limited and Texas Eagle were rerouted via Maricopa on June 3, 1996.
Corsicana (COC)	Corsicana, Texas	Texas Eagle (1988–1995)	1988	—	—	1995	The station was closed after the discontinuance of the Texas Eagle between Dallas and Houston on September 10, 1995.
Crestline–Mansfield (CRS)	Crestline, Ohio	Broadway Limited (1971–1990) Capitol Limited (1971–1990)	1854	—	—	1990	Crestline's closed Union Station was razed on June 5, 1980. The station closed with the rerouted Broadway Limited and Capitol Limited on November 11, 1990.
Dade City (DDE)	Dade City, Florida	Palmetto (2002–2004) Silver Palm (1996–2002)	1996	—	—	2004	The station closed with the truncation of the Palmetto back to Savannah, Georgia.
Dayton	Dayton, Ohio	National Limited	—	—	—	1979	The station closed with the discontinued National Limited on October 1, 1979.
Decatur	Decatur, Alabama	Floridian (1971–1979) South Wind (1971)	—	—	—	1979	The station closed with the discontinued Floridian on October 6, 1979.
Decatur	Decatur, Illinois	Illini	1981	—	—	1983	Amtrak closed the station on July 10, 1983, after the Illini branch to Decatur was discontinued.
Deer Lodge	Deer Lodge, Montana	North Coast Hiawatha	—	—	—	1979	The station closed when the North Coast Hiawatha was discontinued on September 29, 1979.
Del Mar (DEL)	Del Mar, California	San Diegan	—	—	—	1995	Amtrak closed the station on February 6, 1995, and replaced it with Solana Beach station for service on COASTER, which opened on February 27, 1995.
Delta	Delta, Utah	Desert Wind	1983	—	—	1988	The station closed on September 18, 1988.
Detroit Michigan Central	Detroit, Michigan	Lake Cities Michigan Executive Turboliner Twilight Limited Wolverine	1914	—	—	1994	The station closed in 1994 and replaced by the current station.
Dickinson	Dickinson, North Dakota	North Coast Hiawatha	—	—	—	1979	The station closed when the North Coast Hiawatha was discontinued on September 29, 1979.
Dothan	Dothan, Alabama	Floridian (1971–1979) South Wind (1971)	—	—	—	1979	The station closed with the discontinued Floridian on October 6, 1979.
Dubuque	Dubuque, Iowa	Black Hawk	—	—	—	1981	The station closed when the Black Hawk was discontinued on September 30, 1981.
Duffields	Duffields, West Virginia	Shenandoah	1976	—	—	1981	Flag stop. The station closed with the discontinued Shenandoah on September 30, 1981. Duffields is currently served by MARC Train on its Brunswick Line.
Duluth (DUL)	Duluth, Minnesota	North Star	1975	—	—	1985	The station closed when Amtrak discontinued the North Star on April 7, 1985.
Durant (DUR)	Durant, Mississippi	City of New Orleans (1981–1995) Panama Limited (1971–1981) River Cities (1984–1993)	—	—	—	1995	The station closed when the City of New Orleans was rerouted via Yazoo City and Greenwood in 1995.
Dundas (DDS)	Dundas, Ontario	International	1982	—	—	1990	The station closed with the rerouting of the International in January 1990. Connections were available to VIA Rail.
Dyersburg	Dyersburg, Tennessee	City of New Orleans (1981–1992) Panama Limited (1971–1981)	—	—	—	1992	The station closed on April 6, 1992.
East Auburn	Auburn, Washington	Empire Builder	—	—	—	1981	The station closed with the rerouted Empire Builder on October 25, 1981.
East Dubuque	East Dubuque, Illinois	Black Hawk	—	—	—	1981	The station closed when the Black Hawk was discontinued on September 30, 1981.
East Greenwich	East Greenwich, Rhode Island	Beacon Hill (1978–1981) Night Owl (1972–1988)	—	—	—	1988	
East Lyme–Niantic	East Lyme, Connecticut	Beacon Hill	—	—	—	1981	The station closed when the Beacon Hill was discontinued on September 30, 1981.
East Milwaukie	Milwaukie, Oregon	Mount Rainier Willamette Valley	1980	—	—	1982	The station closed with the discontinued Willamette Valley on January 1, 1982.
East New Orleans	New Orleans, Louisiana	The Gulf Coast Limited	—	—	—	1985	Amtrak closed the station on January 6, 1985, after the Gulf Coast Limited was discontinued.
East Olympia	East Olympia, Washington	Coast Starlight Mount Rainier Pioneer	—	—	—	1990	The station was closed in 1990 when the Olympia–Lacey station opened.
Edgewood	Edgewood, Maryland	Chesapeake	1978	—	—	1983	The station was discontinued with the end of the Chespeake in October 1983. Edgewood station is currently served by MARC Train's Penn Line.
Edmondson Avenue	Baltimore, Maryland	Chesapeake	1979	—	—	1983	The station was discontinued with the end of the Chespeake in October 1983. West Baltimore station services customers a block south on the MARC Train Penn Line.
Elkton	Elkton, Maryland	Chesapeake	1978	—	—	1983	The station was discontinued with the end of the Chespeake in October 1983.
Ellensburg	Ellensburg, Washington	Empire Builder	—	—	—	1981	The station closed with the rerouted Empire Builder on October 25, 1981.
Elizabeth	Elizabeth, New Jersey	Northeast Services	—	—	—	1975	The station closed on October 26, 1975. Elizabeth station is currently served by New Jersey Transit's Northeast Corridor Line and North Jersey Coast Line.
Elmhurst	Elmhurst, Illinois	Black Hawk	—	—	—	1981	The station closed when the Black Hawk was discontinued on September 30, 1981.
Emporia (EMP)	Emporia, Kansas	Southwest Chief	—	—	—	1997	The station closed on May 11, 1997.
Encinitas (ENC)	Encinitas, California	Pacific Surfliner (2013–2017) San Diegan (1995–2000)	1995	—	—	2017	Connections were available to COASTER, who continues to service the station.
Enfield	Enfield, Connecticut	Fast Mail Merchants Limited Shoreliner Service Yankee Clipper	—	—	—	1986	The station closed on October 26, 1986, due to low ridership. It is scheduled to reopen as a CT Rail station in 2025.
Eureka	Eureka, Illinois	Prairie Marksman	1981	—	—	1981	The station closed with the discontinued Prairie Marksman on October 5, 1981.
Eutaw	Eutaw, Alabama	Crescent	—	—	—	1980	Eutaw station closed on October 26, 1980, due to low ridership.
Evanston (EVT)	Evanston, Wyoming	City of San Francisco (1971–1972) Pioneer (1991–1997) San Francisco Zephyr (1972–1983)	—	1991	—	1997	The station closed with the discontinued Pioneer on May 11, 1997.
Evergreen (EVE)	Evergreen, Alabama	Gulf Breeze (1989–1995)	1989	—	—	1995	The station closed when the Gulf Breeze was discontinued on April 1, 1995.
Fair Haven (FHV)	Fair Haven, Vermont	Ethan Allen Express	1997	—	—	2010	The station closed on January 9, 2010, and was replaced by the Castleton station.
Farmville	Farmville, Virginia	Hilltopper (1977–1979) Mountaineer (1977–1979)	1975	—	—	1979	The station closed with the discontinued Hilltopper on September 30, 1979.
Forsyth	Forsyth, Montana	North Coast Hiawatha	—	—	—	1979	The station closed when the North Coast Hiawatha was discontinued on September 29, 1979.
Fort Erie	Fort Erie, Ontario	Niagara Rainbow	—	—	—	1978	The station closed when the Niagara Rainbow was rerouted via Niagara Falls on October 29, 1978.
Fort Madison	Fort Madison, Iowa	Southwest Chief	1968	—	—	2021	The station closed when service was moved to the Atchison, Topeka and Santa Fe Passenger and Freight Complex.
Fort Wayne (FWA)	Fort Wayne, Indiana	Broadway Limited (1971–1990) Capitol Limited (1971–1990)	—	—	—	1990	The station closed with the rerouted Broadway Limited and Capitol Limited on November 11, 1990.
Fort Worth–Santa Fe Depot	Fort Worth, Texas	Inter-American Texas Eagle	—	—	—	2002	The station closed when they moved Amtrak service to the Fort Worth ITC.
Fostoria (FOS)	Fostoria, Ohio	Broadway Limited (1990–1995) Three Rivers (1998–2005)	1990	1997	—	2005	The station was closed after the discontinuance of the Broadway Limited on September 10, 1995. Service on the Three Rivers did not start until December 15, 1997. The Three Rivers was discontinued on March 7, 2005.
Franconia–Springfield (FRS)	Springfield, Virginia	Northeast Regional	—	—	—	2010	Amtrak discontinued service on May 10, 2010, at Franconia–Springfield. Connections were available to Virginia Railway Express's Fredericksburg Line and the Washington Metro.
Freeport	Freeport, Illinois	Black Hawk	—	—	—	1981	The station closed when the Black Hawk was discontinued on September 30, 1981.
Gaithersburg	Gaithersburg, Maryland	Blue Ridge (1973–1986) Shenandoah (1976–1978)	1973	—	—	1986	The station was discontinued with the end of the Blue Ridge in October 1986. Gaithersburg station is currently served by MARC Train's Brunswick Line.
Galena	Galena, Illinois	Black Hawk	—	—	—	1981	The station closed when the Black Hawk was discontinued on September 30, 1981.
Galesburg North Broad Street (GBA)	Galesburg, Illinois	Southwest Chief (1984–1996)	—	—	—	1996	The station closed when the Southwest Chief was rerouted via the Burlington Northern Santa Fe Railway tracks.
Garrett (GIN)	Garrett, Indiana	Broadway Limited (1990–1995)	1990	—	—	1995	The station was closed after the discontinuance of the Broadway Limited on September 10, 1995.
Gary–5th and Chase (GRY)	Gary, Indiana	Calumet Broadway Limited (1971–1979) Capitol Limited (1980–1985)	—	—	—	1991	The station closed with the discontinued Calumet on May 3, 1991.
Gary–Broadway (GRB)	Gary, Indiana	Calumet	—	—	—	1991	The station closed with the discontinued Calumet on May 3, 1991.
Gary–Miller and Lake Streets	Gary, Indiana	Cardinal	—	—	—	1986	The station closed with the rerouted Cardinal on April 27, 1986.
Georgetown (GEO)	Georgetown, Ontario	International	1990	—	—	2004	The station closed with the discontinuance of the International on April 23, 2004. Connections were available to GO Transit and VIA Rail.
Gerber	Gerber, California	Coast Starlight	1971	—	—	1972	Gerber station closed on June 11, 1972.
Glendive	Glendive, Montana	North Coast Hiawatha	—	—	—	1979	The station closed when the North Coast Hiawatha was discontinued on September 29, 1979.
Greeley (GRE)	Greeley, Colorado	Pioneer (1991–1997) San Francisco Zephyr (1972–1983)	—	—	—	1997	The station closed with the discontinued Pioneer on May 11, 1997.
Greenfield Village (GFV)	Dearborn, Michigan	Wolverine	—	—	—	2014	The station closed when the new station in Dearborn was opened in December 2014.
Green River (GNR)	Green River, Wyoming	City of San Francisco (1971–1972) Pioneer (1991–1997) San Francisco Zephyr (1972–1983)	—	1991	—	1997	The station closed with the discontinued Pioneer on May 11, 1997.
Greenville (GVA)	Greenville, Alabama	Gulf Breeze (1989–1995)	1989	—	—	1995	The station closed when the Gulf Breeze was discontinued on April 1, 1995.
Grenada (GDA)	Grenada, Mississippi	City of New Orleans (1981–1995) Panama Limited (1971–1981) River Cities (1984–1993)	—	—	—	1995	The station closed when the City of New Orleans was rerouted via Yazoo City and Greenwood in 1995.
Groton	Groton, Connecticut	Clamdigger	—	—	—	1978	Flag stop. The station closed when the Clamdigger was discontinued on April 28, 1978.
Guelph (GUE)	Guelph, Ontario	International	1990	—	—	2004	The station closed with the discontinuance of the International on April 23, 2004. Connections were available to GO Transit and VIA Rail.
Guilford	Guilford, Connecticut	Clamdigger	—	—	—	1972	The station closed when the Clamdigger was discontinued on January 28, 1972.
Guthrie	Guthrie, Oklahoma	Lone Star	1973	—	—	1979	The station was closed after the discontinuance of the Lone Star in October 1979. The station opened for one weekend from September 29 – October 2, 2005, as an extension of the Heartland Flyer for the Guthrie Music Festival.
Hamilton	Hamilton, Ontario	Maple Leaf	—	—	—	1992	The station closed on May 25, 1992, and replaced by Aldershot. Connections were available to VIA Rail.
Hamilton	Hamilton, Ohio	Cardinal	1980	—	—	2005	Flag stop. Amtrak ceased service to Hamilton due to low ridership and poor station conditions.
Hancock	Hancock, West Virginia	Blue Ridge (1973–1981) Shenandoah (1976–1978)	1973	—	—	1981	The station closed with the discontinued Shenandoah on September 30, 1981.
Henderson	Henderson, North Carolina	Silver Star	1978	—	—	1986	The station closed due to the abandonment of a line between Petersburg, Virginia and Raleigh, North Carolina.
Hinkle–Hermiston (HIK)	Hermiston, Oregon	Pioneer	1977	—	—	1997	The station closed with the discontinued Pioneer on May 11, 1997.
Hobart (HOB)	Hobart, Indiana	Calumet	—	—	—	1991	The station closed with the discontinued Calumet on May 3, 1991.
Hood River (HOO)	Hood River, Oregon	Pioneer	1977	—	—	1997	The station closed with the discontinued Pioneer on May 11, 1997.
Hyannis (HYA)	Hyannis, Massachusetts	Cape Codder	1986	—	—	1996	The station closed with the discontinued Cape Codder after the 1996 season due to low ridership. The station is currently served by the Cape Cod Central Railroad and the seasonal CapeFlyer service.
Indiana Harbor (IDH)	Indiana Harbor, Indiana	Calumet	—	—	—	1991	The station closed with the discontinued Calumet on May 3, 1991.
Indio	Indio, California	Sunset Limited Texas Eagle	—	—	—	1998	The station closed in October 1998 due to low ridership.
Ingersoll (ING)	Ingersoll, Ontario	International	1982	—	—	1990	The station closed with the rerouting of the International in January 1990. Connections were available to VIA Rail.
Jamestown	Jamestown, North Dakota	North Coast Hiawatha	—	—	—	1979	The station closed when the North Coast Hiawatha was discontinued on September 29, 1979.
Janesville (JVI)	Janesville, Wisconsin	Lake Country Limited	2000	—	—	2001	The station closed with the discontinuance of the Lake Country Limited on September 22, 2001.
Jeffersonville (JFV)	Jeffersonville, Indiana	Kentucky Cardinal	2001	—	—	2003	The station closed with the discontinued Kentucky Cardinal on July 4, 2003.
Keyser	Keyser, West Virginia	Shenandoah	1976	—	—	1981	The station closed with the discontinued Shenandoah on September 30, 1981.
Kitchener (KOT)	Kitchener, Ontario	International	1982	—	—	2004	The station closed with the discontinuance of the International on April 23, 2004. Connections were available to GO Transit and VIA Rail.
La Grande (LAE)	La Grande, Oregon	Pioneer	1977	—	—	1997	The station closed with the discontinued Pioneer on May 11, 1997.
Laguna Niguel/Mission Viejo (LNL)	Laguna Niguel, California	Pacific Surfliner	2007	—	—	2012	The stations closed in late 2012. Connections were available to Metrolink's Inland Empire–Orange County Line and Orange County Line, who continues to service the station.
Lake Geneva (LKG)	Zenda, Wisconsin	Lake Country Limited	2000	—	—	2001	The station closed with the discontinuance of the Lake Country Limited on September 22, 2001.
Laramie (LAR)	Laramie, Wyoming	City of San Francisco (1971–1972) Pioneer (1991–1997) San Francisco Zephyr (1972–1983)	—	1991	—	1997	The station closed with the discontinued Pioneer on May 11, 1997.
Laredo	Laredo, Texas	Inter-American	—	—	—	1981	The station closed with the discontinued Inter-American on September 30, 1981.
Las Vegas (LVS)	Las Vegas, Nevada	Desert Wind	—	—	—	1997	The station closed with the discontinued Desert Wind on May 12, 1997.
Lee Hall (LHV)	Lee Hall, Virginia	Colonial	1977	—	—	1992	Flag stop. The station closed in April 1992.
Leetes Island	Guilford, Connecticut	Clamdigger	—	—	—	1972	Flag stop. The station closed when the Clamdigger was discontinued on January 28, 1972.
Lima (LIA)	Lima, Ohio	Broadway Limited (1971–1990) Capitol Limited (1971–1990)	—	—	—	1990	The station closed with the rerouted Broadway Limited and Capitol Limited on November 11, 1990.
Levittown–Tullytown	Tullytown, Pennsylvania	Northeast Services	1971	—	—	—	The station is currently served by the SEPTA Trenton Line.
Lindenwold (LWD)	Lindenwold, New Jersey	Atlantic City Express	1989	—	—	1994	Amtrak discontinued service to Lindenwold in July 1994 and replaced it with the new Cherry Hill station. Connections were available to New Jersey Transit's Atlantic City Line and PATCO Speedline.
Livingston	Livingston, Alabama	Crescent	—	—	—	1980	Livingston station closed on October 26, 1980, due to low ridership.
Livingston	Livingston, Montana	North Coast Hiawatha	—	—	—	1979	The station closed when the North Coast Hiawatha was discontinued on September 29, 1979.
Logansport	Logansport, Indiana	Floridian (1972–1975)	1972	—	—	1975	The station closed with the rerouted Floridian on February 17, 1975.
London (LOT)	London, Ontario	International	1982	—	—	2004	The station closed with the discontinuance of the International on April 23, 2004. Connections were available to VIA Rail.
Louisville Auto-Train	Louisville, Kentucky	Auto Train	1976	—	—	1977	Amtrak and Auto Train discontinued the Louisville service on October 31, 1977 due to insufficient ticket sales.
Louisville Union	Louisville, Kentucky	Floridian (1971–1979) Kentucky Cardinal (2001–2003) South Wind (1971)	—	2001	—	2003	The station closed with the discontinued Floridian on October 6, 1979, and closed again on July 4, 2003, with the end of the Kentucky Cardinal.
Lovelock (LOL)	Lovelock, Nevada	California Zephyr (1983–1997) Denver Zephyr (1971–1973) San Francisco Zephyr (1972–1983)	—	—	—	1997	The station closed on May 11, 1997.
Lynchburg–Woodall Road	Lynchburg, Virginia	Hilltopper (1977–1979) Mountaineer (1977–1979)	1975	—	—	1979	The station closed with the discontinued Hilltopper on September 30, 1979.
Madison	Madison, Connecticut	Beacon Hill	—	—	—	1981	The station closed when the Beacon Hill was discontinued on September 30, 1981. Service at Madison is currently serviced by ConnDOT's Shore Line East.
Malton (MON)	Malton, Ontario	International	1990	—	—	2004	The station closed with the discontinuance of the International on April 23, 2004. Connections were available to GO Transit and VIA Rail.
Malvern (MVN)	Malvern, Pennsylvania	Keystone Service	—	—	—	1998	Amtrak closed the station in April 1998. The station is currently served by SEPTA's Paoli/Thorndale Line.
Mandan	Mandan, North Dakota	North Coast Hiawatha	—	—	—	1979	The station closed when the North Coast Hiawatha was discontinued on September 29, 1979.
Mansfield	Mansfield, Massachusetts	Northeast Services	—	—	—	—	The station is currently served by the MBTA Providence Line.
Marceline (MAR)	Marceline, Missouri	Southwest Chief	—	—	—	1997	The station closed on May 11, 1997.
Marion	Marion, Indiana	Cardinal	1975	—	—	1986	The station closed with the rerouted Cardinal on April 27, 1986.
Marysville	Marysville, California	Coast Starlight	1982	—	—	1999	
McKeesport	McKeesport, Pennsylvania	Capitol Limited	—	—	—	1990	Amtrak closed the station on November 11, 1990, due to low ridership.
Mechanicville	Mechanicville, New York	Adirondack	—	—	—	1978	Flag stop. The station was closed as part of a realigned Adirondack via Schenectady.
Merion	Lower Merion Township, Pennsylvania	Silverliner Service	—	—	—	1980	Amtrak closed the station in October 1982. The station is currently served by SEPTA's Paoli/Thorndale Line.
Metuchen	Metuchen, New Jersey	Northeast Services	—	—	—	1975	The station closed on October 26, 1975. Metuchen station is currently served by New Jersey Transit's Northeast Corridor Line and North Jersey Coast Line.
Miami	Miami, Florida	Floridian Silver Meteor Silver Star	1927	1930	—	1978	Closed on June 19, 1978, when operations were moved to the purpose built Amtrak station
Michigan City (MCI)	Michigan City, Indiana	Wolverine	1981	—	—	2022	Closed on April 4, 2022
Miles City	Miles City, Montana	North Coast Hiawatha	—	—	—	1979	The station closed when the North Coast Hiawatha was discontinued on September 29, 1979.
Milford (MFD)	Milford, Utah	Desert Wind	—	—	—	1997	The station closed with the discontinued Desert Wind on May 12, 1997.
Minneapolis	St. Paul, Minnesota	Empire Builder (1971–2014) North Coast Hiawatha (1971–1978)	—	—	—	1978	The station closed on when Amtrak moved service to St. Paul Midway station on April 1, 1978.
Missoula	Missoula, Montana	North Coast Hiawatha	—	—	—	1979	The station closed when the North Coast Hiawatha was discontinued on September 29, 1979.
Monmouth	Monmouth, Illinois	California Zephyr (1983) Denver Zephyr (1971–1973) Desert Wind (1979–1983) Pioneer (1977–1983) San Francisco Zephyr (1972–1983)	—	—	—	1983	The station at Monmouth was discontinued on October 30, 1983.
Monroe	Monroe, Virginia	Crescent	—	—	—	1990	The station closed in April 1990.
Montgomery (MGM)	Montgomery, Alabama	Floridian (1971–1979) Gulf Breeze (1989–1995) South Wind (1971)	1989	—	—	1995	The station closed when the Gulf Breeze was discontinued on April 1, 1995.
Montreal–West	Montreal, Quebec	Adirondack	—	—	—	1983	Amtrak discontinued the station in October 1983 to speed up Adirondack times.
Montreal–Windsor	Montreal, Quebec	Adirondack	—	—	—	1985	Amtrak departed Windsor Station in favor of Central Station in 1985.
Morris	Morris, Minnesota	Empire Builder	—	—	—	1979	The station closed with the rerouted Empire Builder via St. Cloud in October 1979.
Mountain Home	Mountain Home, Idaho	Pioneer	1977	—	—	1981	The station closed on April 26, 1981.
Muncie	Muncie, Indiana	Cardinal	1974	—	—	1986	The station closed with the rerouted Cardinal on April 27, 1986.
Nampa (NAM)	Nampa, Idaho	Pioneer	1977	—	—	1997	The station closed with the discontinued Pioneer on May 11, 1997.
Nappanee (NPI)	Nappanee, Indiana	Broadway Limited (1990–1995) Three Rivers (1996–2005)	1990	1996	—	2005	The station was closed after the discontinuance of the Broadway Limited on September 10, 1995. Service on the Three Rivers did not start until the extension of the train to Chicago Union Station. The Three Rivers was discontinued on March 7, 2005.
Narberth	Narberth, Pennsylvania	Keystone Service	—	—	—	1980	Amtrak closed the station in October 1982. The station is currently served by SEPTA's Paoli/Thorndale Line.
Narrows	Narrows, Virginia	Hilltopper (1977–1979) Mountaineer (1977–1979)	1975	—	—	1979	The station closed with the discontinued Hilltopper on September 30, 1979.
Nashville	Nashville, Tennessee	Floridian (1971–1979) South Wind (1971)	—	—	—	1979	The station closed with the discontinued Floridian on October 6, 1979.
Newport (NPT)	Newport, Arkansas	Inter-American Texas Eagle	1974	—	—	1996	The station closed on April 14, 1996, when Mineola station in Texas opened.
Newport News (NPN)	Newport News, Virginia	Northeast Regional	1981	—	—	2024	The station closed on August 22, 2024, when the Newport News Transportation Center opened.
Newtonville	Newtonville, Massachusetts	Bay State	1971	—	—	1972	The station closed on October 26, 1972. The station is currently served by the MBTA Worcester Line.
New Westminster	New Westminster, British Columbia	Pacific International	—	—	—	1981	The station closed with the discontinued Pacific International on September 30, 1981.
New York–Grand Central (NYG)	New York, New York	Hudson Highlander Hudson River Express Lake Shore Limited Mohawk Rip Van Winkle Sleepy Hollow	—	—	—	1991	Amtrak ceased using Grand Central on April 6, 1991. During construction work at Penn Station, services north out of Penn Station were moved to Grand Central.
Niagara Falls (NFL)	Niagara Falls, New York	Empire Service (1978–2016) Maple Leaf (1981–2016) Niagara Rainbow (1978–1979)	1978	—	—	2016	The station closed when the new station in Niagara Falls opened on December 6, 2016.
Norfolk (Lambert's Point)	Norfolk, Virginia	Mountaineer	1975	—	—	1977	Closed when the Mountaineer was discontinued. A new Norfolk station opened in 2012.
North Haven	North Haven, Connecticut	Fast Mail Merchants Limited Shoreliner Service Yankee Clipper	—	—	—	1986	The station closed on October 26, 1986, due to low ridership.
Nottoway County	Crewe, Virginia	Hilltopper (1977–1979) Mountaineer (1977–1979)	1975	—	—	1979	The station closed with the discontinued Hilltopper on September 30, 1979.
Oakland–16th Street (OAK)	Oakland, California	California Zephyr Coast Starlight	1912	1989	—	1994	The station was damaged in the 1989 Loma Prieta earthquake, forcing them to move to a temporary station nearby. This station closed in 1994 when services moved to Emeryville permanently on August 21.
Oakland	Oakland, Maryland	Shenandoah	1976	—	—	1981	The station closed with the discontinued Shenandoah on September 30, 1981.
Ocala Union Station (OCA)	Ocala, Florida	Floridian (1971–1979) South Wind (1971) Palmetto (2002–2004) Silver Palm (1996–2002)	—	1996	—	2004	The station closed with the truncation of the Palmetto back to Savannah, Georgia.
Odenton	Odenton, Maryland	Chesapeake	1978	—	—	1983	The station was discontinued with the end of the Chespeake in October 1983. Odenton station is currently served by MARC Train's Penn Line.
Ogden (OGD)	Ogden, Utah	Pioneer (1991–1997) San Francisco Zephyr (1972–1983)	—	—	—	1997	The station closed with the discontinued Pioneer on May 11, 1997.
Ontario (ONT)	Ontario, Oregon	Pioneer	1977	—	—	1997	The station closed with the discontinued Pioneer on May 11, 1997.
Orange (OGE)	Orange, California	Pacific Surfliner	2007	—	—	2012	The stations closed in late 2012. Connections were available to Metrolink's Inland Empire–Orange County Line and Orange County Line, who continues to service the station.
Orland	Orland, California	Coast Starlight	1974	—	—	1982	Orland station closed on April 25, 1982, when the Coast Starlight was rerouted via Sacramento.
Overbrook	Philadelphia, Pennsylvania	Keystone Service	—	—	—	1987	Amtrak closed the station in October 1987. The station is currently served by SEPTA's Paoli/Thorndale Line.
Paradise	Paradise, Montana	North Coast Hiawatha	—	—	—	1979	The station closed when the North Coast Hiawatha was discontinued on September 29, 1979.
Parkersburg	Parkersburg, West Virginia	Shenandoah	1976	—	—	1981	The station closed with the discontinued Shenandoah on September 30, 1981.
Pasadena (PAS)	Pasadena, California	Southwest Chief	—	—	—	1994	The station was discontinued on January 20, 1994, when the Southwest Chief was rerouted.
Pendleton (PEN)	Pendleton, Oregon	Pioneer	1977	—	—	1997	The station closed with the discontinued Pioneer on May 11, 1997.
Peoria	East Peoria, Illinois	Prairie Marksman	1980	—	—	1981	The station closed with the discontinued Prairie Marksman on October 5, 1981.
Perry	Perry, Oklahoma	Lone Star	—	—	—	1979	The station was closed after the discontinuance of the Lone Star in October 1979.
Perryville	Perryville, Maryland	Chesapeake	1978	—	—	1983	The station was discontinued with the end of the Chespeake in October 1983. Perryville station is currently served by MARC Train's Penn Line.
Peru	Peru, Indiana	Cardinal	1974	—	—	1986	The station closed with the rerouted Cardinal on April 27, 1986.
Petersburg–Fleet Street	Petersburg, Virginia	Hilltopper (1977–1979)	1977	—	—	1979	The station closed with the discontinued Hilltopper on September 30, 1979.
Petersburg–River Street	Petersburg, Virginia	Mountaineer (1975–1977)	1975	—	—	1977	The station closed with the discontinued Mountaineer on May 30, 1977, when it was replaced by the Hilltopper.
Suburban Station/Penn Center	Philadelphia, Pennsylvania	Chesapeake (1980–1981) Keystone Service (1981–1988)	1980	—	—	1988	The station was discontinued with the truncation of the Keystone Service in 1988. Suburban Station currently serves all SEPTA Regional Rail services.
Pine Orchard	Branford, Connecticut	Clamdigger	—	—	—	1972	Flag stop. The station closed when the Clamdigger was discontinued on January 28, 1972.
Pitcairn	Pitcairn, Pennsylvania	Fort Pitt	—	—	—	1983	Amtrak closed the station on January 30, 1983, after the end of the Fort Pitt.
Phoenix (PHX)	Phoenix, Arizona	Sunset Limited Texas Eagle	—	—	—	1996	The station closed after the Sunset Limited and Texas Eagle were rerouted via Maricopa on June 3, 1996.
Pocatello (POC)	Pocatello, Idaho	Pioneer	1977	—	1993	1997	The station closed with the discontinued Pioneer on May 11, 1997.
Pomona–Garey Avenue (POA)	Pomona, California	Southwest Chief	—	—	—	1994	The station was discontinued on January 20, 1994, when the Southwest Chief was rerouted. Amtrak still services the nearby Pomona-Downtown station.
Ponca	Ponca City, Oklahoma	Lone Star	—	—	—	1979	The station was closed after the discontinuance of the Lone Star in October 1979.
Poinciana	Poinciana, Florida	Champion Floridian	1974	—	—	1975	Amtrak replaced Poinciana with Kissimmee on December 12, 1975, just over a year after opening Ponciana station.
Poplarville	Poplarville, Mississippi	Crescent	—	—	—	1982	Poplarville station closed in November 1982 and was replaced by the station in Picayune.
Purvis	Purvis, Mississippi	Crescent	—	—	—	1980	Purvis station closed on October 26, 1980, due to low ridership.
Radnor	Radnor, Pennsylvania	Keystone Service	—	—	—	1980	Amtrak closed the station in October 1982. The station is currently served by SEPTA's Paoli/Thorndale Line.
Rahway	Rahway, New Jersey	Northeast Services	—	—	—	1975	The station closed on October 26, 1975. Rahway station is currently served by New Jersey Transit's Northeast Corridor Line and North Jersey Coast Line.
Rawlins (RWL)	Rawlins, Wyoming	City of San Francisco (1971–1972) Pioneer (1991–1997) San Francisco Zephyr (1972–1983)	—	1991	—	1997	The station closed with the discontinued Pioneer on May 11, 1997.
Richmond–3rd & C Streets	Richmond, Indiana	Cardinal	1974	—	—	1986	The station closed with the rerouted Cardinal on April 27, 1986.
Richmond–10th & E Streets	Richmond, Indiana	National Limited	—	—	—	1979	The station closed with the discontinued National Limited on October 1, 1979.
Richmond–Broad Street	Richmond, Virginia	Silver Meteor (1971–1975) Silver Star (1971–1975) Champion (1971–1975) Carolina Special	—	—	—	1975	
Richmond–Ellerson Street	Richmond, Virginia	James Whitcomb Riley	1975	—	—	1976	
Rifle	Rifle, Colorado	California Zephyr (1983–1987) Denver Zephyr (1971–1973) San Francisco Zephyr (1972–1983)	—	—	—	1983	The station at Rifle was discontinued on October 30, 1983.
Riverbank (RVB)	Riverbank, California	San Joaquin	—	—	—	1999	Riverbank station closed on October 30, 1999, and replaced by the station in Modesto.
Rockford	Rockford, Illinois	Black Hawk	—	—	—	1981	The station closed when the Black Hawk was discontinued on September 30, 1981.
Rock Springs (RSG)	Rock Springs, Wyoming	City of San Francisco (1971–1972) Pioneer (1991–1997) San Francisco Zephyr (1972–1983)	—	1991	—	1997	The station closed with the discontinued Pioneer on May 11, 1997.
Rosenberg	Rosenberg, Texas	Inter-American Sunset Limited	—	—	—	1981	The station closed on October 24, 1981.
Rowlesburg	Rowlesburg, West Virginia	Shenandoah	1976	—	—	1981	The station closed with the discontinued Shenandoah on September 30, 1981.
Rye	Rye, New York	Bay State Benjamin Franklin Connecticut Yankee Fast Mail Mail Express Merchants Limited Metroliner Potomac Yankee Clipper	—	—	—	1987	Service was available to Metro-North Railroad's New Haven Line. Amtrak traded service at Rye station on October 25, 1987, in favor of New Rochelle station.
Sandstone	Sandstone, Minnesota	North Star	1975	—	—	1985	The station closed when Amtrak discontinued the North Star on April 7, 1985.
Sandwich (SDW)	Sandwich, Massachusetts	Cape Codder	1986	—	—	1996	The station closed with the discontinued Cape Codder after the 1996 season due to low ridership. The station is currently served by the Cape Cod Central Railroad.
Sanford (SFD)	Sanford, Florida	Silver Meteor Silver Star Sunset Limited	—	—	1995	2005	The station closed due to the rundown condition of the depot.
Sarnia (SIA)	Sarnia, Ontario	International	1982	—	—	2004	The station closed with the discontinuance of the International on April 23, 2004. Connections were available to VIA Rail.
Seligman	Seligman, Arizona	Southwest Chief	—	—	—	1985	The station closed between October 1984 and April 1985.
Shannock	Shannock, Rhode Island	Beacon Hill	—	—	—	1981	Flag stop. The station closed when the Beacon Hill was discontinued on September 30, 1981.
Shoshone (SHO)	Shoshone, Idaho	Pioneer	1977	—	—	1997	The station closed with the discontinued Pioneer on May 11, 1997.
Silver Spring	Silver Spring, Maryland	Blue Ridge (1973–1986) Shenandoah (1976–1978)	1973	—	—	1986	The station was discontinued with the end of the Blue Ridge in October 1986.
Sorrento Valley (SRB)	San Diego, California	Pacific Surfliner (2013–2018) San Diegan (1995–2000)	1995	—	—	2018	Connections were available to COASTER, who continues to service the station.
Sparks (SPR)	Sparks, Nevada	California Zephyr (1983–2009) Denver Zephyr (1971–1973) San Francisco Zephyr (1972–1983)	—	—	—	2009	Amtrak closed Sparks station in 2009 due to navigation issues with the Union Pacific Railroad yard.
St. Louis Union	St. Louis, Missouri	Inter-American	1894	—	—	1978	Amtrak moved out of St. Louis Union Station on October 31, 1978, for a smaller station.
St. Marys (SMA)	St. Marys, Ontario	International	1982	—	—	2004	The station closed with the discontinuance of the International on April 23, 2004. Connections were available to VIA Rail.
St. Thomas	St. Thomas, Ontario	Niagara Rainbow	—	—	—	1979	The station closed with the discontinuance of the Niagara Rainbow on January 31, 1979, due to lack of an operating subsidy.
Stoney Creek	Branford, Connecticut	Clamdigger	—	—	—	1978	Flag stop. The station closed when the Clamdigger was discontinued on April 28, 1978.
St. Paul–Midway (MSP)	St. Paul, Minnesota	Empire Builder (1971–2014) North Coast Hiawatha (1978–1979) North Star (1978–1985)	1978	—	—	2014	The station closed when Amtrak moved service in St. Paul to Saint Paul Union Station.
St. Petersburg	St. Petersburg, Florida	Champion (1971–1979) Floridian (1971–1979) South Wind (1971) Silver Meteor (1971–1984)	—	—	—	1984	The station closed with the truncation of the Silver Services on February 1, 1984.
Strathroy (SRY)	Strathroy, Ontario	International	1982	—	—	2004	The station closed with the discontinuance of the International on April 23, 2004. Connections were available to VIA Rail.
Stratford (STF)	Stratford, Ontario	International	1982	—	—	2004	The station closed with the discontinuance of the International on April 23, 2004. Connections were available to VIA Rail.
Streator (STR)	Streator, Illinois	Southwest Chief (1984–1996)	—	—	—	1996	The station closed when the Southwest Chief was rerouted via the Burlington Northern Santa Fe Railway tracks.
Suffolk	Suffolk, Virginia	Mountaineer (1975–1977)	1975	—	—	1977	The station closed with the discontinued Mountaineer on May 30, 1977, when it was replaced by the Hilltopper.
Superior	Superior, Wisconsin	North Star	1975	—	—	1984	The station closed in October 1984.
Syracuse (East Syracuse)	East Syracuse, New York	Empire State Express Niagara Rainbow Salt City Express	1962	—	—	1999	
Tacoma Union	Tacoma, Washington	Coast Starlight International Limited	—	—	—	1984	The station closed when they moved Amtrak service to a smaller station in the city.
Tacoma	Tacoma, Washington	Coast Starlight Cascades	1984	—	—	2021	The station closed when Amtrak services were rerouted over the Point Defiance Bypass on November 18, 2021.
Taunton (TAU)	Taunton, Massachusetts	Cape Codder	1986	—	—	1996	The station closed with the discontinued Cape Codder after the 1996 season due to low ridership.
Tempe (TMP)	Tempe, Arizona	Sunset Limited Texas Eagle	—	—	—	1996	The station closed after the Sunset Limited and Texas Eagle were rerouted via Maricopa on June 3, 1996.
Terre Haute	Terre Haute, Indiana	National Limited	—	—	—	1979	The station closed with the discontinued National Limited on October 1, 1979.
Thalmann	Thalmann, Georgia	Silver Meteor	—	—	—	1979	The station closed when the Silver Meteor was rerouted via Jesup.
The Dalles (THD)	The Dalles, Oregon	Pioneer	1977	—	—	1997	The station closed with the discontinued Pioneer on May 11, 1997.
Thomasville	Thomasville, Georgia	Floridian (1971–1979) South Wind (1971)	—	—	—	1979	The station closed with the discontinued Floridian on October 6, 1979.
Thompson (TOS)	Thompson, Utah	California Zephyr	—	—	1985	1997	The station at Thompson closed on May 11, 1997, when Green River reopened.
Troy	Troy, Montana	Empire Builder	—	—	—	1973	The station closed on February 15, 1973, the same day service began at Browning.
Valdosta	Valdosta, Georgia	Floridian (1971–1979) South Wind (1971)	—	—	—	1979	The station closed with the discontinued Floridian on October 6, 1979.
Valley City	Valley City, North Dakota	North Coast Hiawatha	—	—	—	1979	The station closed when the North Coast Hiawatha was discontinued on September 29, 1979.
Valparaiso	Valparaiso, Indiana	Broadway Limited (1976–1990) Calumet (1979–1991) Capitol Limited (1976–1990)	1976	—	—	1991	Service to Valparaiso began on an experimental basis on April 25, 1976. The station closed with the discontinued Calumet on May 3, 1991.
Waldo (WDO)	Waldo, Florida	Floridian (1971–1979) South Wind (1971) Palmetto (2002–2004) Silver Palm (1996–2002)	—	1996	—	2004	The station closed with the truncation of the Palmetto back to Savannah, Georgia.
Wareham (WRE)	Wareham, Massachusetts	Cape Codder	1986	—	—	1996	The station closed with the discontinued Cape Codder after the 1996 season due to low ridership.
Warren	Warren, Illinois	Black Hawk	—	—	—	1981	The station closed when the Black Hawk was discontinued on September 30, 1981.
Warsaw (WSW)	Warsaw, Indiana	Broadway Limited (1985–1990) Capitol Limited (1985–1990)	—	—	—	1990	The station closed with the rerouted Broadway Limited and Capitol Limited on November 11, 1990.
Waycross	Waycross, Georgia	Floridian (1971–1979) South Wind (1971)	—	—	—	1979	The station closed with the discontinued Floridian on October 6, 1979.
Watervliet	Watervliet, New York	Adirondack	—	—	—	1978	Flag stop. The station was closed as part of a realigned Adirondack via Schenectady.
Wayne	Wayne, Pennsylvania	Keystone Service	—	—	—	1987	Amtrak closed the station in October 1987. The station is currently served by SEPTA's Paoli/Thorndale Line.
Welch	Welch, West Virginia	Hilltopper (1977–1979) Mountaineer (1977–1979)	1975	—	—	1979	The station closed with the discontinued Hilltopper on September 30, 1979.
Wellesley	Wellesley, Massachusetts	Bay State	1971	1984	—	1986	The station closed on October 26, 1986, due to low ridership.
West Barnstable (WBR)	West Barnstable, Massachusetts	Cape Codder	1986	—	—	1996	The station closed with the discontinued Cape Codder after the 1996 season due to low ridership. The station is currently served by the Cape Cod Central Railroad.
Westmount	Westmount, Quebec	Adirondack	—	—	—	1983	Amtrak discontinued the station in October 1983 to speed up Adirondack times.
West Quincy (WQC)	West Quincy, Missouri	Illinois Zephyr	—	—	—	1994	The station was discontinued on May 1, 1994, when service was truncated to Quincy.
Wheeler (WEE)	Wheeler, Indiana	Calumet	—	—	—	1991	The station closed with the discontinued Calumet on May 3, 1991.
Whitford (WHI)	Whitford, Pennsylvania	Keystone Service	—	—	—	1998	Amtrak closed the station in April 1998. The station is currently served by SEPTA's Paoli/Thorndale Line.
Whiting (WII)	Whiting, Indiana	Calumet	—	—	—	1991	The station closed with the discontinued Calumet on May 3, 1991.
Wichita	Wichita, Kansas	Lone Star	—	—	—	1979	The station was closed after the discontinuance of the Lone Star in October 1979.
Wickford Junction	North Kingstown, Rhode Island	Beacon Hill	—	—	—	1981	Flag stop. The station closed when the Beacon Hill was discontinued on September 30, 1981.
Wildwood (WWD)	Wildwood, Florida	Floridian (1971–1979) South Wind (1971) Palmetto (2002–2004) Silver Palm (1996–2002)	—	1996	—	2004	The station closed with the truncation of the Palmetto back to Savannah, Georgia.
Williams Junction (WMJ)	Williams, Arizona	Southwest Chief	—	—	—	2018	The station closed after the Grand Canyon Railway decided to discontinue shuttle bus service from Williams Junction.
Wilkinsburg	Wilkinsburg, Pennsylvania	National Limited	—	—	—	1975	Flag stop. Amtrak closed the station on September 14, 1975, due to low patronage.
Williamsburg–Pottery Factory (WBP)	Williamsburg, Virginia	NortheastDirect Tidewater	1993	—	—	1996	Flag stop. The station closed in April 1996.
Williamson	Williamson, West Virginia	Hilltopper (1977–1979) Mountaineer (1977–1979)	1975	—	—	1979	The station closed with the discontinued Hilltopper on September 30, 1979.
Willimantic (WIM)	Willimantic, Connecticut	Montrealer	1991	—	—	1994	The station closed when Amtrak rerouted the Vermonter in December 1994.
Willsboro (WLS)	Willsboro, New York	Adirondack	—	—	—	1987	Seasonal-only stop. The station was closed after the 1987 season, but never reopened in 1988.
Willmar	Willmar, Minnesota	Empire Builder	—	—	—	1979	The station closed with the rerouted Empire Builder via St. Cloud in October 1979.
Windsor	Windsor, Ontario	Niagara Rainbow	—	—	—	1979	The station closed with the discontinuance of the Niagara Rainbow on January 31, 1979, due to lack of an operating subsidy.
Winona (WNA)	Winona, Mississippi	City of New Orleans (1981–1995) Panama Limited (1971–1981) River Cities (1984–1993)	—	—	—	1995	The station closed when the City of New Orleans was rerouted via Yazoo City and Greenwood in 1995.
Woodburn	Woodburn, Oregon	Mount Rainier Willamette Valley	1980	—	—	1982	The station closed with the discontinued Willamette Valley on January 1, 1982.
Woodstock (WSK)	Woodstock, Ontario	International	1982	—	—	1990	The station closed with the rerouting of the International in January 1990. Connections were available to VIA Rail.
Yakima	Yakima, Washington	Empire Builder	—	—	—	1981	The station closed with the rerouted Empire Builder on October 25, 1981.
Youngstown (YTO)	Youngstown, Ohio	Broadway Limited (1971–1995) Three Rivers (1998–2005)	—	1997	1993	2005	The station was closed after the discontinuance of the Broadway Limited on September 10, 1995. Service on the Three Rivers did not start until May 16, 1997. The Three Rivers was discontinued on March 7, 2005.
Ypsilanti	Ypsilanti, Michigan	Michigan Executive Twilight Limited Wolverine	—	—	—	1985	The station closed in April 1985.

== Proposed / cancelled stations ==
Station	Location	Service	Notes
Arlington	Arlington, Texas	Inter-American & Lone Star	A stop was planned to be added here between 1975 and 1977. During that time it was listed on the timetable for the Lone Star and the Inter-American with a note reading that a service date would be announced later, but it never opened.
Dennsion	Dennison, Ohio	National Limited	A stop was planned to be added here in 1979, it was even listed on the July 1979, timetables with a marker denoting that its opening date would soon be announced, but it never opened and the National Limited was discontinued in October of that year because of low ridership.
Dunkirk	Dunkirk, New York	Lake Shore Limited	This stop was shown on the timetables, with an opening date to be announced, between April 14, 1996 and October 26, 1997. The station was never added and mention was removed from the timetables.
Lyons	Lyons, New York	Empire Service	A station was proposed at Lyons to bridge between Rochester and Syracuse as early as 1990. Despite an agreement with CSX for a station location in 2001, a station was never built.
Miami	Miami, Florida	Silver Meteor & Silver Star	This station was constructed with the intention of serving as a sort of Union Station for Tri-Rail, Metrorail, and the MIA Mover and Amtrak. Signs were erected denoting where Amtrak trains would stop, however, after some disagreements, Amtrak never moved in, leaving the station solely serving the other aforementioned services.
Minidoka	Minidoka, Idaho	Pioneer	Demand for a stop on Amtrak's new Idaho service requested a stop in Minidoka for residents of nearby Burley and Rupert, Idaho began in 1974. Amtrak, after much consideration, declined to add a flag stop at Minidoka in 1977.
Welland	Welland, Ontario	Empire State Express	During 1975, the Empire State Express was planned to stop at Welland with the station name appearing on timetables with an opening date to be announced. However, the station never opened.

== See also ==
- List of busiest Amtrak stations
- List of Amtrak stations in California
- List of IATA-indexed train stations
- List of major cities in U.S. lacking Amtrak service
- List of Greyhound Bus stations

== Bibliography ==
- Orzoco, Michael Anthony (2012). Images of America: Alhambra. Mount Pleasant, South Carolina: Arcadia Publishing. ISBN 9780738576077.
- Sanders, Craig (2006). Amtrak in the Heartland. Bloomington, Indiana: Indiana University Press. ISBN 9780253027931.
