= Fast Mail =

Many railroads ran trains named Fast Mail, including:

- Fast Mail (Amtrak train) – Amtrak
- Fast Mail (C&NW train) – Chicago & North Western
- Fast Mail (CB&Q train) - Chicago, Burlington and Quincy Railroad
- Fast Mail (Great Northern train) – Great Northern Railway (U.S.)
- Fast Mail (MC train) - Michigan Central Railroad
- Fast Mail (Milwaukee Road train) – Chicago, Milwaukee, St. Paul and Pacific Railroad
- Fast Mail (NYC train) – New York Central Railroad
- Fast Mail (Southern Railway train) - Southern Railway (U.S.) had a Fast Mail train more famously known as "Old 97" which was in the Wreck of the Old 97 in 1903.

== See also ==
- The Fast Mail, a 1922 American silent film
