= Amtrak Standard Stations Program =

Train station design effort by Amtrak

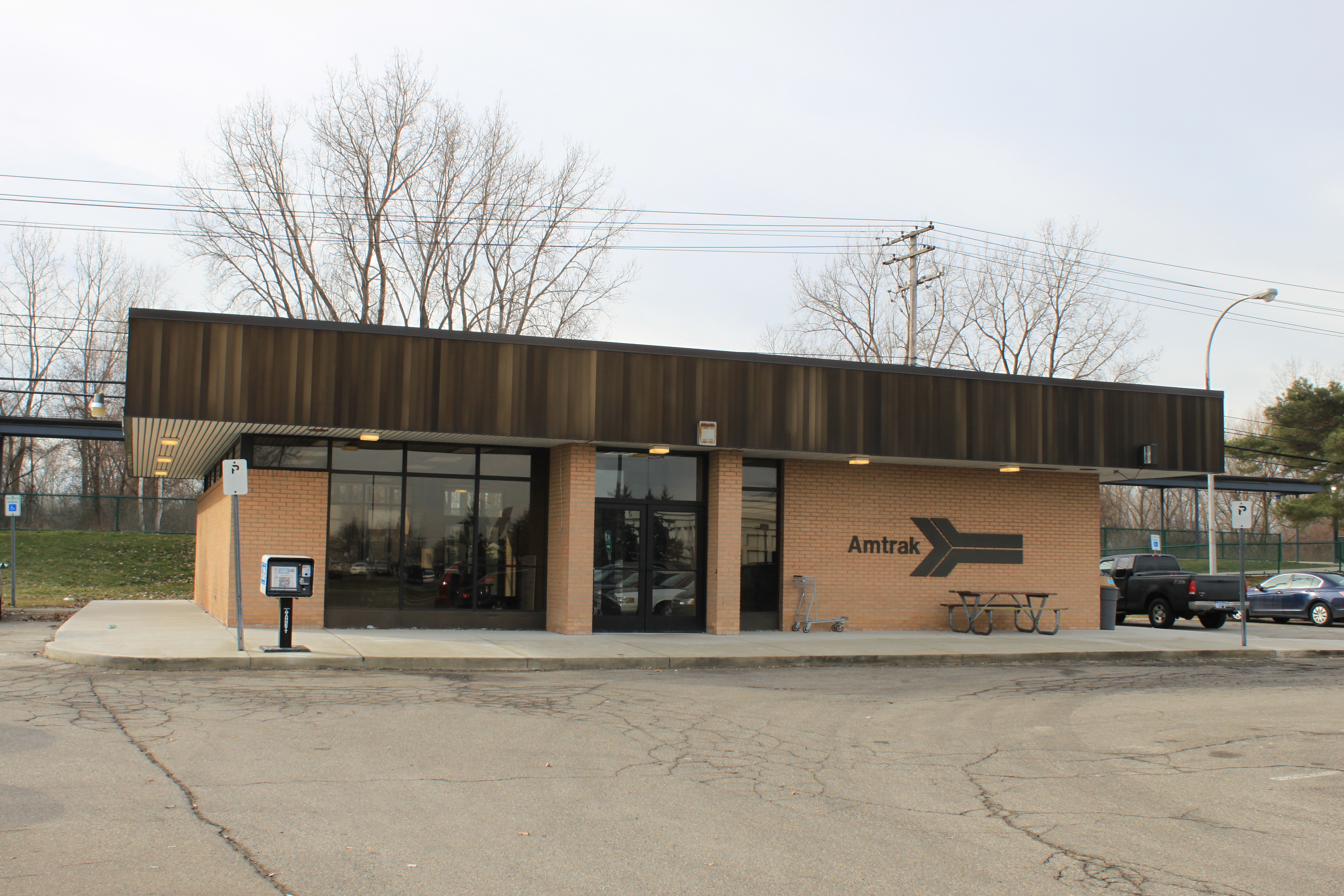

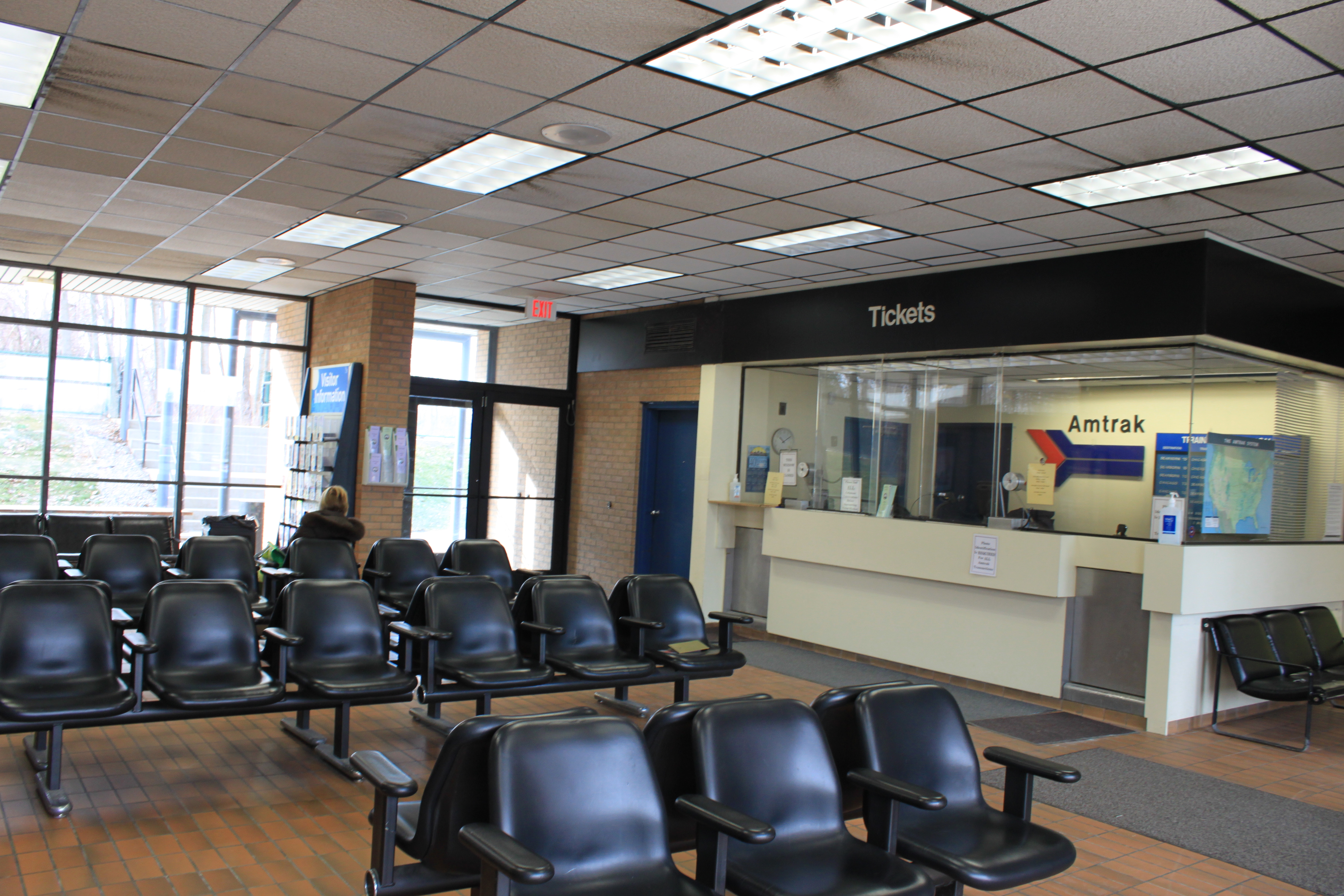
Interior and exterior of former Dearborn station building, constructed in 1978 and closed in 2014

The Amtrak Standard Stations Program was an effort by Amtrak to create a standardized station design. The railroad launched the effort in 1978 to reduce costs, speed construction, and improve its corporate image.

== Background ==
When Amtrak was founded in 1971, it had no facilities beyond the station buildings and depots inherited from its constituent railroads. Many were in disrepair. Elsewhere, route realignments, ownership conflicts, or a lack of existing facilities required the construction of new station houses. Additionally, existing grand terminals in many large cities were larger than Amtrak needed and were expensive to retain. These reasons and others prompted the effort to provide those locations with more modern and appropriately sized facilities.

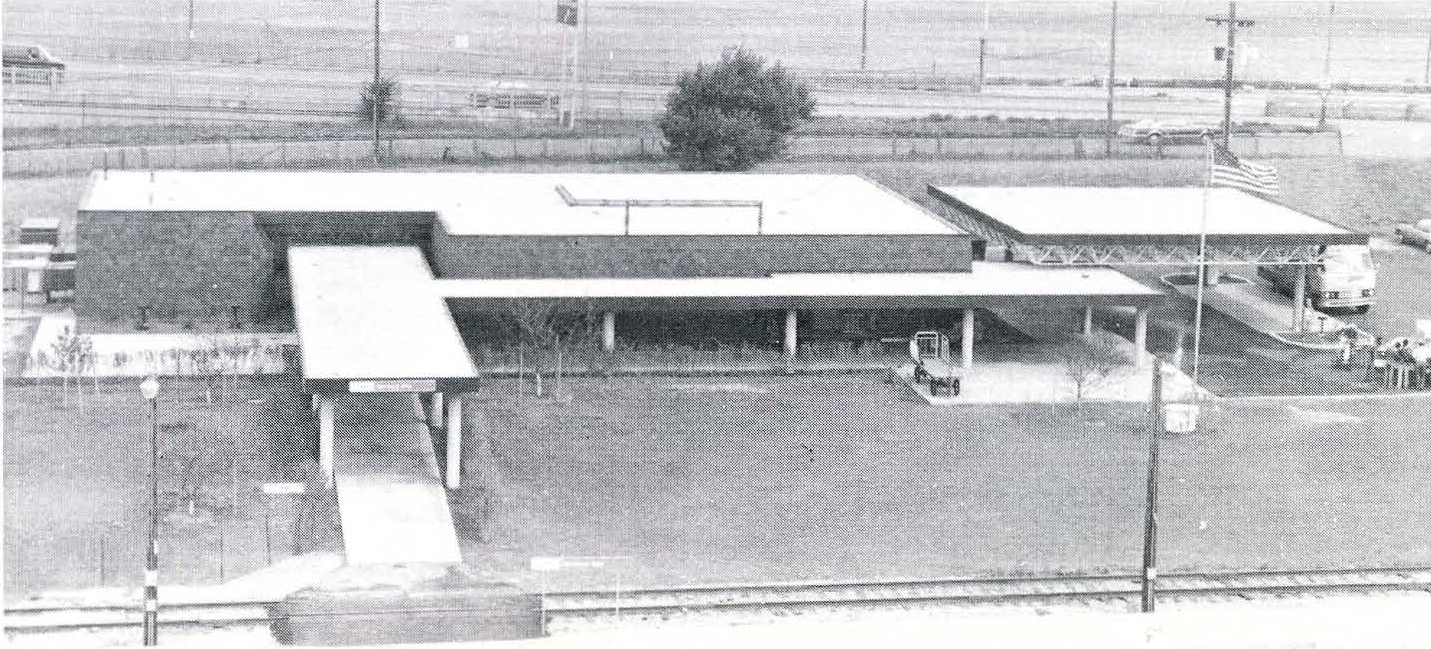
Cleveland Lakefront Station, seen near opening in July 1977, was an early Amtrak attempt to design and build a modern train station.

The first new station Amtrak built was Cincinnati River Road in 1973. Other early attempts by Amtrak to create a modest "modern" station design include the 1975 Richmond Staples Mill Road station and 1977 Cleveland Lakefront station. Amtrak president Paul Reistrup expressed a desire for Amtrak stations to look familiar in each locality.

Amtrak formally outlined its Standard Stations Program in its 1978 Standard Stations Program Executive Summary. The program was intended to amplify a sleek, modern image. It was also intended to foster a unified corporate identity through a consistent "look" and branding, with each standard station using not only one of several similar station building designs, but also the same interior and exterior finishes, signage, and seating. The program's manual outlined the reasoning for such efforts:

Amtrak is not a railroad of the past, but rather, a transportation system of the present and future. We must compete with the airlines and their jetports, the interstate highway system and its convenient and modern service stations and restaurants, and inter-city busses with their new or upgraded terminals.

Our passenger stations are also our only permanent presence in most communities…Amtrak’s public image can be greatly enhanced, or easily destroyed by our facilities.

Unlike the railroads of the past, we have no place for grandiose, monumental stations that cannot be financed by our projected revenues.

Standard designs were seen as cost-efficient, as they would eliminate design costs that would otherwise be incurred with each and every station were they uniquely designed, and would also expedite construction. This was not unprecedented. Past American railroads had sometimes built stations in similarly sized communities to a standardized size and design.

== Station designs ==
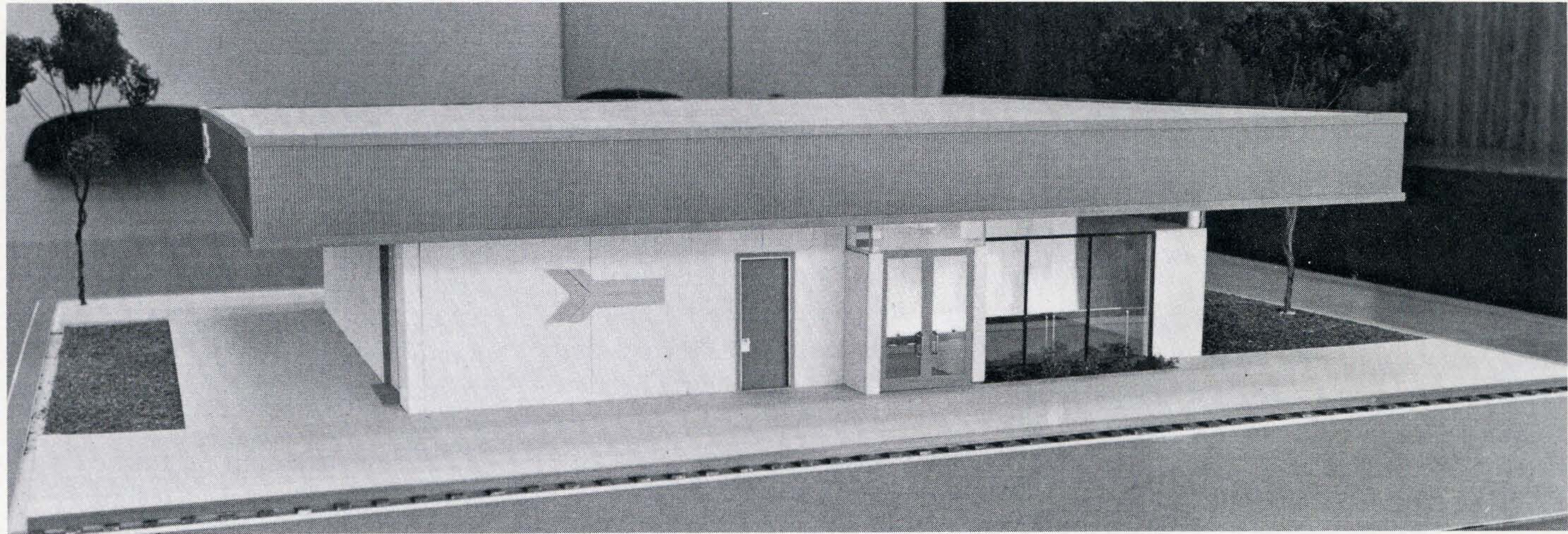
Model of a standard station

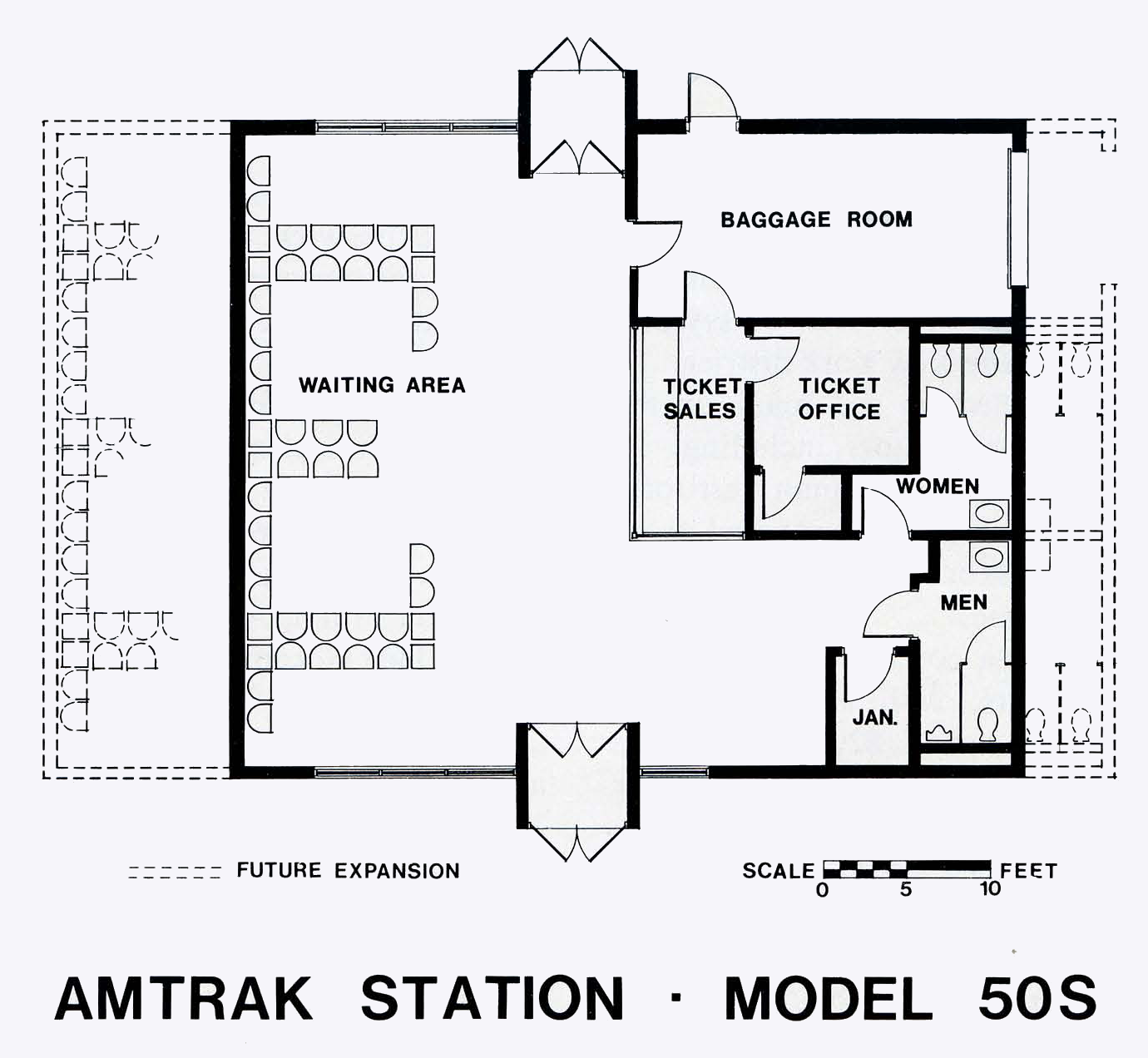
Amtrak model 50S station plans

The station structures were intended to be functional, flexible, and cost-efficient. With spikes in ridership during the 1970s due to oil shortages, there was a perceived potential for permanent ridership gains. Therefore, Amtrak designed the stations to be easily expanded. End walls of the stations were designed to be able to be removed in order to build additions without incurring disruptions to the functioning of the stations.

Designs were mostly rectangular, and all except the largest model were one story. Walls were to be built of either textured, precast concrete panels, split concrete block or brick in what was described as a “play of bronze and tan” colors. A prominent cantilevered, flat black metal roof was to sit atop the buildings, with deep eaves to protect passengers from bad weather. Stations had floor-to-ceiling windows. Often, the top edge of the walls had a band of clerestory windows, which from a distance provided an optical illusion that the roof was floating above the station. The square footage and amenities of stations were to be determined by what their peak hour passenger count was.

Five initial standard station design models were presented with varying ideal sizes and intended capacities:

- Type 300A
  - The largest model was designed to accommodate 300 or more passengers at a time. This design was 18,100 square feet (1,680 m^{2}) and was to be ideally located on a 8.9-acre (3.6 ha) parcel. The two built examples of this design are the Miami and Midway stations.
- Type 150B
  - a 8,220-square-foot (764 m^{2}) station for a peak count of 150–300 passengers, on a five-acre (2 ha) parcel
- Type 50C and 50S
  - a 1,920-square-foot (178 m^{2}) station for a peak count of 50–150 passengers, on a four-acre (1.6 ha) parcel
- Type 25D
  - a 1,150-square-foot (107 m^{2}) station for a peak count of 25–50 passengers, on a two-acre (0.8 ha) site
- Type E
  - an unstaffed station, 240 square feet (22 m^{2}) for a peak count of fewer than 25 passengers, ideally situated on a one-acre (4,000 m^{2}) parcel

Additional design types used included:

- Type 75C, measuring 81 feet (25 m) by 45 feet (14 m), this 3,750 square feet (348 m^{2}) model was designed to accommodate 75 people at a time, with seating for 48. Expandable to accommodate more passengers. The design includes a small lounge, a baggage room, an office, and restrooms. Roughly half of its interior space dedicated to its waiting room.

== Outcome ==
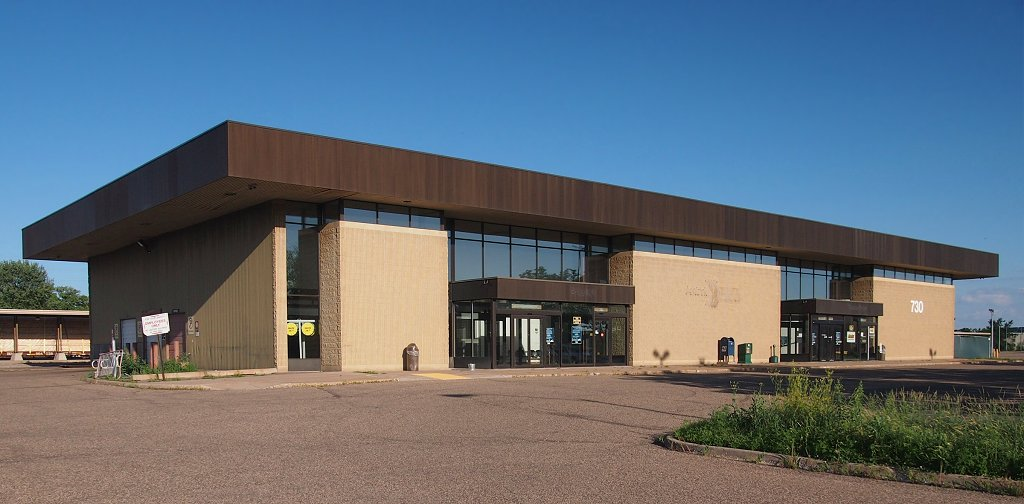
Midway, one of two 300A stations, constructed in 1978

Amtrak constructed standard stations in the 1970s and 1980s, but ultimately built relatively few of them. Strapped for funds, it instead gravitated towards either building even cheaper modular stations or seeking local funding for station development, in some cases even cooperating with private developers. Many "stations" opened in the 1980s and 1990s were very minimal, sometimes lacking any facilities besides a platform and appropriate signage or only featuring simple bus stop-style platform shelters. Many of the standard stations have been replaced with more modern intermodal facilities or replaced by restored service at previously used historic stations from the 2000s onward.

== List of standard stations ==
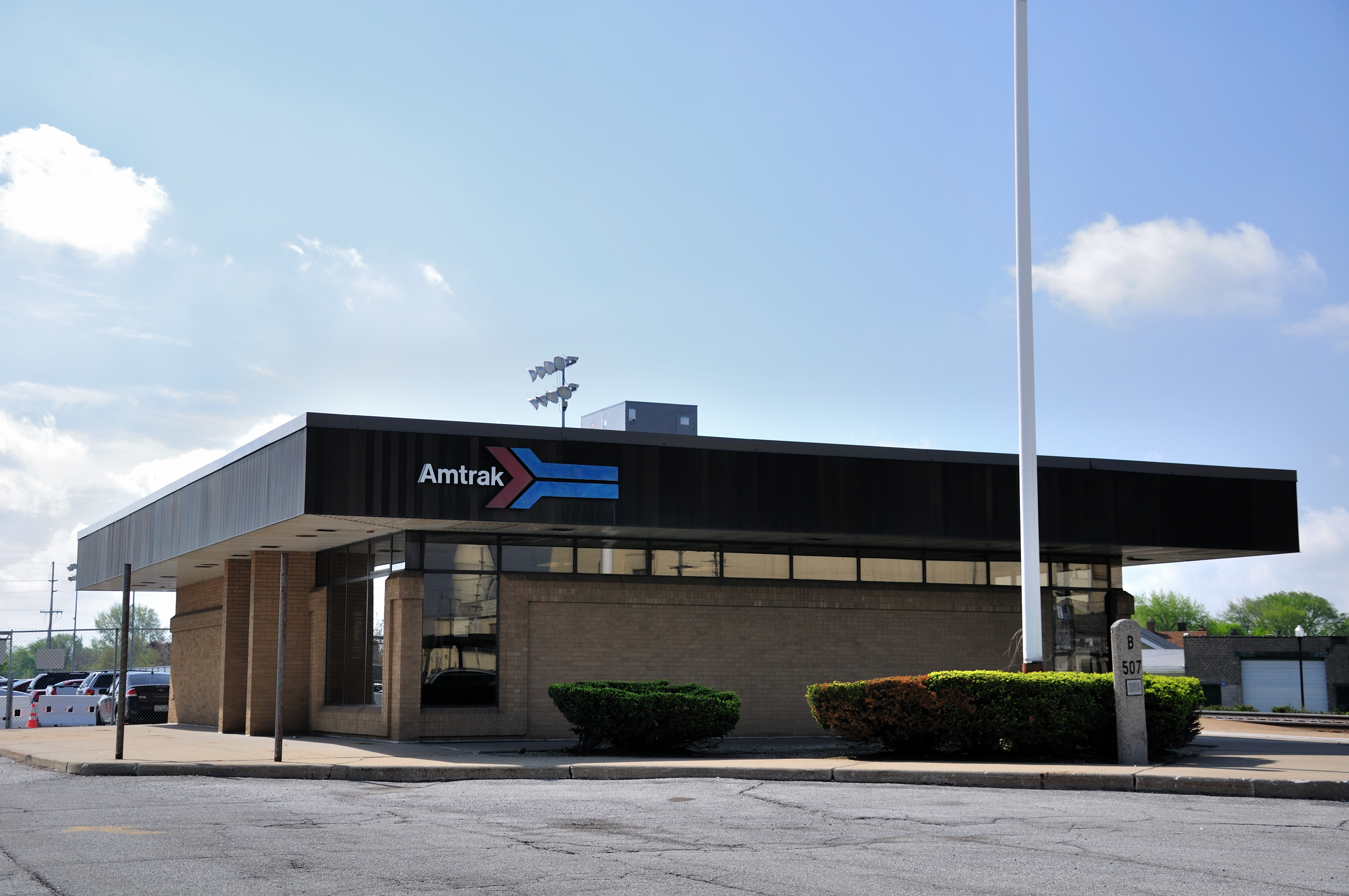
Hammond–Whiting station, constructed in 1982

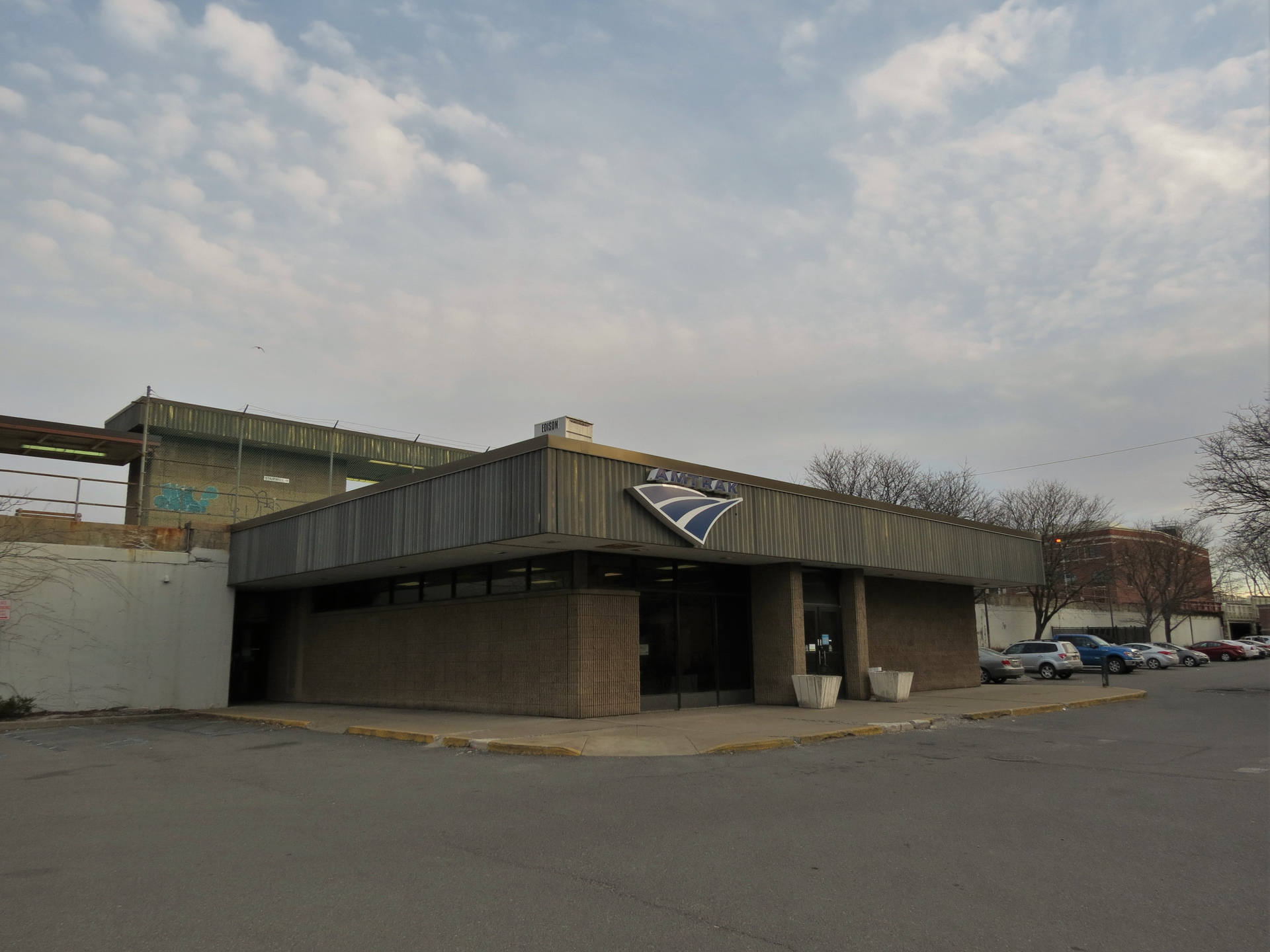

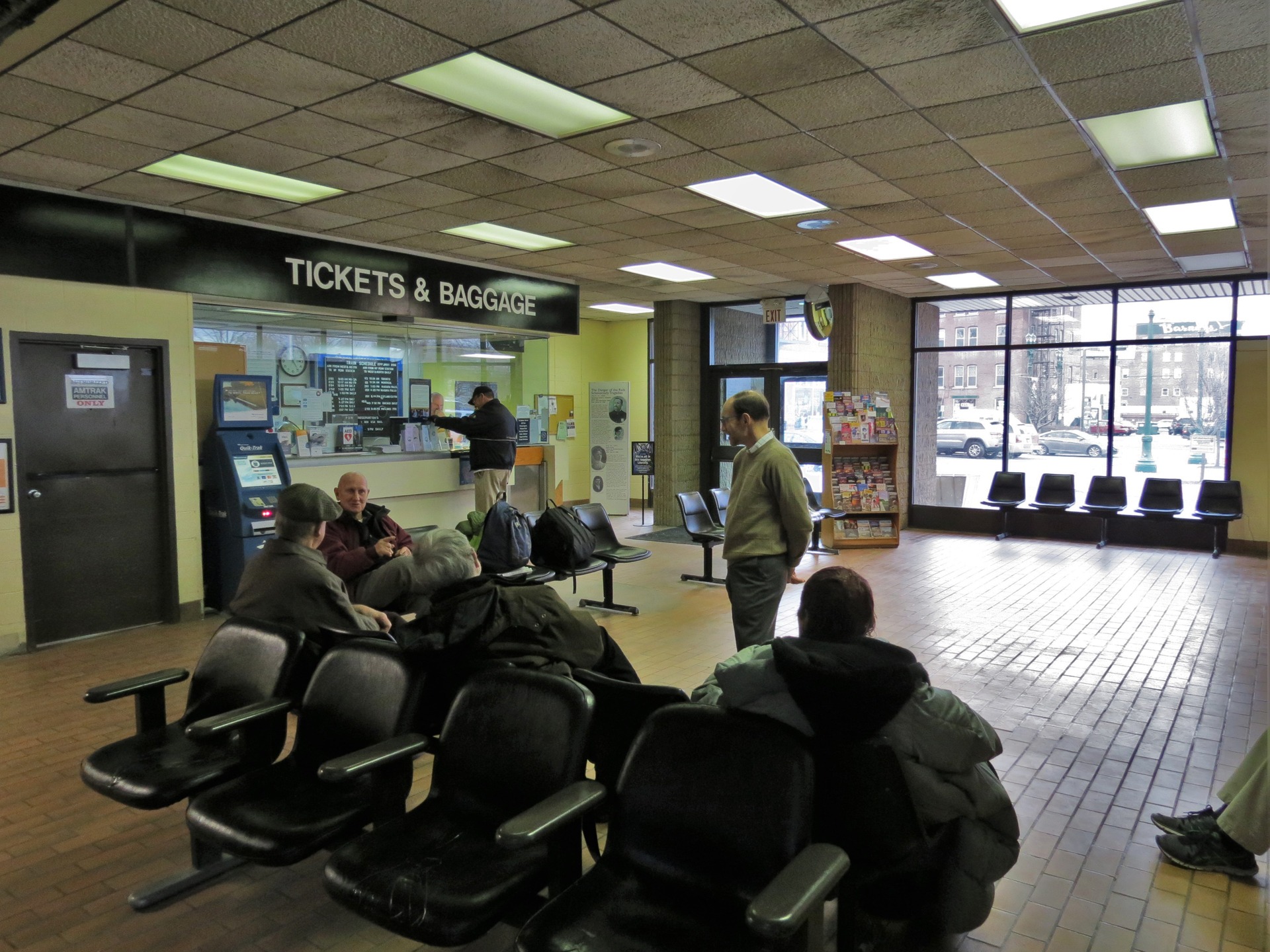
Interior and exterior of the former Schenectady station building, constructed in 1979 and demolished in 2017.

Design	Station Name	City	Opened	Closed	Fate
300A	Miami	Miami, Florida	1978		
300A	Minneapolis–Saint Paul Midway	Saint Paul, Minnesota	1978	2014	Abandoned and replaced by Saint Paul Union Depot. Underwent modifications to be reused as an Amtrak crew base.
150B	Albany–Rensselaer	Rensselaer, New York	1980	2002	Demolished in 2010 after being replaced by an adjacent station.
150B	Rochester	Rochester, New York	1978	2015	Demolished and replaced by Louise M. Slaughter Rochester Station on the same site.
75C	Anaheim–Stadium	Anaheim, California	1984	2014	Demolished after being replaced by nearby Anaheim Regional Transportation Intermodal Center
75C	Ann Arbor	Ann Arbor, Michigan	1983		
75C	Buffalo–Depew	Depew, New York	1979		
75C	Tacoma	Tacoma, Washington	1984	2021	Closed December 17, 2017, and replaced by Tacoma Dome Station. Service was reactivated the following day after the Point Defiance Bypass derailment. The station was abandoned November 18, 2021.
50C	Canton–Akron	Canton, Ohio	1978	1990	Abandoned after trains rerouted via Alliance, Ohio.
50C	Dearborn	Dearborn, Michigan	1979	2014	Demolished after being replaced by the nearby John D. Dingell Transit Center.
50C	Flint	Flint, Michigan	1989		
50C	Grand Forks	Grand Forks, North Dakota	1982		
50C	Hammond–Whiting	Hammond, Indiana	1982		
50C	Huntington station	Huntington, West Virginia	1983		
50C	Normal	Normal, Illinois	1990	2012	Abandoned after being replaced by the adjacent Uptown Station.
50C	Omaha	Omaha, Nebraska	1983		
50C	Schenectady	Schenectady, New York	1979	2017	Demolished and replaced by a new station on same site.
25D	Cumberland	Cumberland, Maryland	c. 1978–1979		

=== Related designs ===
==== Prototype designs ====
- Catlettsburg station – opened 1975
- Cleveland Lakefront Station – opened 1977
- Poinciana station – opened 1974, closed 1975
- Richmond Staples Mill Road station – opened 1975

==== Stations with similar characteristics ====
- Carbondale station – opened 1981, replaced in 2025
- Detroit Baltimore Street station – opened 1994
- Du Quoin station – opened 1989
- Newport News station – opened 1981, replaced in 2024
- Richmond, California station – constructed 1978, replaced 1997
- Trenton Transit Center – rebuilt 1976, replaced 2008

== See also ==
- List of Amtrak stations
