= Alliance station =

Railway station in Alliance, Ohio

Alliance, OH
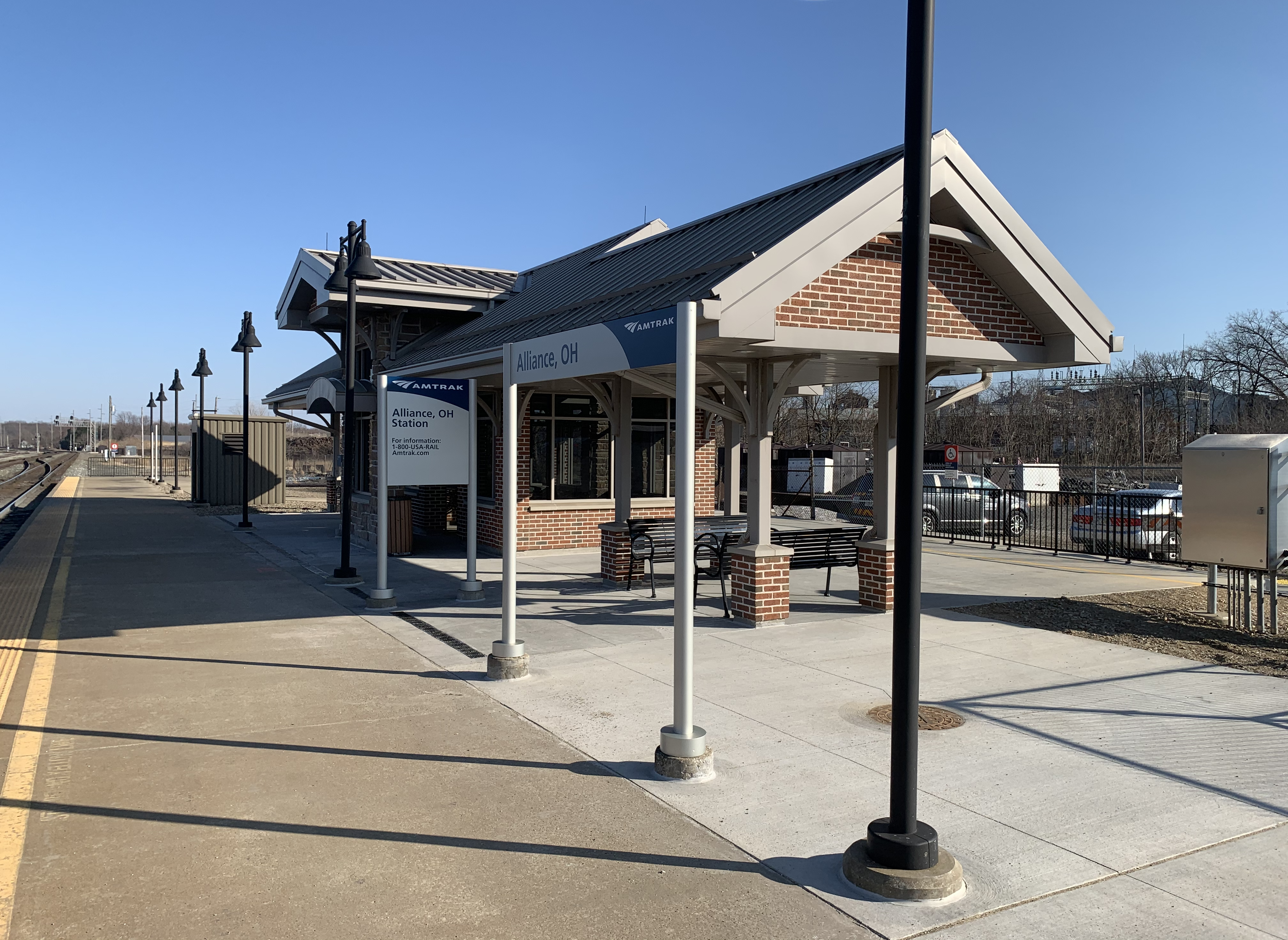
- Alliance station in March 2021

General information
- Location: 820 East Main Street; Alliance, Ohio; United States
- Coordinates: 40.9213°N 81.0930°W
- Owner: Amtrak
- Line: Fort Wayne Line
- Platforms: 1 side platform
- Tracks: 2
- Connections: Stark Area Regional Transit Authority

Construction
- Parking: Yes
- Accessible: Yes

Other information
- Station code: Amtrak: ALC

History
- Opened: October 11, 1990

Passengers
- FY 2025: 4,580 (Amtrak)

Services
Preceding station	Amtrak	Following station
Cleveland toward Chicago	Floridian	Pittsburgh toward Miami
Former services
Preceding station	Pennsylvania Railroad	Following station
Maximo toward Chicago	Main Line	Sebring toward New York or Exchange Place
Limaville toward Cleveland	Cleveland – Pittsburgh via Alliance	Homeworth toward Pittsburgh
Terminus	Alliance – Mahoningtown	Snodes toward Mahoningtown
Preceding station	Amtrak	Following station
Cleveland toward Chicago	Pennsylvanian 1998–2003	Pittsburgh toward Philadelphia
Cleveland toward Chicago	Capitol Limited 1990–2024	Pittsburgh toward Washington, D.C.
Location

Alliance station is an Amtrak train station in Alliance, Ohio, United States. It is served by the daily Floridian service. The station has a single side platform serving the south track of the Fort Wayne Line, with a brick shelter building.

== History ==
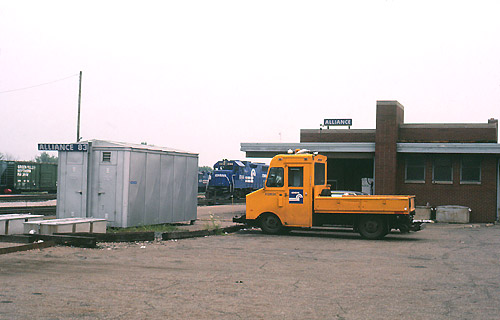
Alliance station in August 1986

The station site in earlier years served Pennsylvania Railroad, then Penn Central passenger trains northwest to Cleveland, west to Detroit, west to Chicago and east to Philadelphia and New York City. Amtrak service began at the station when the Capitol Limited was rerouted north in fall 1990 from Canton station in Canton. The Pennsylvanian served Alliance from 1998 to 2003.

Amtrak spent $1.5 million to improve the station in 2011. It built a new shelter and installed a 550-foot (170 m) long concrete platform, signage and light poles. Developed by d+A Design+Architecture, LLC of Yardley, Pennsylvania, the shelter is composed primarily of rich red brick and has an enclosed, one-story waiting room with large windows. On the facades facing the street and the tracks, the waiting room is marked by stylized projecting bays faced with coursed ashlar stonework that adds texture to the overall elevation. The design is similar to Connellsville station in Pennsylvania. On November 10, 2024, the Capitol Limited was merged with the Silver Star as the Floridian.
