= Merchants Limited =

Train service in the United States

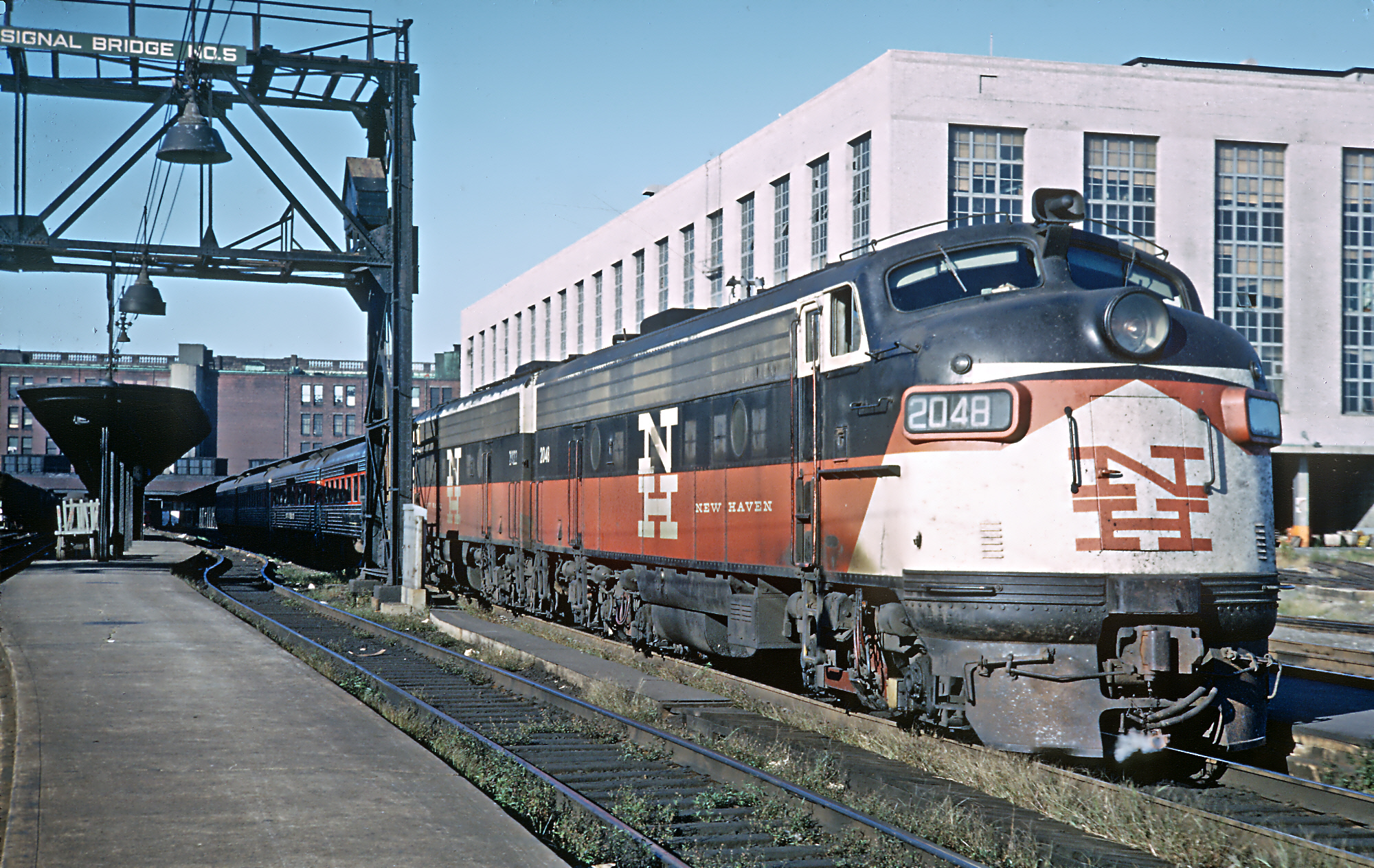
- The Merchants Limited at Boston South Station in 1965

Overview
- Service type: Inter-city rail
- Status: Discontinued
- Locale: Northeastern United States
- First service: December 14, 1903
- Last service: October 28, 1995
- Successor: NortheastDirect services
- Former operator(s): New Haven; Penn Central; Amtrak

Route
- Termini: New York, New York; Boston, Massachusetts
- Distance travelled: 232.0 miles (373.4 km)
- Service frequency: Daily
- Train number(s): 27 (southbound); 28 (northbound)

On-board services
- Seating arrangements: Coaches
- Catering facilities: Dining car (1955)
- Observation facilities: Parlor car

The Merchants Limited, sometimes shortened to Merchants, was a New York, New Haven and Hartford (the "New Haven") passenger train on the Shore Line between Boston and New York City. It was the New Haven's premier passenger train and the last all-parlor car train in the United States. The train entered service in 1903, and survived the turbulent Penn Central merger to become one of Amtrak's Boston–Washington, D.C. services. The name disappeared from Amtrak's timetables in 1995 when most Northeast trains were rebranded "NortheastDirect".

== History ==
The New Haven introduced the Merchants Limited on December 14, 1903. The train offered first class parlor car seating only; amenities included a dining car and private rooms. The trains departed New York and Boston at 5 PM and made the trip between the two cities in five hours. This schedule would be reduced to 4 1/2 hours in 1935, 4 1/4 hours in 1940, and finally 4 hours flat in 1949. This proved unsustainable as conditions deteriorated on the New Haven and would be raised to 4 1/4 hours in 1956.

The New Haven considered the Merchants Limited its premier train and it always ran with the best equipment possible. When it received coaches in May 1949 it was the last all-parlor car train running in the United States. A second section, the Advance Merchants Limited, operated fifteen minutes ahead of the Merchants Limited at various times in the 1950s.

The New Haven was merged on January 1, 1969, into the Penn Central, formed the previous year by the New York Central Railroad and Pennsylvania Railroad. The Penn Central went bankrupt in 1970 and divested itself of its passenger trains in 1971. Amtrak, the new national operator, retained the Merchants Limited, although it would soon be extended through to Washington, D.C. Amtrak dropped individual names from its Northeast Corridor trains, save the Metroliners, on October 28, 1995. The Merchants Limited had long lost its individual character, although it continued to offer first class service.
