= Arkansas City station =

Former train station in Arkansas City, Kansas, US

Arkansas City, KS
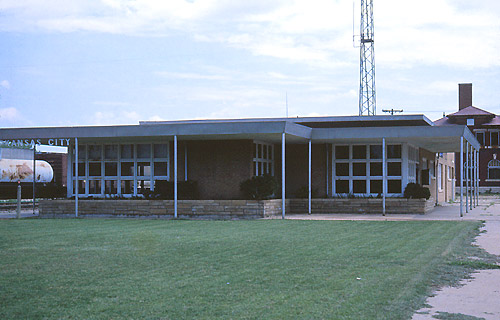
- Arkansas City station in July 1978

General information
- Location: 520 East 5th Ave. Arkansas City, Kansas
- Coordinates: 37.061458°N 97.033094°W
- Line: BNSF Arkansas City Subdivision

History
- Opened: 1888
- Closed: 1979
- Rebuilt: April 27, 1951

Former services
Preceding station	Amtrak	Following station
Ponca City toward Dallas or Houston	Lone Star	Wichita toward Chicago
Preceding station	Atchison, Topeka and Santa Fe Railway	Following station
Chilocco toward Newton	Newton – Purcell	Hackney toward Purcell
Location

Arkansas City station is a former railway station in Arkansas City, Kansas, United States. The original station was built in 1888 by the Atchison, Topeka and Santa Fe Railway. This was demolished in 1950 and replaced by a mid-century modern depot which opened on April 27, 1951. The new station cost $100,000 and was constructed of buff brick and silverdale stone by Martin K. Eby Construction Co., of Wichita.

Amtrak took over intercity passenger service in 1971 and continued serving Arkansas City with the Texas Chief. The Texas Chief was renamed Lone Star in 1974 and discontinued in 1979 leaving Arkansas City without passenger service. Service restoration on the line has been discussed since the Heartland Flyer began service in 1999 from Oklahoma City to Fort Worth. On June 9, 2017 Amtrak served the station as part of a one day inspection tour of the line between Oklahoma City and Kansas City.

In June 2021, Amtrak released a plan that would add two more Heartland Flyer round trips, while extending one round trip to Newton. The extended round trip would bring Amtrak service back to Arkansas City. In November 2023, KDOT said the service would start in 2029, but could begin sooner were the project to be fast tracked. BNSF owns the station and city officials have discussed the possibility of opening the northern end of the building for use once Amtrak service returns to the city.
