= Canton station (Ohio) =

Former rail station in Canton, Ohio, US

Canton–Akron, OH
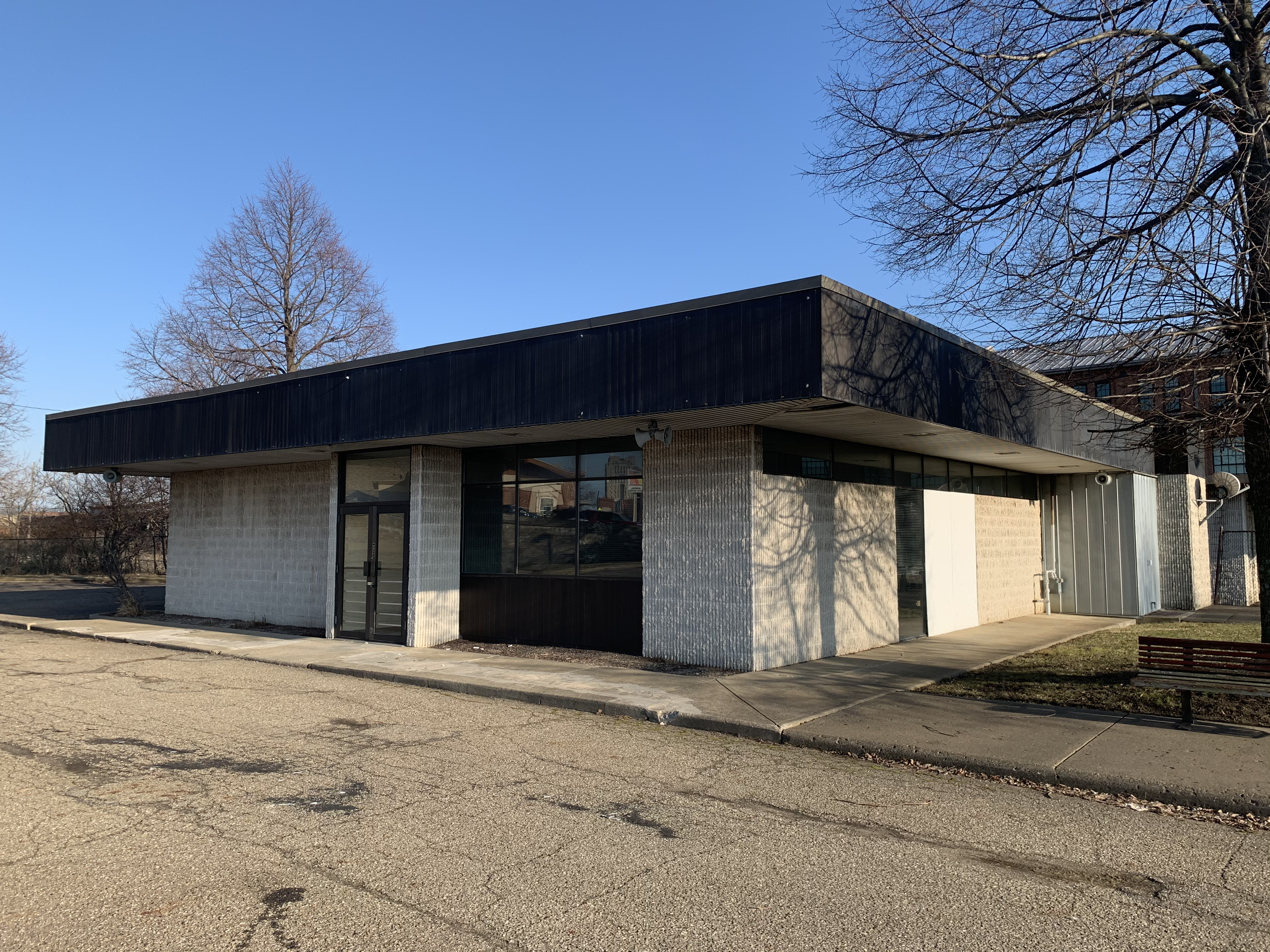
- The former Amtrak station, 2021

General information
- Location: 846 S. Market Ave; Canton, Ohio 44702
- Coordinates: 40.7920°N 81.37666°W
- Platforms: 1 island platform
- Tracks: 3

History
- Closed: 1990
- Rebuilt: 1978

Former services
| Preceding station | Amtrak | Following station |
|---|---|---|
| Crestline toward Chicago | Broadway Limited | Pittsburgh toward New York |
| Crestline toward Chicago | Capitol Limited | Pittsburgh toward Washington, D.C. |
| Preceding station | Pennsylvania Railroad | Following station |
| Massillon toward Chicago | Main Line | Louisville toward New York or Exchange Place |
Location

Canton station, or Canton–Akron station, is a former train station in Canton, Ohio.

== History ==
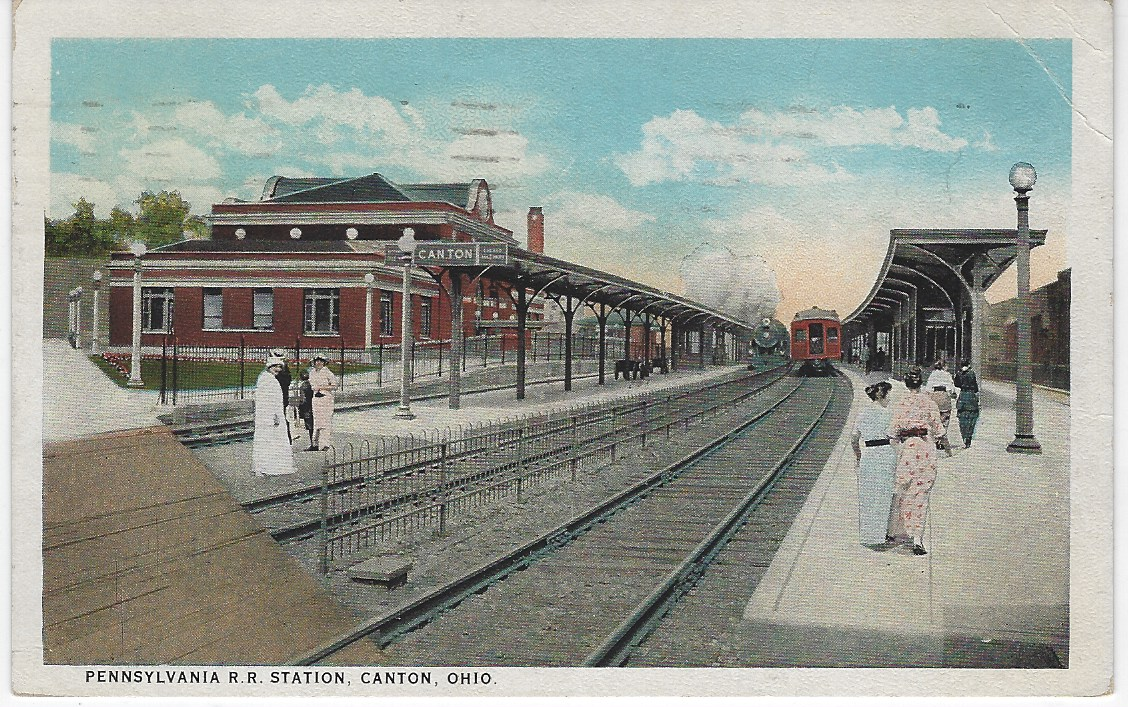
1915 station in early years of use

Canton's Pennsylvania Railroad first station at the site was built in 1915. It served the Pennsylvania Railroad's Chicago–Philadelphia–New York City main line, with Canton being the largest Ohio city on the line. At the mid-century peak, the station served ten trains eastbound to Pittsburgh on the mainline, eight trains westbound on the main line, am and pm trains in both directions on the Detroit–Pittsburgh circuit, daytime departures both directions on an overnight Cincinnati–Columbus–Youngstown–Pittsburgh route. Prestige express trains, such as the PRR's Broadway Limited, did not stop at the station.

Named passenger trains in 1958 included:

- Chicago–New York City: Admiral, General (eastbound only), Manhattan Limited, Pennsylvania Limited
- Chicago–Pittsburgh: Fort Pitt and Golden Triangle
- Detroit–Washington and New York City: Red Arrow (eastbound only)

=== Penn Central era ===
In 1968, the first year of the merged Penn Central, the storied Broadway Limited began making stops at Canton; the other trains serving the station included the Manhattan Limited and the Pennsylvania Limited. An unnamed successor to the Fort Pitt made a westbound only trip through Canton. In 1970 the Penn Central petitioned the Interstate Commerce Commission to drop trains running through the station, among a total of 34 trains to cut. The ICC refused the request, and mandated that the service continue until the national service (the future Amtrak) would pick up the service.

=== Amtrak era ===
The Broadway Limited was the train continuing to serve the station into the Amtrak era. The city of Canton condemned the station and it was demolished in 1976. Amtrak agreed the next year to build a station building for $200,000, of a standard design to accommodate fifty passengers. The new building opened on June 29, 1978, after less than half a year of construction.

Amtrak's Capitol Limited joined the station when the Amtrak incarnation of the train was launched in 1981. Amtrak service with the Broadway Limited and the Capitol Limited at the station ended in 1990 as those trains were rerouted that fall to the north: the Broadway Limited to Akron and the Capitol Limited to Alliance, Ohio.

=== Post abandonment ===
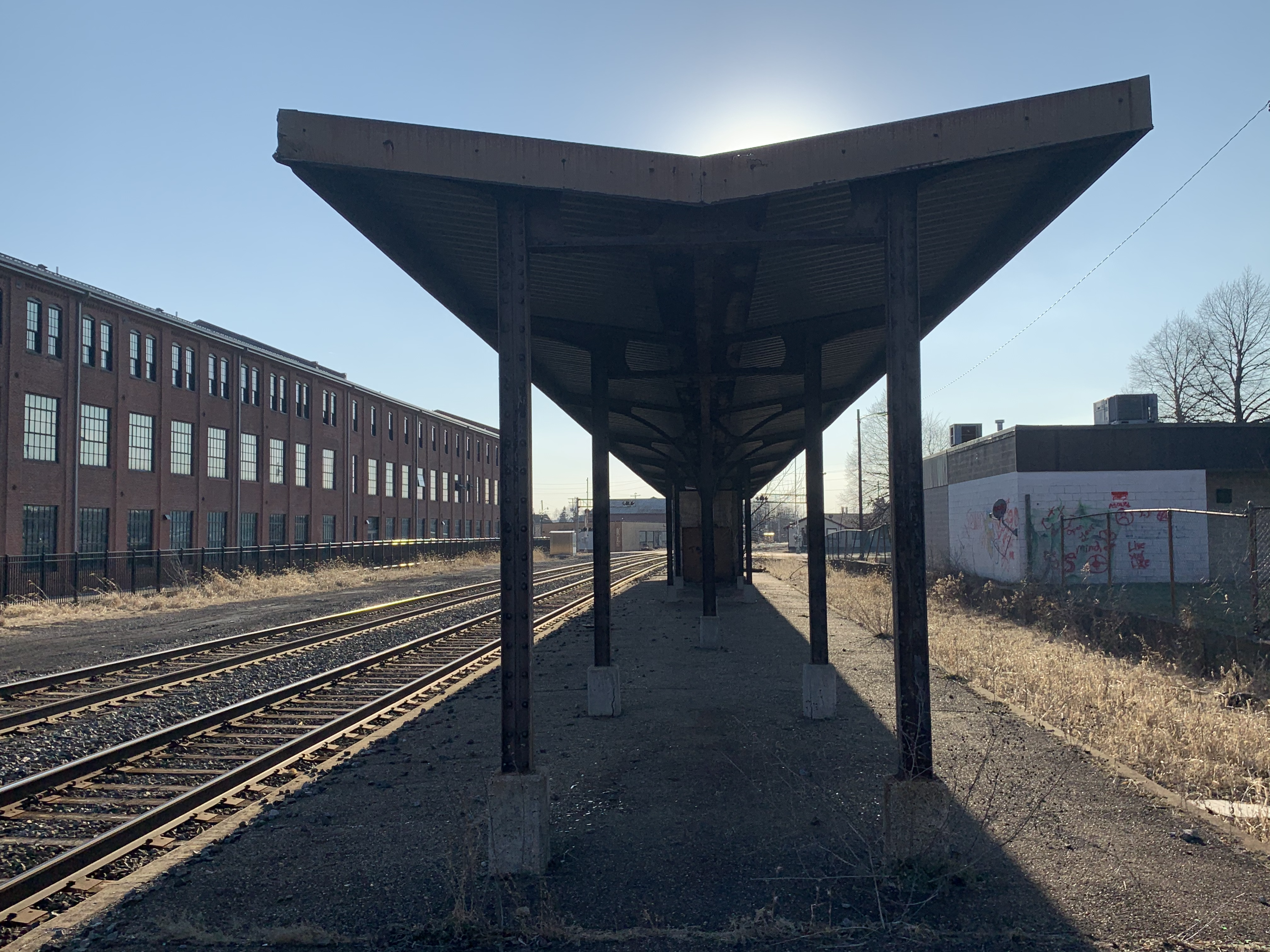
The abandoned station's platform and canopy, 2021

After the station was abandoned, it was used first as a restaurant, then as a convenience store. As of 2022, the station currently sits unused. It was considered for use as part of the proposed Canton streetcar project, but ultimately ruled out.
