= Fostoria station =

Train station in Fostoria, Ohio, U.S.

Fostoria, OH
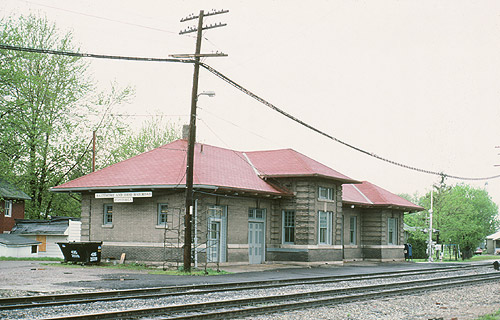
- Fostoria station in May 1983

General information
- Location: 500 South Main Street; Fostoria, Ohio
- Coordinates: 41.1528°N 83.4138°W
- Line: CSX Willard Subdivision

History
- Opened: March 1907 (B&O); November 10, 1990 (Amtrak); December 15, 1997
- Closed: 1971; September 9, 1995; March 7, 2005

Former services
Preceding station	Amtrak	Following station
Nappanee toward Chicago	Three Rivers	Akron toward New York
Garrett toward Chicago	Broadway Limited	Akron toward New York
Preceding station	Baltimore and Ohio Railroad	Following station
Garrett toward Chicago	Main Line	Akron–Union toward Jersey City
Galatea toward Chicago	Main Line	Tiffin toward Jersey City
Location

Fostoria station is a former train station in Fostoria, Ohio.

== History ==
The station building was constructed by the Baltimore and Ohio Railroad. It opened in March 1907. Baltimore and Ohio services ended in 1971.

When Amtrak rerouted the Broadway Limited in 1990, Fostoria was selected as a stop on the line. The city pledged $65,000 (equivalent to $160,182 in 2025) to refurbish the station, platform, and parking lot for the new service. The Broadway Limited served the station between 1990 and 1995. Amtrak again reactivated the stop on December 15, 1997, for the Three Rivers. Passenger service finally ceased in 2005.
