= Ponca City station =

Historic train station in Oklahoma

Ponca City, OK
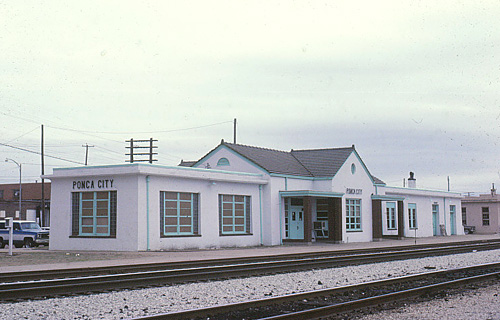
- The depot in 1985

General information
- Location: Near junction of S. 1st & W. Oklahoma; Ponca City, Oklahoma
- Coordinates: 36°42′06″N 97°05′02″W

History
- Opened: 1895
- Closed: October 8, 1979
- Rebuilt: 1911

Former Services
Preceding station	Amtrak	Following station
Perry toward Dallas or Houston	Lone Star	Arkansas City toward Chicago
Preceding station	Atchison, Topeka and Santa Fe Railway	Following station
Guthrie toward Newton	Newton – Purcell	Arkansas City toward Purcell
Bodock toward Hutchinson	Hutchinson – Ponca City	Terminus
- Santa Fe Depot
- U.S. National Register of Historic Places
- NRHP reference No.: 12000113
- Added to NRHP: March 12, 2012
Location

Ponca City station is a former and proposed railway station in Ponca City, Oklahoma.

== History ==
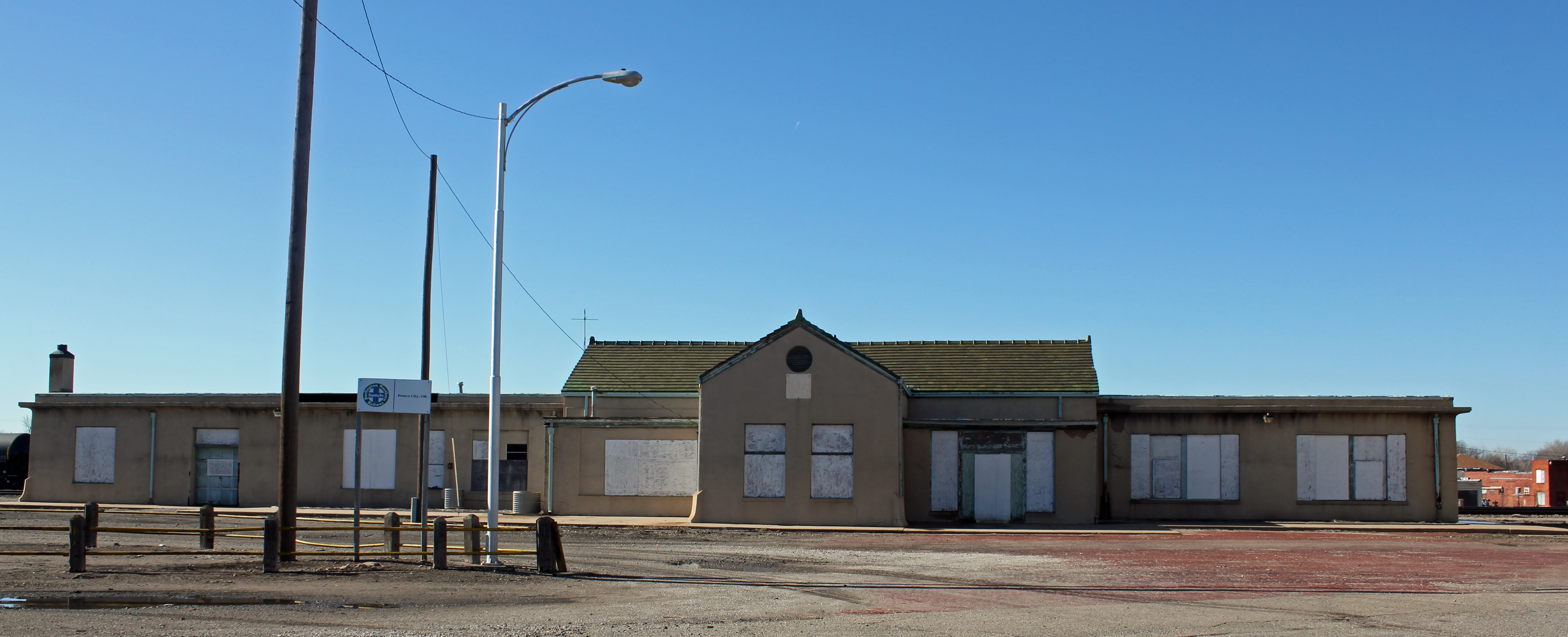
Ponca City Santa Fe Depot, 2013

The Santa Fe Railway originally skipped building a depot in Ponca City, with locals using the nearby station at Cross for trips. Arrangements were made by local boosters to have the Cross stationmaster move the depot to a more convenient location. The original station at the site was a simple boxcar. The first station building was built in 1885.

Celebrations planned to accompany the opening of the new depot in 1911 were called off by the Santa Fe. The new depot would go on to open May 24. Amtrak service ceased on October 1, 1979 with the discontinuation of the Lone Star. It was added to the National Register of Historic Places on March 12, 2012.

In anticipation of the return of Amtrak services to the city via the Heartland Flyer, Ponca City undertook to rehabilitate the station with renovations beginning in February 2025. The estimated cost of the project is $3.2 million. A ribbon-cutting marking the completion of the project was held on August 6, 2026.
