= Akron station (Amtrak) =

Akron, OH
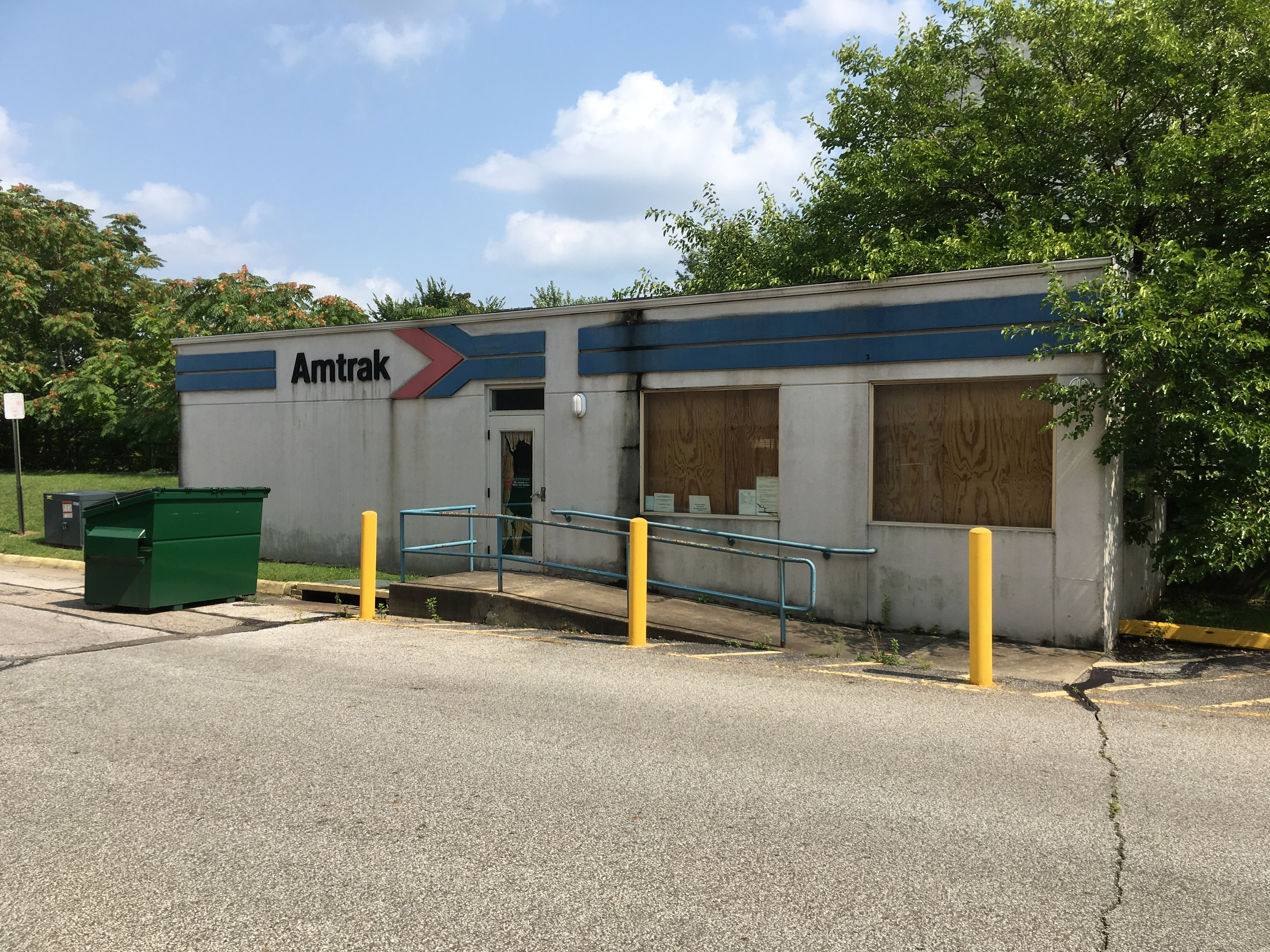
- Former Akron Amtrak station.

General information
- Location: 96 East Bowery Street, Akron, Ohio
- Coordinates: 41°04′48″N 81°30′56″W
- Owner: Amtrak
- Platforms: 1 (former)
- Tracks: 2

Other information
- Station code: AKO

History
- Opened: November 10, 1990; August 10, 1998
- Closed: September 10, 1995; March 7, 2005

Former services
Preceding station	Amtrak	Following station
Fostoria toward Chicago	Three Rivers 1998–2005	Youngstown toward New York
Fostoria toward Chicago	Broadway Limited 1990–1995	Youngstown toward New York
Location

Akron station is a former Amtrak station located at Quaker Square in Akron, Ohio. The station was served by Amtrak passenger trains during the 1990s and 2000s.

== History ==
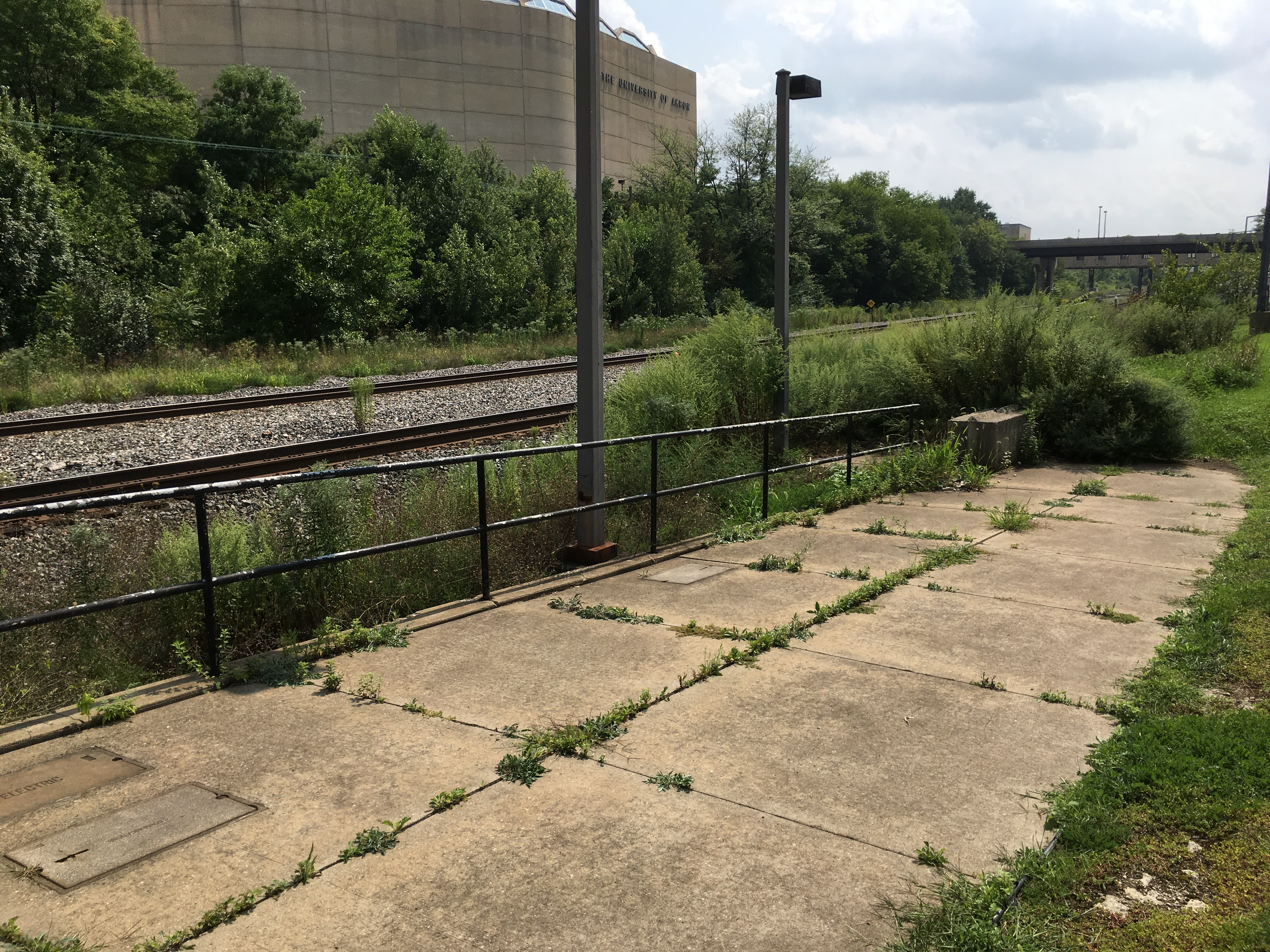
Ramp to former passenger platform

The former Akron Union Station, slightly to the south, was closed in 1971 when Amtrak did not include a Washington-Chicago train on the Baltimore and Ohio Railroad (B&O) as part of its initial route structure. On November 10, 1990, the Broadway Limited was rerouted from the ex-Pennsylvania Railroad Fort Wayne Line to the ex-B&O. Union Station had been reused by the University of Akron; Amtrak used part of the former platform and constructed a modular station building at Quaker Square.

The New York-Chicago Broadway Limited was replaced with the New York-Pittsburgh Three Rivers on September 10, 1995, ending service to Akron. The Three Rivers was extended to Chicago through Akron on November 10, 1996; however, Amtrak and the city disagreed over who would pay for necessary repairs to the station. Akron station reopened on August 10, 1998 – the last of several ex-Broadway stops to be restored. The Three Rivers was cut back to Pittsburgh as the Pennsylvanian on March 7, 2005, ending service to Akron again.

== See also ==
- List of former Amtrak stations
