= Nappanee station =

Former train station in Indiana, United States

Nappanee, IN
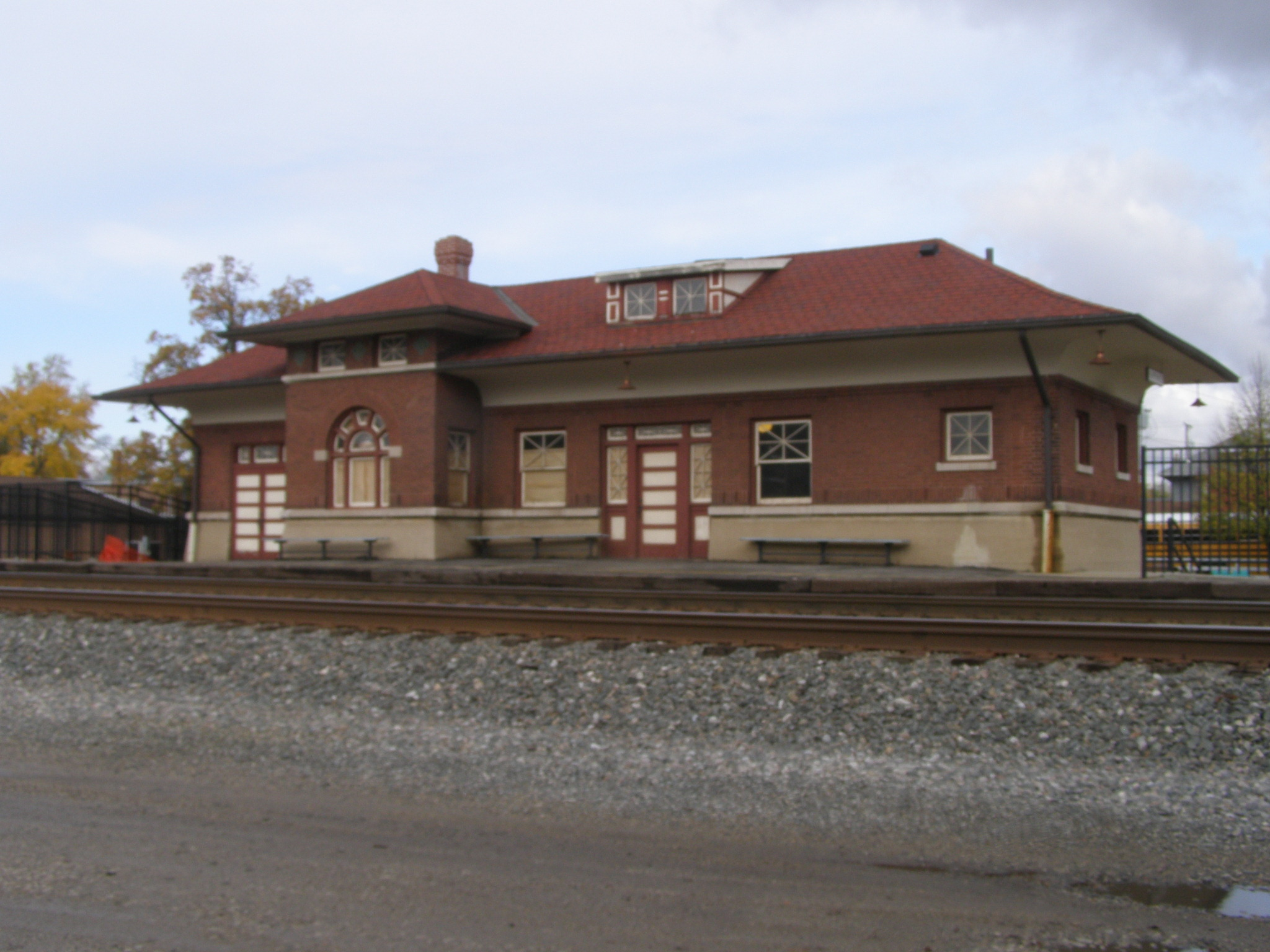

General information
- Location: 252 South Main Street; Nappanee, Indiana 46550
- Coordinates: 41.4410°N 86.0022°W
- Lines: Baltimore and Ohio Railroad; CSX
- Platforms: 1 side platform
- Tracks: 2

History
- Opened: 1874 (B&O); November 10, 1990 (Amtrak); November 10, 1996
- Closed: c. 1969 (B&O); September 10, 1995; March 7, 2005
- Rebuilt: 1910

Former services
Preceding station	Amtrak	Following station
Hammond–Whiting toward Chicago	Three Rivers	Fostoria toward New York
Hammond–Whiting toward Chicago	Broadway Limited	Garrett toward New York
Preceding station	Baltimore and Ohio Railroad	Following station
Miller toward Chicago	Main Line	Garrett toward Jersey City
Syracuse toward Chicago	Main Line	Breman toward Jersey City
Location

Nappanee station is a former railway station in Nappanee, Indiana.

== History ==
The Baltimore and Ohio Railroad constructed the rail line through what would become Nappanee in 1874. The stop was originally a simple wood-framed structure, referred to as Locke-Eby after the nearby town of Locke. The current station building was constructed in 1910 in the Prairie School architecture style. Passenger trains ceased serving the town around 1969 with the discontinuance of the Washington–Chicago Express.

Nappanee became a stop on the Broadway Limited when Amtrak rerouted the train over the former Baltimore and Ohio Main Line in 1990. The town was selected as a stop due to the adjacent parking lot which was owned by the city. This route was discontinued in 1995. Nappanee again became an Amtrak stop when the Three Rivers's western terminus was extended from Pittsburgh to Chicago on November 10, 1996. Service finally ended on March 7, 2005. It has since become home for a local food pantry, named Nappanee Open Door.

The depot underwent restoration in the early 2000s.
