= Garrett station =

US rail station

Garrett, IN
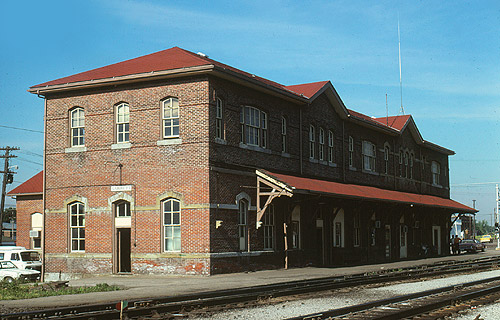
- The station building in 1978

General information
- Location: 300 North Randolph Street; Garrett, Indiana
- Coordinates: 41.3527°N 85.1361°W

History
- Opened: c. 1875; November 10, 1990 (Amtrak)
- Closed: April 30, 1971; September 9, 1995 (Amtrak)
- Original company: Baltimore and Ohio Railroad

Former services
Preceding station	Amtrak	Following station
Nappanee toward Chicago	Broadway Limited	Fostoria toward New York
Preceding station	Baltimore and Ohio Railroad	Following station
Nappanee toward Chicago	Main Line	Fostoria toward Jersey City
Albion toward Chicago	Main Line	Hicksville toward Jersey City
Location

Garrett station was a railway station in Garrett, Indiana.

== History ==
The town of Garrett was established by the Baltimore and Ohio Railroad when the line was extended here in 1875. The station was named after John Garret, then President of the B&O. The station would be served by several of the company's named trains, including the Diplomat, Capitol Limited, and Washington–Chicago Express. Service ended in 1971 when the Capitol Limited was discontinued.

The station became a stop on the Amtrak Broadway Limited on November 10, 1990, when the service was rerouted over the former Baltimore and Ohio line through Ohio and Indiana. Amtrak Thruway bus service provided a link to Fort Wayne, which was one of the cities bypassed—this operated until April 2, 1995. Passenger service ended with the discontinuation of the Broadway Limited on September 9, 1995. The station building was demolished that same year.
