= Fast Mail (Amtrak train) =

The Fast Mail was a train operated by Amtrak from Washington, D.C. to Boston and Springfield, Massachusetts, numbered #12 (northbound) and 13 (southbound). Train 12 carried both passengers and mail while train 13 carried mail and freight only.

At New Haven a separate train ran to and from Springfield (412/413). Train 12 departed Washington daily at 3:00am while 13 departed Springfield/Boston in the early morning. In 2002, train 13 was canceled and 12 became 190, without mail and express service.

On November 23, 1996, the northbound Fast Mail derailed on Portal Bridge near New York City, sideswiping the southbound Carolinian and causing 43 injuries.
