= Ronceverte station =

Former railway station in West Virginia, United States

Ronceverte
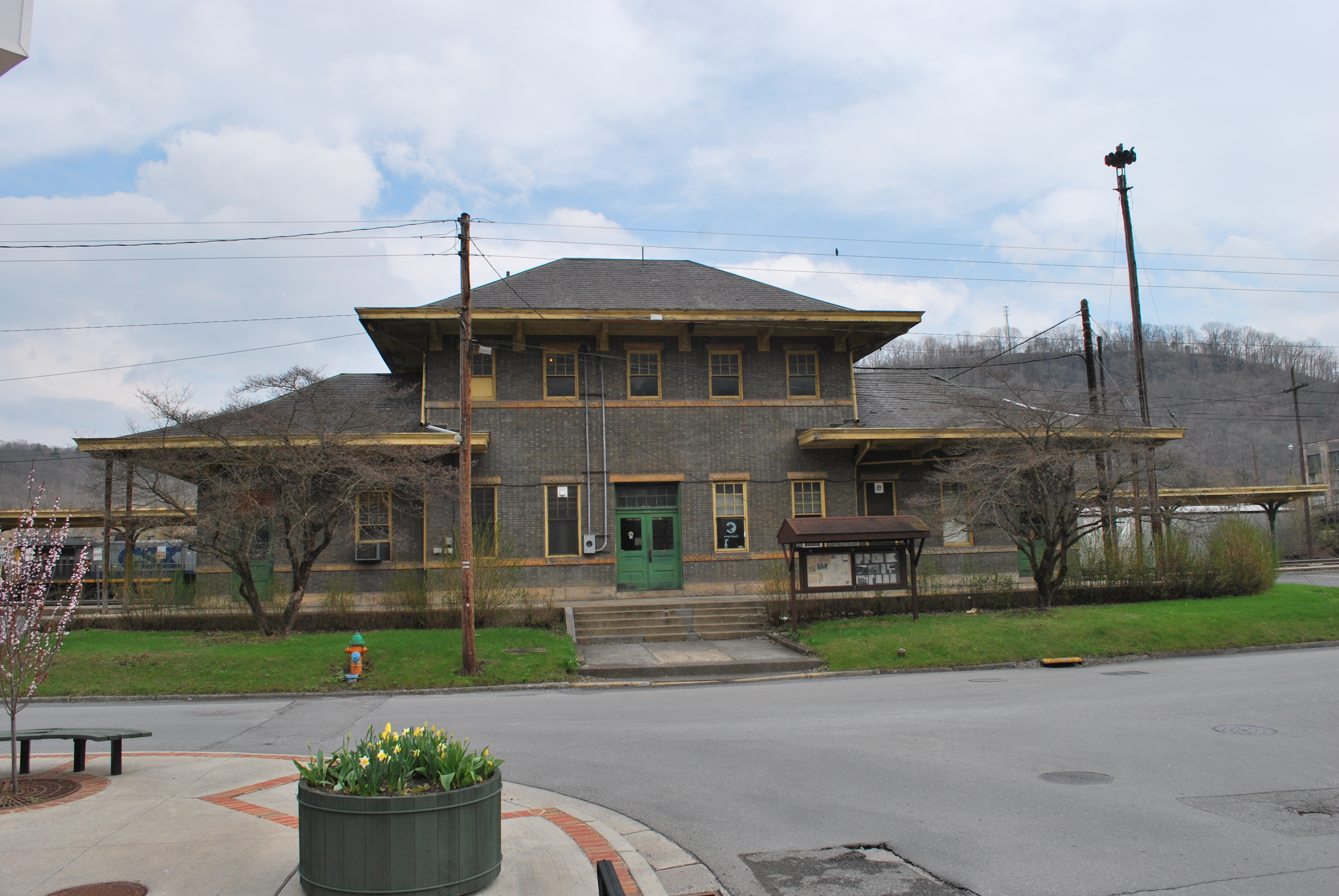
- The depot on April 11, 2009.

General information
- Other names: Chesapeake and Ohio Railway station
- Location: 606 Edgar Avenue; Ronceverte, West Virginia; United States
- Coordinates: 37.748753°N 80.464508°W
- Owner: CSX Transportation
- Line: Alleghany Subdivision
- Platforms: 1 side platform
- Tracks: 1

Construction
- Structure type: At-grade
- Accessible: No
- Architectural style: American Craftsman

History
- Opened: 1873
- Closed: 1971
- Rebuilt: 1891, 1915
- Original company: Chesapeake and Ohio Railway

Former services
Preceding station	Chesapeake and Ohio Railway	Following station
Alderson toward Cincinnati	Main Line	White Sulphur Springs toward Washington, D.C. or Phoebus
Terminus	Greenbrier Division	Whitcomb toward Durbin
Location

The Chesapeake and Ohio Railway Depot in Ronceverte, West Virginia is a historic train station built in 1915 and is part of the Ronceverte Historic District. The depot stopped serving to passengers when Amtrak started operation on May 1, 1971, and discontinued services to the station, although the line still has the Cardinal using the route. Currently, the depot serves as an office for CSX, the latter of which is restoring the station at the cost of $500,000.

== History ==
Ronceverte was welcomed by railroad services on January 28, 1873, when the C&O Main Line between White Sulphur Springs and Huntington was completed. During the early 20th Century, Ronceverte became an important commercial center in the Greenbrier Valley. This led to a growth in population in the town along with businesses.

The first depot was built in 1891, with 12,518 passengers being ticketed through the station along with 27,870 tons of freight being shipped through the station in the 1890s. In 1899, the C&O built a branch line from Ronceverte up to Cass and Durbin for use in the logging industry up in these towns. In 1906, the station had 42,780 passengers ticketing through the station and billed out 37,927 tons of freight.

=== Current station ===
Owing to the increasing ridership at Ronceverte, the 1891 depot reached near-capacity, necessitating the construction of a new depot. Consequently, the C&O presented blueprints for the new depot to the town on May 2, 1910.The council appointed Ronceverte Mayor J. A. Jackson, S. L. Jackson and Powhatan Alexander “P.A.” George as a committee to assist with this project. A new location was proposed for the use of 10 feet of Rail Road Avenue north side between Pine and Chestnut Street for depot purposes and new passenger station. On June 10, 1913, the city council authorized the mayor and city clerk to execute contracts in conformity therewith, when the C&O Railway Company should agree to act as agent for the city of Ronceverte in constructing the two railroad bridges, and should further state when and where the new passenger station should be erected. Original plans were for a wooden structure, but plans changed for the station to be built in brick craftsman style. With the plans finalized, the current American Craftsman style station opened in 1915, with more than 65,000 passengers passing through its doors in the first year it was built.

== Passenger services, decline, and current times ==
When the depot opened in 1915, there was a total of 12 trains serving the station. That being six through and local trains on the main line and four trains on the Greenbrier Branch. In the 1930s passenger trains on the Greenbrier Branch were replaced by gasoline powered Doodlebugs, which lasted until 1958. Although the George Washington did not stop at Ronceverte when it was inaugurated in 1932, it did stop at Ronceverte in its final years after the Fast Flying Virginian was discontinued in 1968.

By 1944, only ten trains were serving the station compared to 12 before 1930. This dropped to four trains by 1958, after passenger service on the Greenbrier Branch was discontinued. In 1962, two of the four trains were discontinued, leaving only the FFV serving Ronceverte until was discontinued in 1968 and the George Washington now stopping at Ronceverte.

The final blow came on May 1, 1971, when Amtrak took over all passenger operations in the United States, and chose not to serve Ronceverte, despite retaining the George Washington and merging it with the James Whitcomb Riley. The George Washington itself lost its name in 1974 after merging with the James Whitcomb Riley. The Riley itself would become the Cardinal in 1977, which still uses the route to this day, although not stopping at Ronceverte. Nearest passenger stations that are being served on the C&O Main by the Cardinal include Alderson which is 13 miles away and White Sulphur Springs which is 13.5 miles away.

Currently, the depot is used by CSX as an office for its employees. CSX also has started a $500,000 project on restoring the station, which is 107 years old. The depot itself has also hosted a one-of-a-kind train show on May 7, 2022, called The Red Matheny Train show which highlights railroad history in the county and its connections to Ronceverte. The show itself is named after Jim “Red” Matheny, who was a key figure in building the C&O railroad, while he worked at the Ronceverte train station. The event itself had local vendors, model train displays and layouts, and concessions which lasted from 9:00 AM to 4:00 PM for a total of 7 hours.

=== Historic services ===
- Fast Flying Virginian
- George Washington (after 1968)
- Sportsman
- Greenbrier Branch Line Service (ended 1958)
