= Summers County Courthouse =

- U.S. National Register of Historic Places
- U.S. Historic district – Contributing property
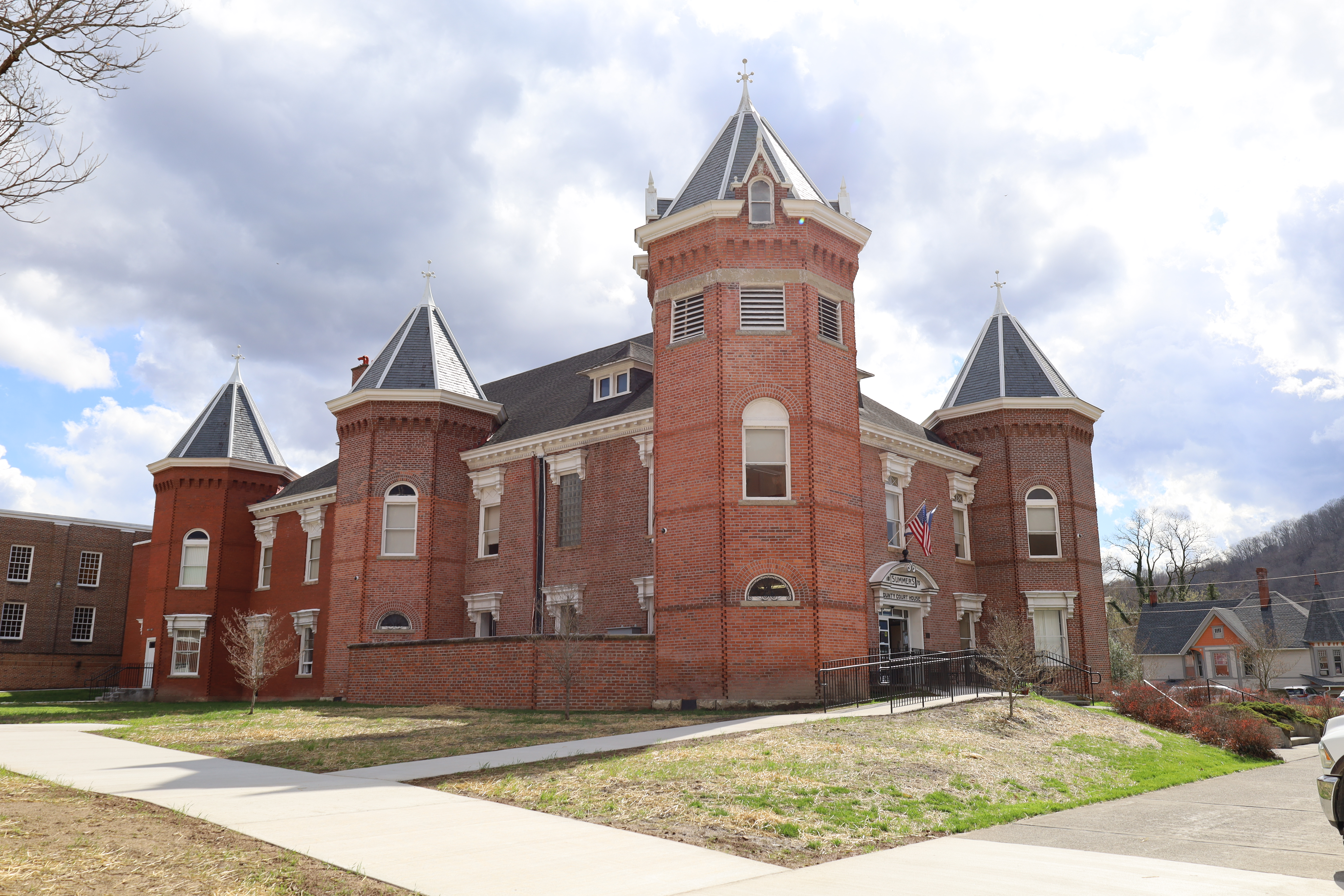
- The courthouse in 2022

- Location within West Virginia Location within the United States
- Interactive map showing the location of Summers County Courthouse
- Location: 120 Ballengee St., Hinton, West Virginia
- Coordinates: 37°40′20″N 80°53′29″W
- Built: 1876
- Architect: Frank P. Milburn, John C. McDonald
- Architectural style: Late Victorian
- Part of: Hinton Historic District (ID84003670)
- NRHP reference No.: 81000608

Significant dates
- Added to NRHP: March 2, 1981
- Designated CP: February 17, 1984

The Summers County Courthouse in Hinton, West Virginia, is a red brick Romanesque Revival or late Victorian building, originally constructed in 1875–76. The building was remodeled between 1893 and 1898 by architect Frank Pierce Milburn, who added octagonal turrets at the corners. A 1923 addition followed suit with another square with two towers. A plan 1930s addition followed. A cast-iron stairway in the northwest tower ascends to the courtroom.

The Putnam County Courthouse uses a similar arrangement of turrets around a square mass.
