= Greenbrier Presidential Express =

American luxury passenger train project

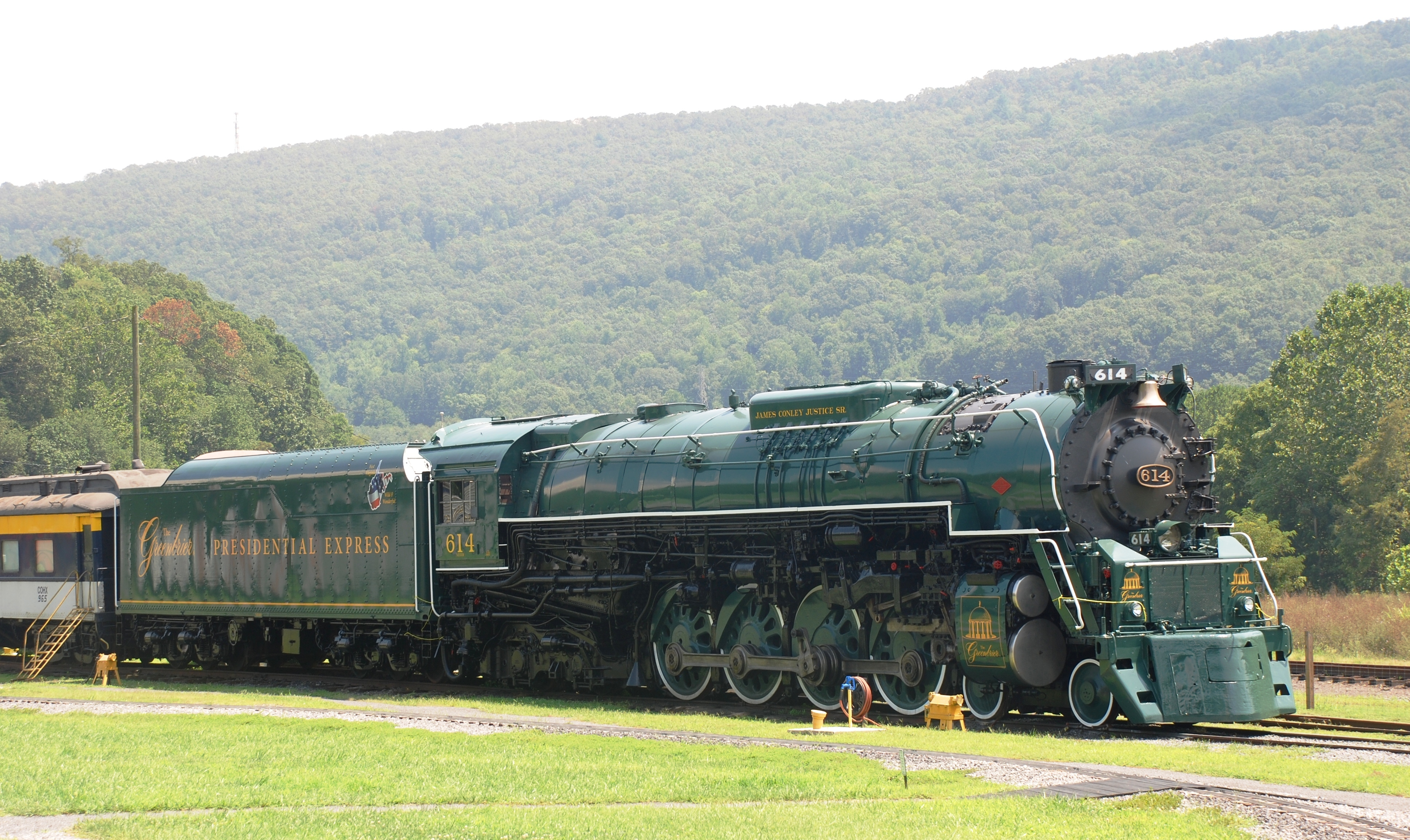
Chesapeake and Ohio 614 refurbished and painted as Greenbrier Presidential Express

The Greenbrier Presidential Express was a proposed luxury passenger train that was planned to operate between Union Station in Washington, D.C., United States, and the train station at the Greenbrier resort in White Sulphur Springs, West Virginia. The project was initiated in June 2011 but canceled in May 2012 due to numerous issues, among which were capacity constraints on the Buckingham Branch Railroad and Federal approval of the train's engineering.

== History ==
Following his purchase of The Greenbrier resort in his native West Virginia, billionaire coal entrepreneur Jim Justice launched a number of new initiatives aimed at reinvigorating the struggling property, including significant renovations, the Greenbrier Classic PGA Tour event, and the construction of a casino. He unveiled concept drawings for the Greenbrier Presidential Express, designed to bring guests to and from the resort, at a June 2011 launch party in Washington, D.C.

Efforts to prepare for the new train began with a $15 million investment by Justice to purchase and rehabilitate 15 passenger cars at a plant in Pennsylvania. The train's consist was to have been made up of baggage cars, club cars, and dining cars offering Greenbrier-style luxury. Most cars were to be named after presidents who summered at the resort. The decor for these cars was being supervised by interior designer Carleton Varney, the student of the woman behind the Greenbrier's signature style, Dorothy Draper. Deluxe cocktails would have been served during the 6-hour journey, and plans called for a registered nurse to be on hand to serve the passengers and plan treatments at the resort's spa and medical facilities. Upon arrival, guests would be met by horse-drawn carriages at the station and conveyed across the street to the resort's main building.

4-8-4 steam locomotive No. 614, formerly used by the Chesapeake and Ohio Railway was painted in Greenbrier Presidential Express livery intended to eventually serve as the power for the train, it was displayed at Clifton Forge, VA to promote the train.

Trains magazine reported in January 2012 that the future of the Presidential Express was in doubt due to capacity problems on the Buckingham Branch Railroad, a problem also affecting plans to make Amtrak's Cardinal (which also serves White Sulphur Springs) a daily train.

As of May 2012, the Greenbrier Presidential Express project was canceled. Most employees were laid off, and numerous rail cars and locomotives were placed for sale, with the rolling stock scheduled for auction on September 18, 2014.
