= Hinton Historic District =

Historic district in West Virginia, United States

- U.S. National Register of Historic Places
- U.S. Historic district
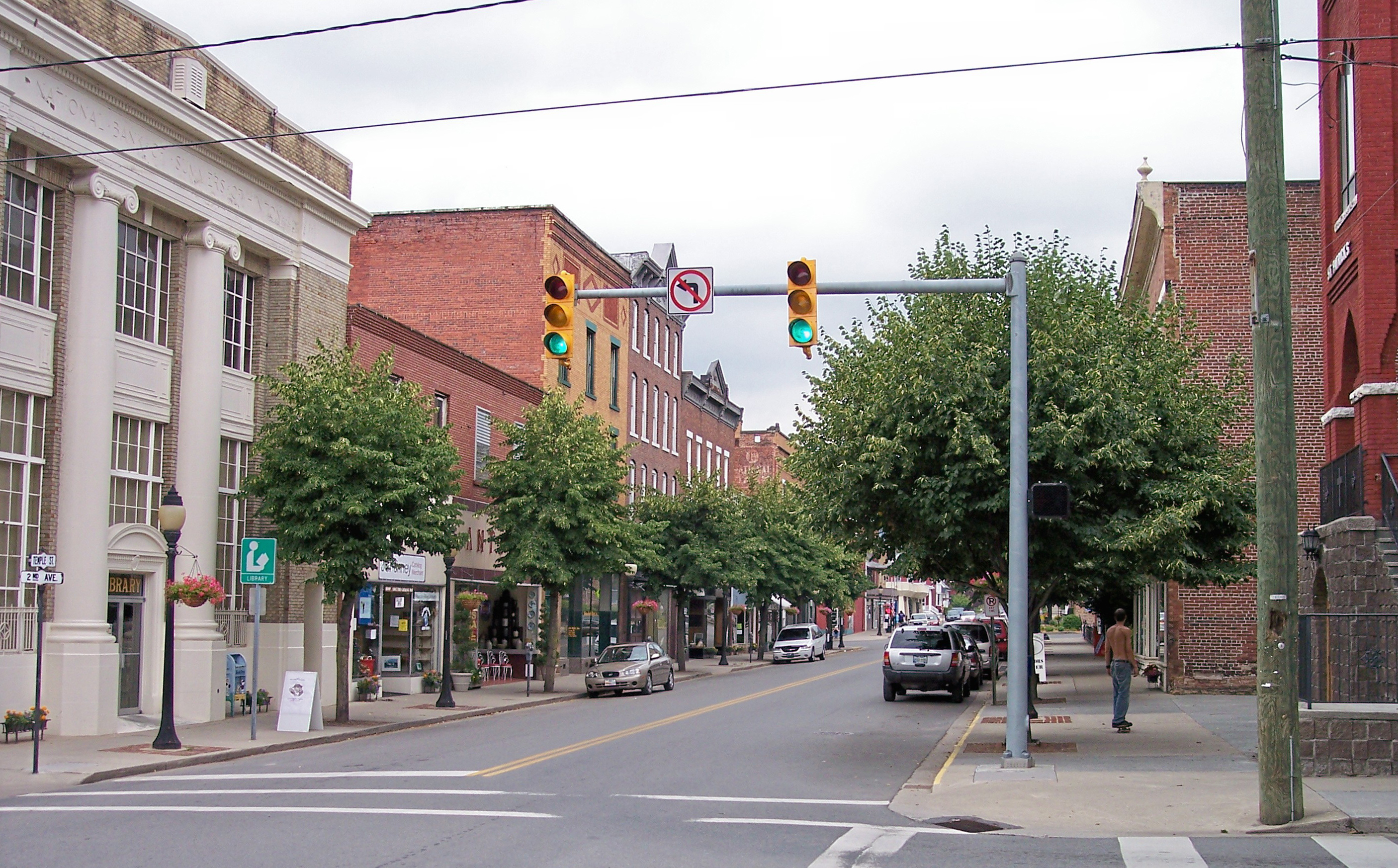
- Temple Street in the historic district in 2007

- Location within West Virginia Location within the United States
- Location: Roughly bounded by C & O RR, James St., 5th Ave., and Roundhouse; Hill St. Hinton, West Virginia
- Coordinates: 37°40′25″N 80°53′11″W
- Area: 80 acres (32 ha)
- Built: 1837
- Architect: Bates, Richard M.; et al.
- Architectural style: Classical Revival, Late Victorian, American Four-Square
- NRHP reference No.: 84003670, 05000661
- Added to NRHP: February 17, 1984, July 6, 2005

The Hinton Historic District is a national historic district located at Hinton, Summers County, West Virginia. The original Hinton Historic District is bordered roughly by the Chesapeake and Ohio Railway line, James Street, 5th Avenue, and Roundhouse. The boundary increase extended the district to include Mill Street. It was listed on the National Register of Historic Places in 1984 and revised in 2005.

It encompasses 212 contributing buildings, one contributing structure (a railroad water tank), and two contributing objects (veterans' memorials). They include the business and commercial core of Hinton and surrounding residential areas. The buildings are largely two and three story with first floor commercial activities with offices and apartments above. Many of the buildings feature stone trim and some have cast iron store fronts. Residential buildings are representative of popular late 19th- and early 20th-century architectural styles.

Notable buildings include the Wagon Wheel Restaurant (1876), Summers County Library, R.R. Flanagan Building (c. 1906), Lowe Furniture Company Building (c. 1905), former National Bank of Summers building, O. Ike Keaton residence (c. 1905), Bluestone Tire Company building (C. 1919), C&O Railway Passenger Station, Y.M.C.A. (c. 1911), First Baptist Church (1913), Hotel McCreery (c. 1907), Ewart-Miller Building (c. 1905), McCreery / Palmer residence, Carnegie Library, Summers County Jail (1870s), and U.S. Post Office (1926, expanded 1960s). Located in the district is the separately listed Summers County Courthouse.

== Gallery ==
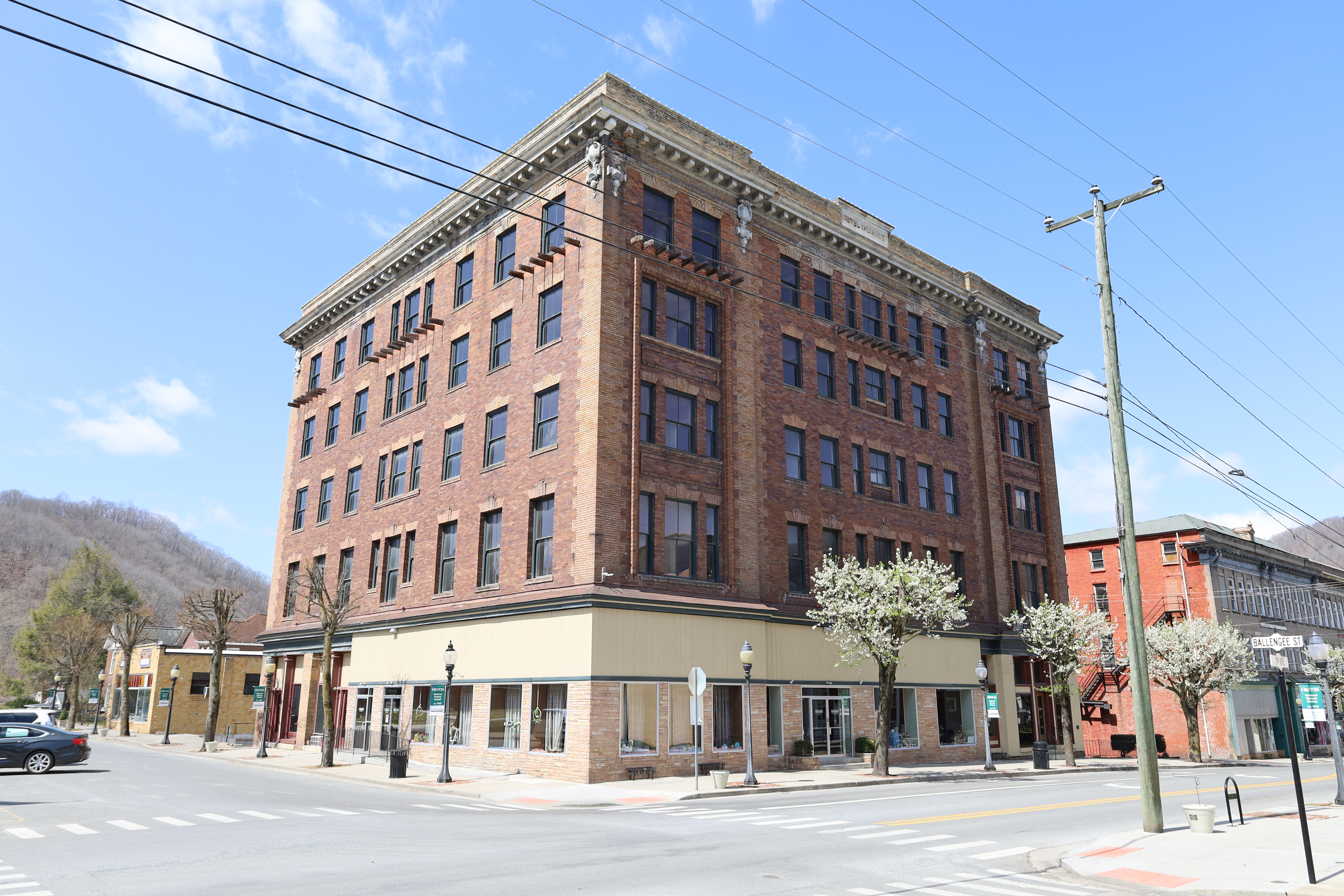
Hotel McCreery

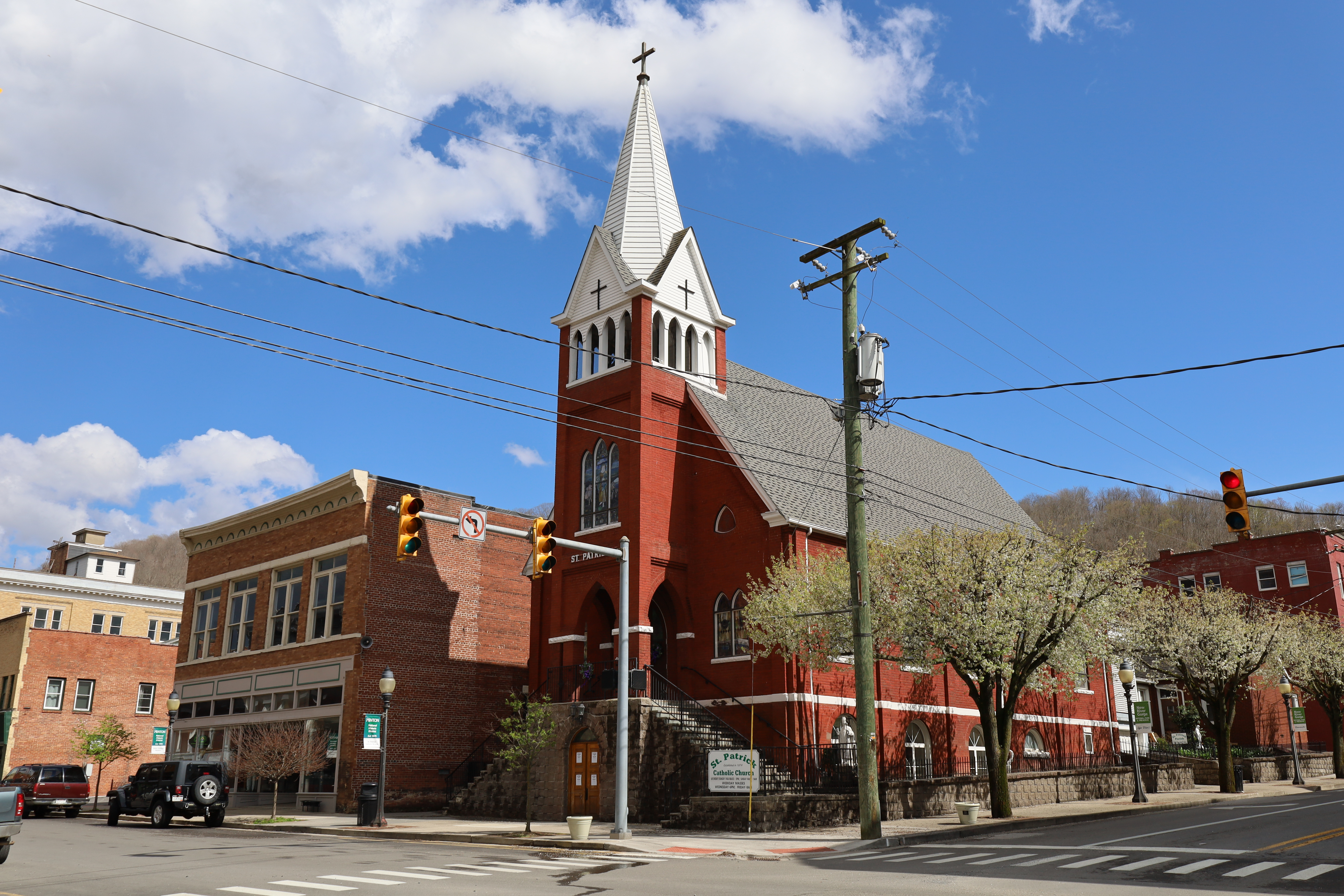
Hinton Railroad Museum and St. Patrick Church on Temple Street

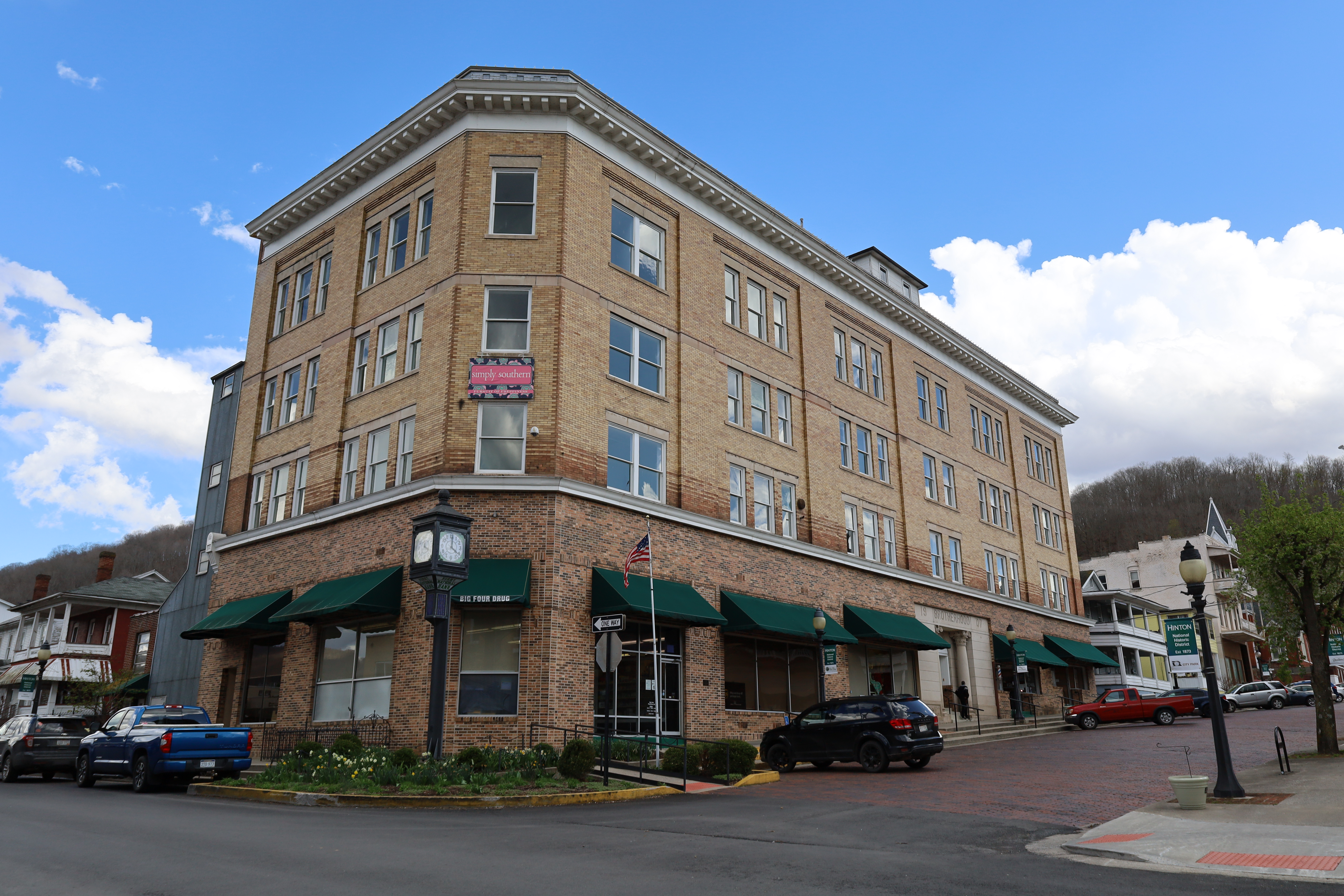
Big Four Building

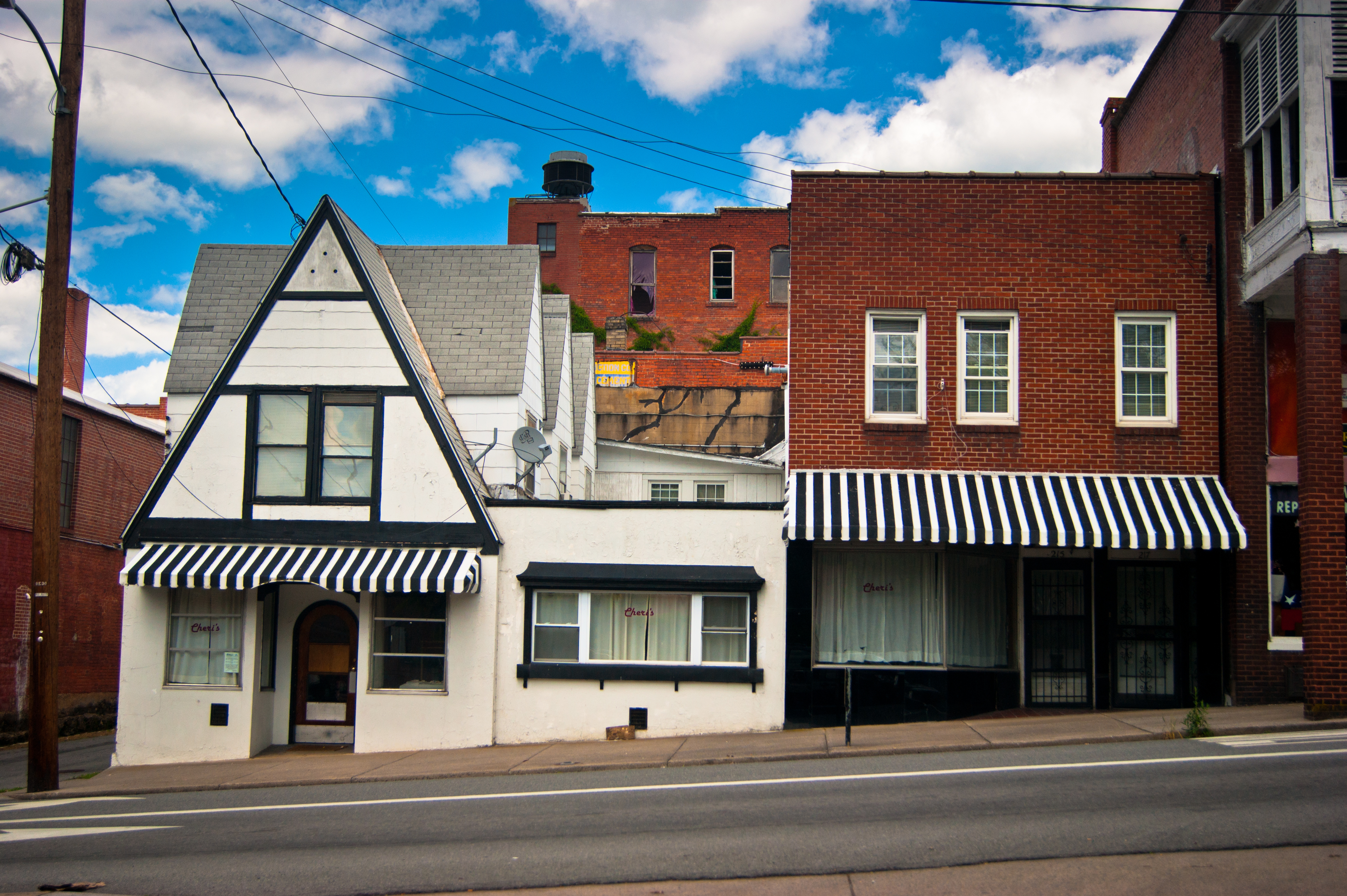
213 Second Avenue was built in the 1930s in the Arts and Crafts style and long served as a diner. It currently houses Lucky Rivers Cafe and Catering.

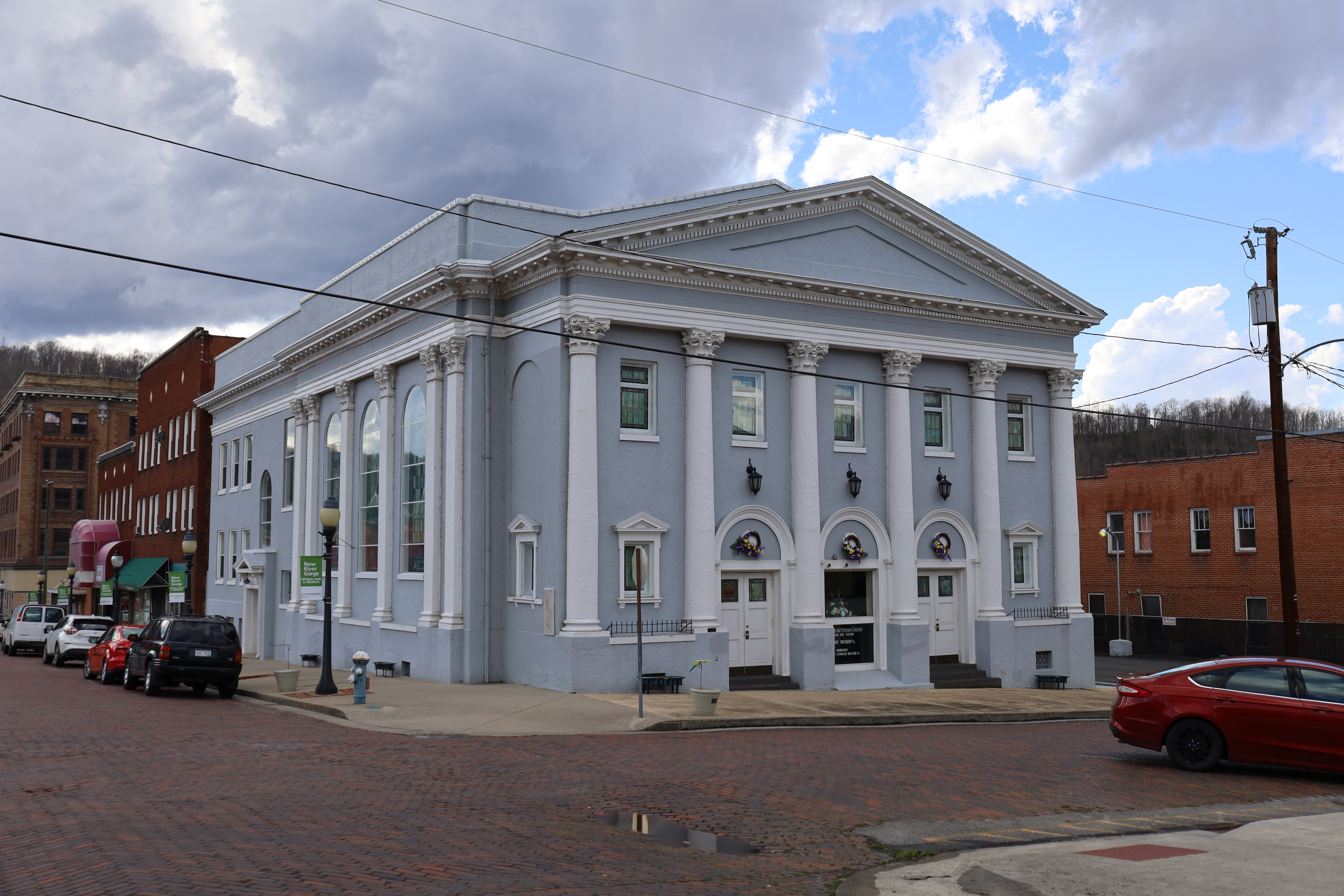
First Presbyterian Church

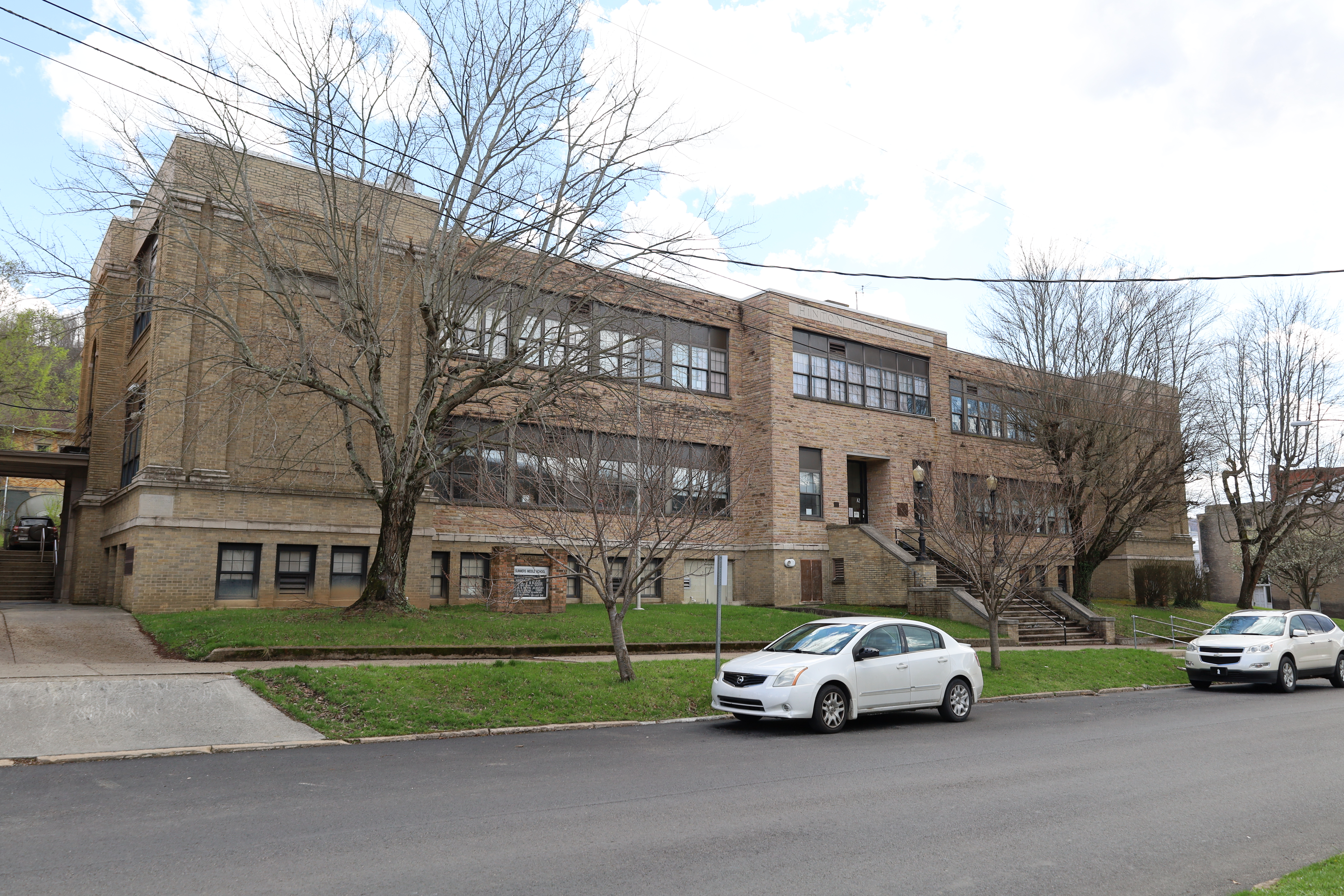
Hinton High School (now a middle school)

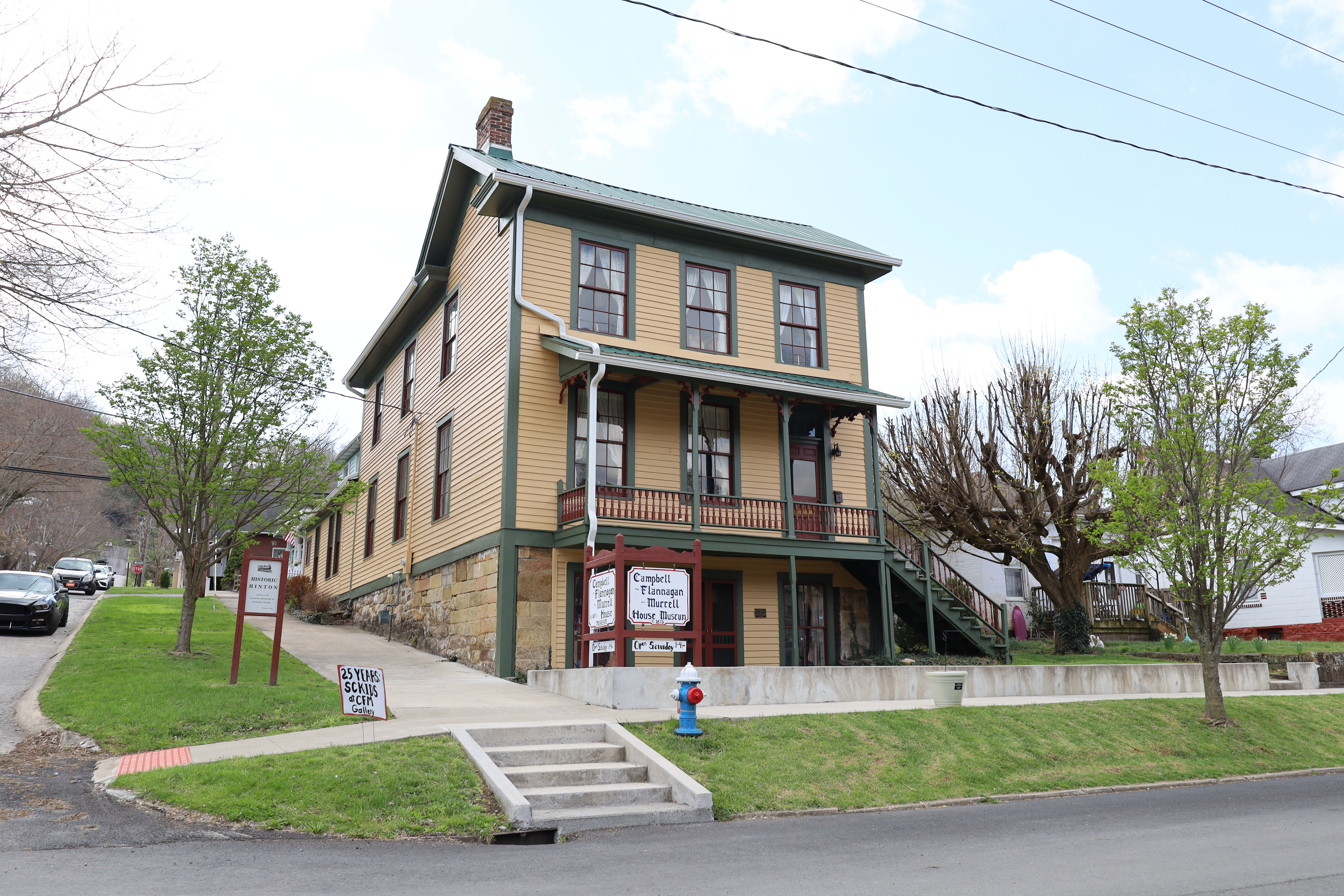
Campbell-Flannagan-Murrell House Museum

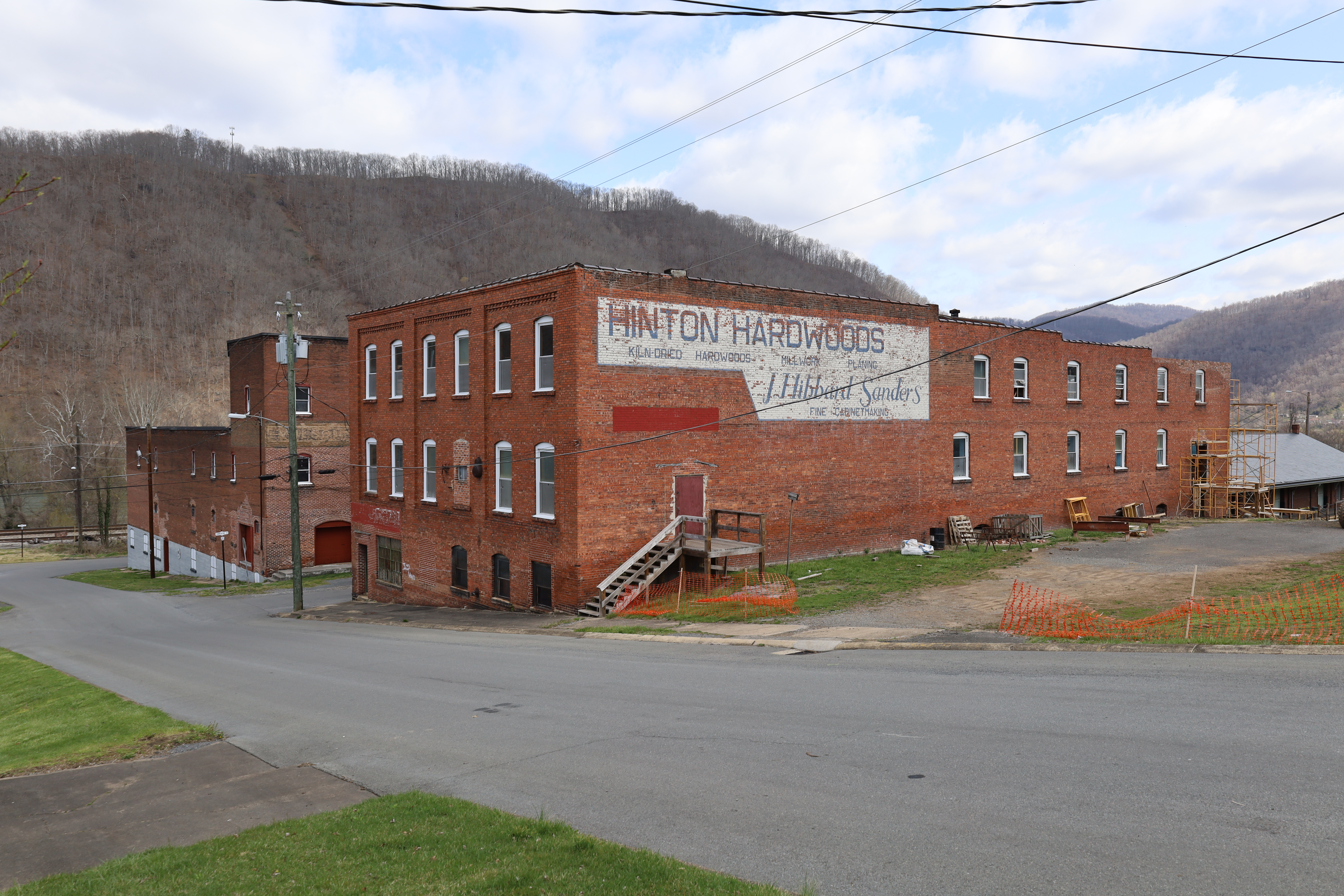
Industrial buildings in the district

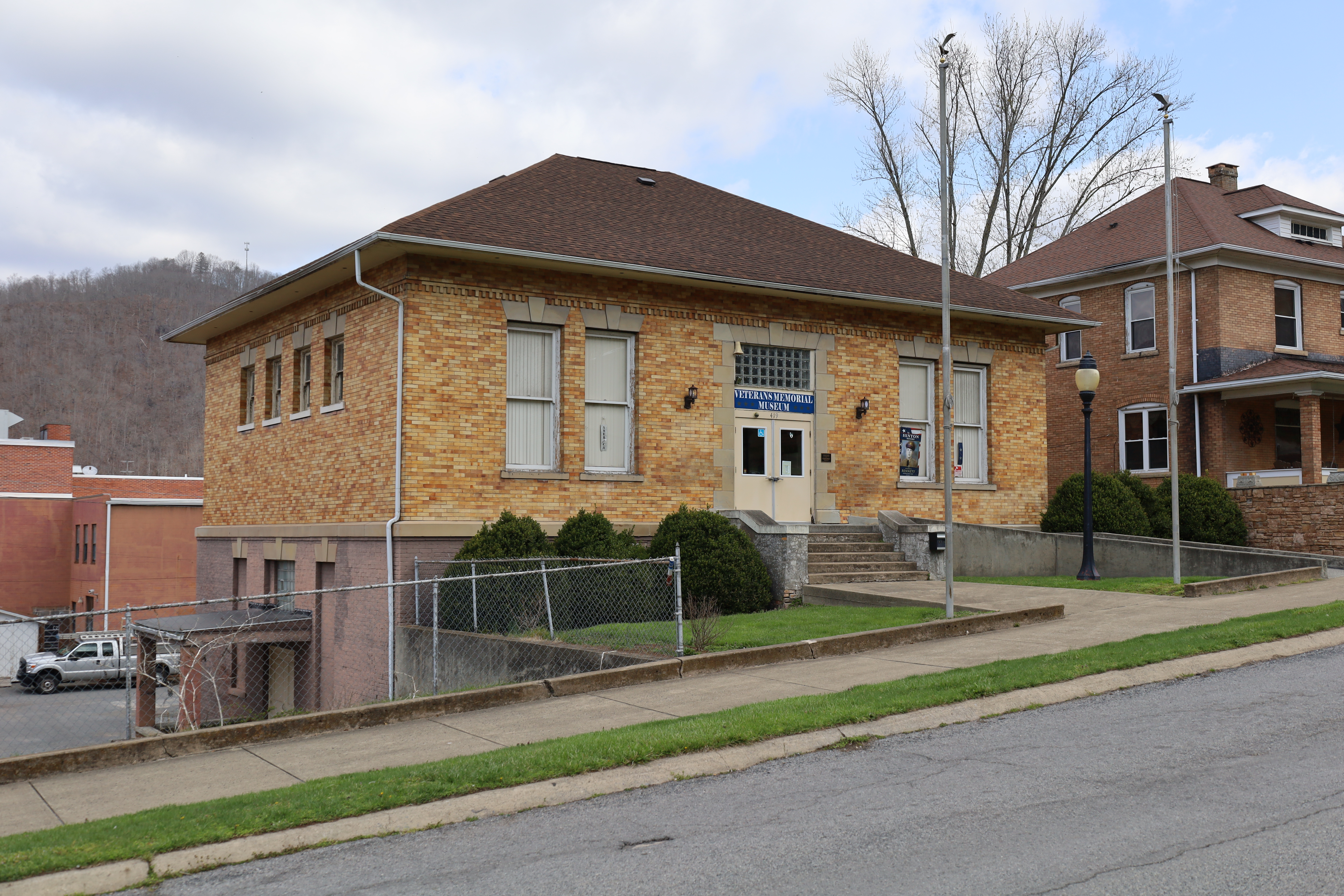
Carnegie Library, now a veterans museum

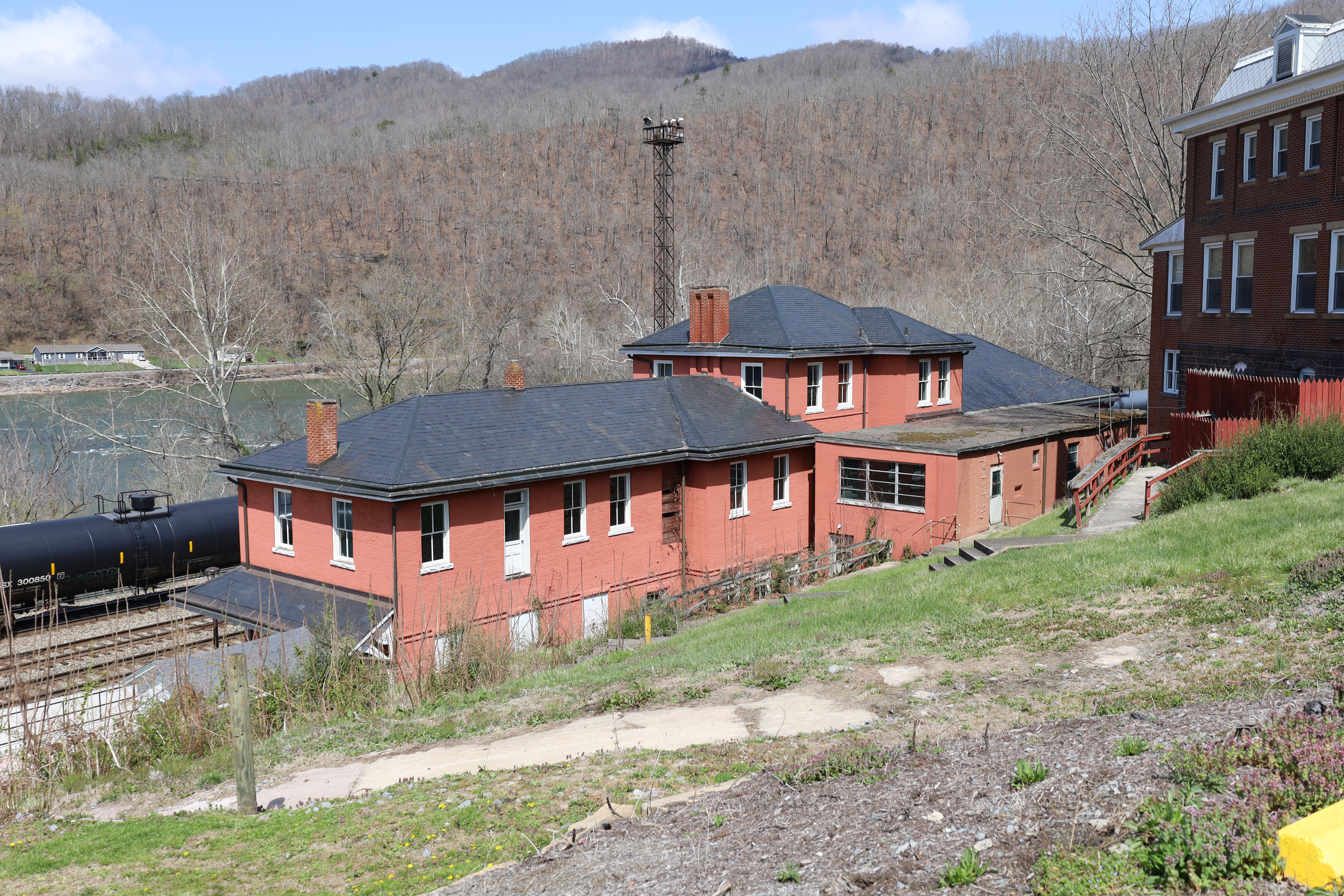
Rear of Hinton station
