= White Sulphur Springs station =

Amtrak stop in West Virginia

White Sulphur Springs, WV
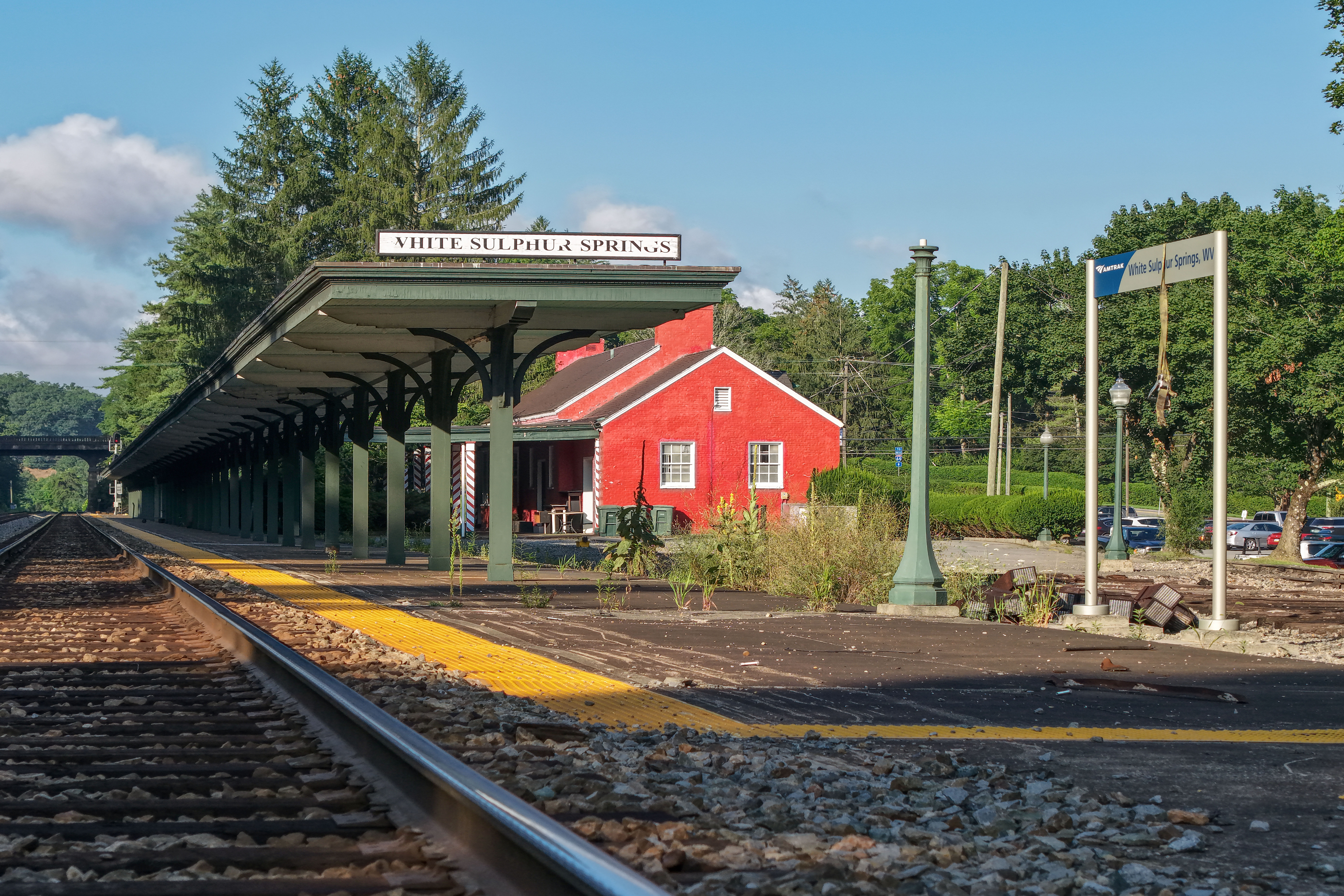
- The station in 2026

General information
- Location: 315 West Main Street; White Sulphur Springs, West Virginia; United States
- Coordinates: 37°47′7″N 80°18′20″W
- Line: CSX Alleghany Subdivision
- Platforms: 1 side platform
- Tracks: 2

Construction
- Parking: Yes

Other information
- Station code: Amtrak: WSS

History
- Rebuilt: 1930–1931

Passengers
- FY 2025: 6,508 (Amtrak)

Services
| Preceding station | Amtrak | Following station |
|---|---|---|
| Alderson toward Chicago | Cardinal | Clifton Forge toward New York |
Former services
| Preceding station | Amtrak | Following station |
|---|---|---|
| Hinton toward Chicago | James Whitcomb Riley 1974–1977 | Clifton Forge toward Washington, D.C. |
| Hinton toward Chicago | James Whitcomb Riley and George Washington 1971–1974 | Clifton Forge toward Washington, D.C. or Newport News |
| Preceding station | Chesapeake and Ohio Railway | Following station |
| Ronceverte toward Cincinnati | Main Line | Alleghany toward Washington, D.C. or Phoebus |
Location

White Sulphur Springs station is a railway station in White Sulphur Springs, West Virginia, served by Amtrak, the national passenger railway. The station is a stop on Amtrak's Cardinal route.

== History ==
In the early 1900s, a wooden frame passenger station was built by the Chesapeake and Ohio Railway (C&O).

A brick station was built in 1930 or 1931 by C&O to serve passengers on the new Pullman rail coaches to The Greenbrier resort hotel. It is directly across from the entrance to The Greenbrier grounds.

The original cottages, which eventually expanded into a resort property known as the Old White Hotel, were purchased by C&O in 1910. The hotel was renovated and reopened in 1913 as the Greenbrier. The hotel became a showcase for the railroad company. It was promoted in C&O's timetables and literature. Tracks behind the station were used for parking business-owned and private cars of the wealthy patrons that came to the hotel. The hotel stayed in the hands of C&O and its successors, Chessie System and CSX, until 2009.

The historic Colonial Revival style depot building now serves as the hotel's year-round Christmas gift shop. Originally painted all white, the station now has a bright holiday red-and-white "candy cane" paint job making it unique among other Amtrak stations.

Since the late 1980s/early 1990s, Amtrak passengers have used the adjacent covered platform. This is an unstaffed station with no amenities or station services: rest room, ticketing, checked baggage, etc. Overnight parking at the station is available, but there is no Amtrak ticketing kiosk; all tickets must be purchased in advance. Complimentary transportation is provided between the train station and The Greenbrier resort.

== See also ==
- Greenbrier Presidential Express

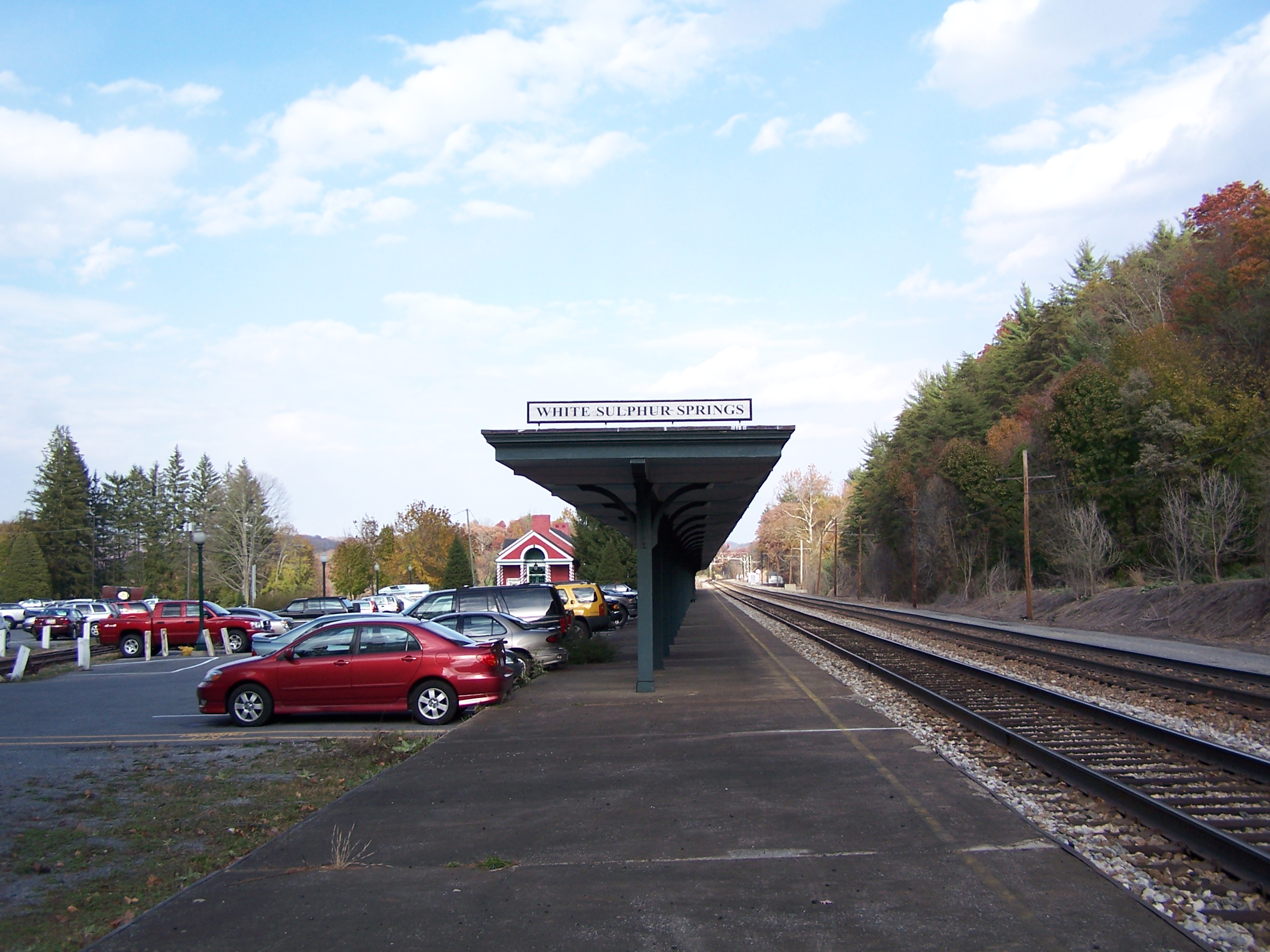
Looking east at the loading platform
