= Clifton Forge station =

Railway station in Clifton Forge, Virginia, United States

Clifton Forge, VA
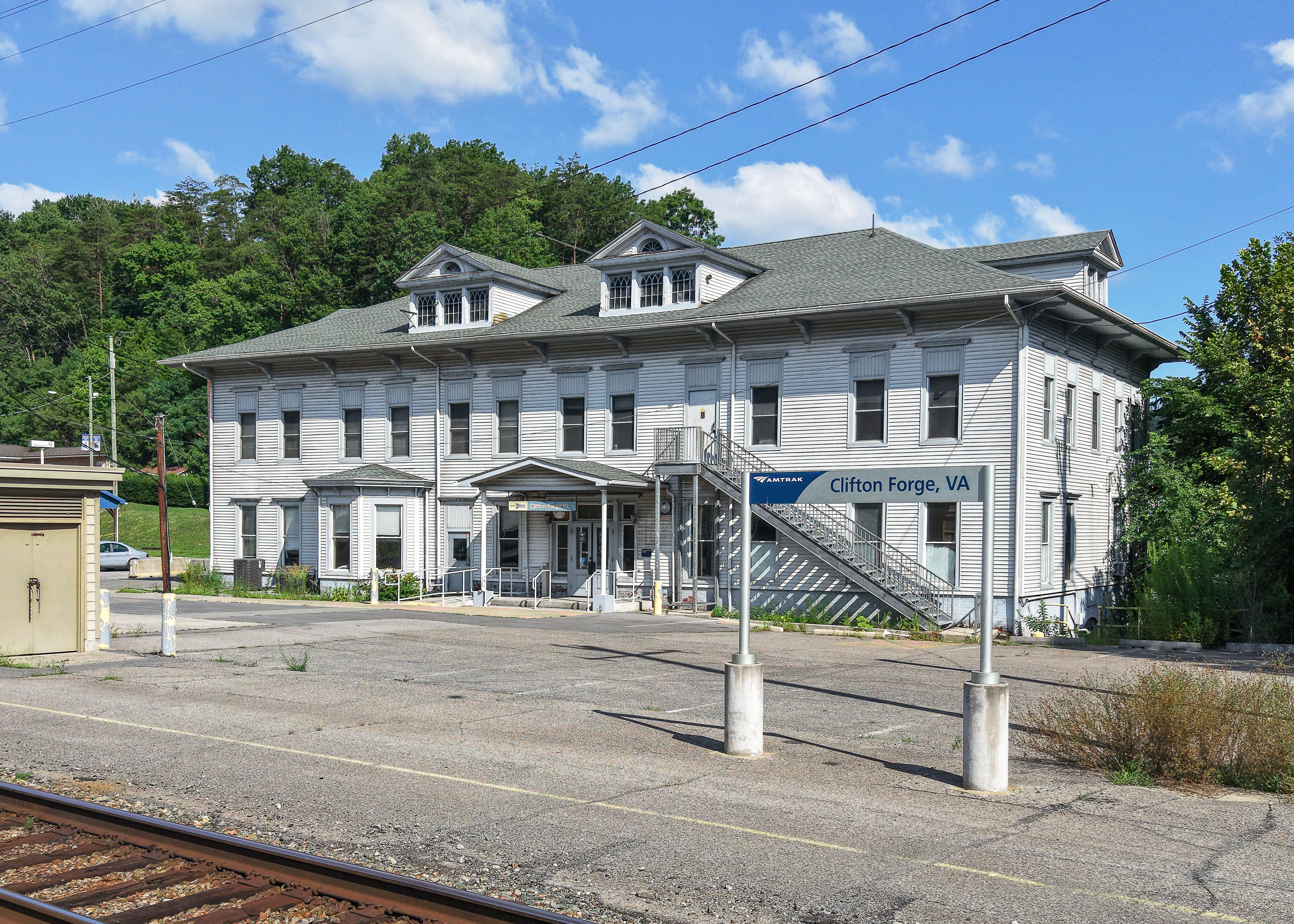
- Clifton Forge station building in 2026

General information
- Location: 307 East Ridgeway Street; Clifton Forge, Virginia; United States
- Coordinates: 37.8146°N 79.8274°W
- Owner: CSX Transportation
- Line: CSX Alleghany Subdivision
- Platforms: 1 side platform
- Tracks: 2

Construction
- Parking: Yes
- Accessible: Platform only

Other information
- Station code: Amtrak: CLF

History
- Opened: 1857
- Rebuilt: 1891; 1897; 1906

Passengers
- FY 2025: 2,178 (Amtrak)

Services
Preceding station	Amtrak	Following station
White Sulphur Springs toward Chicago	Cardinal	Staunton toward New York
Former services
Preceding station	Amtrak	Following station
White Sulphur Springs toward Chicago	James Whitcomb Riley 1974-1977	Staunton toward Washington, D.C. or Newport News
White Sulphur Springs toward Chicago	James Whitcomb Riley and George Washington 1971-1974	Staunton toward Washington, D.C. or Newport News
Preceding station	Chesapeake and Ohio Railway	Following station
Low Moor toward Cincinnati	Main Line	Longdale toward Washington, D.C. or Phoebus
Terminus	Richmond and Alleghany Railroad	Iron Gate toward Richmond
Location

Clifton Forge station is a train station in Clifton Forge, Virginia, serving Amtrak's Cardinal line. It is located at 307 East Ridgeway Street.

== History ==
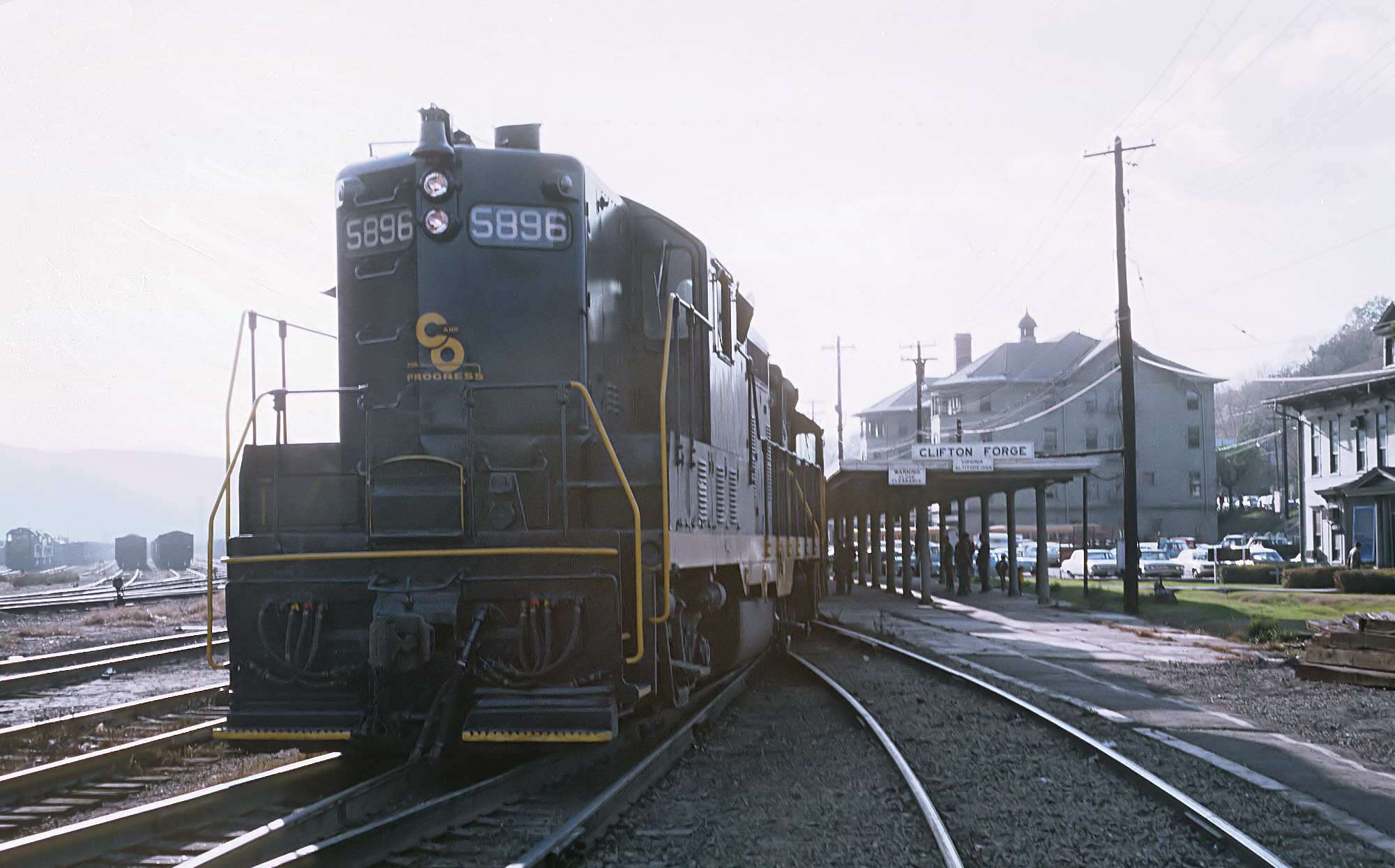
A fantrip calling at Clifton Forge in 1969. The platform canopy is no longer standing.

The Virginia Central Railroad extended to Clifton Forge in 1857, a point originally called Jackson River. The railroad's first station building on the site was constructed in 1891. Passenger operations moved to the nearby Gladys Inn in 1897.

The modern two-story station building is a clapboard structure originally built by the Chesapeake and Ohio Railway (C&O) in 1906 as the railway's local offices. It became the passenger station in 1930 when the Gladys Inn was converted into the local YMCA building. It sits just east of a major locomotive fuel facility for CSX Transportation.

== Plans ==
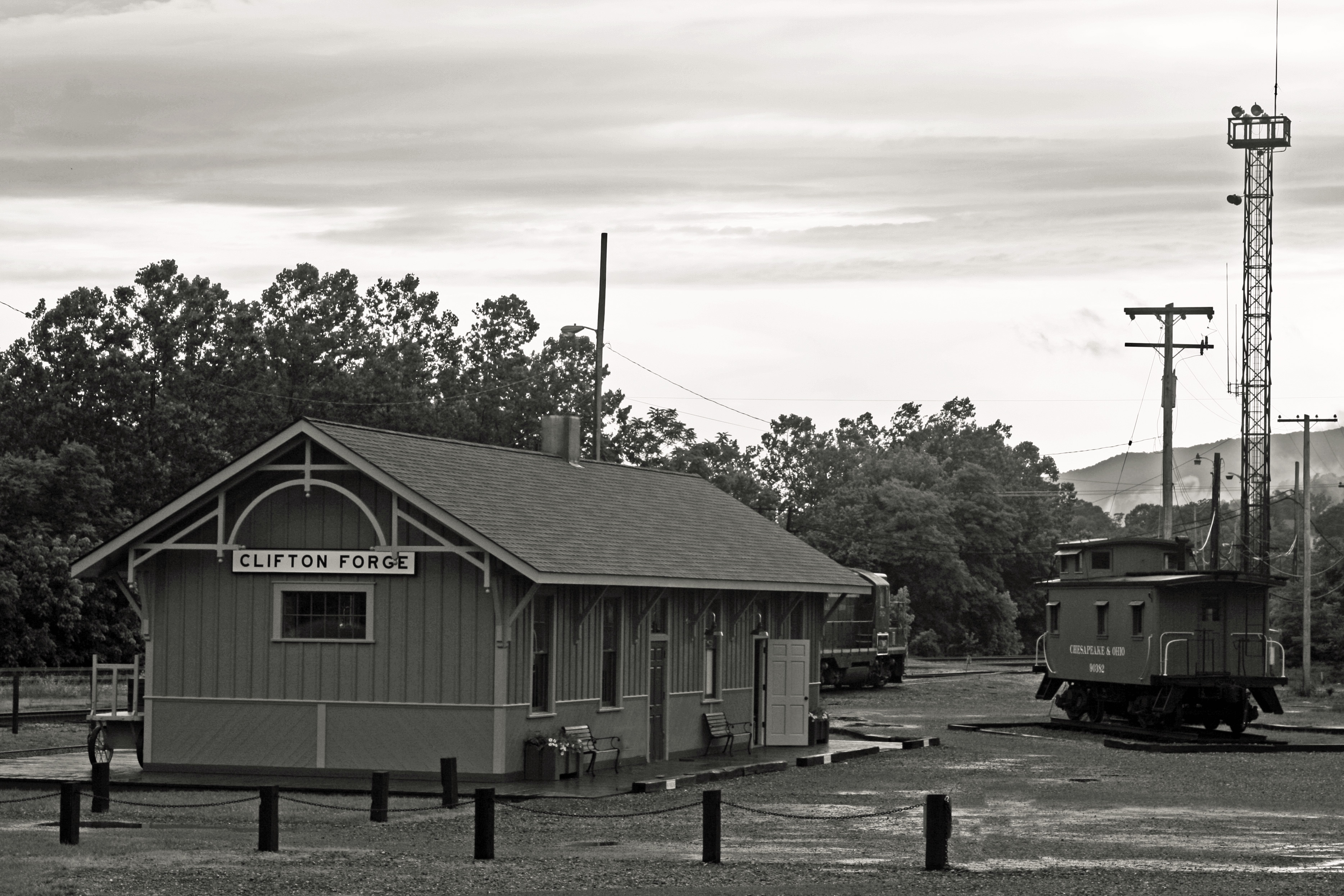
The proposed new station, 705 Main Street

In 2013, Amtrak announced that it planned to move the stop to a new station built by the Chesapeake and Ohio Historical Society. The building is a replica of the original 1891 station, and it is located on Main Street, east of the current facility.
