= Alderson station =

Train station in West Virginia, US

Alderson, WV
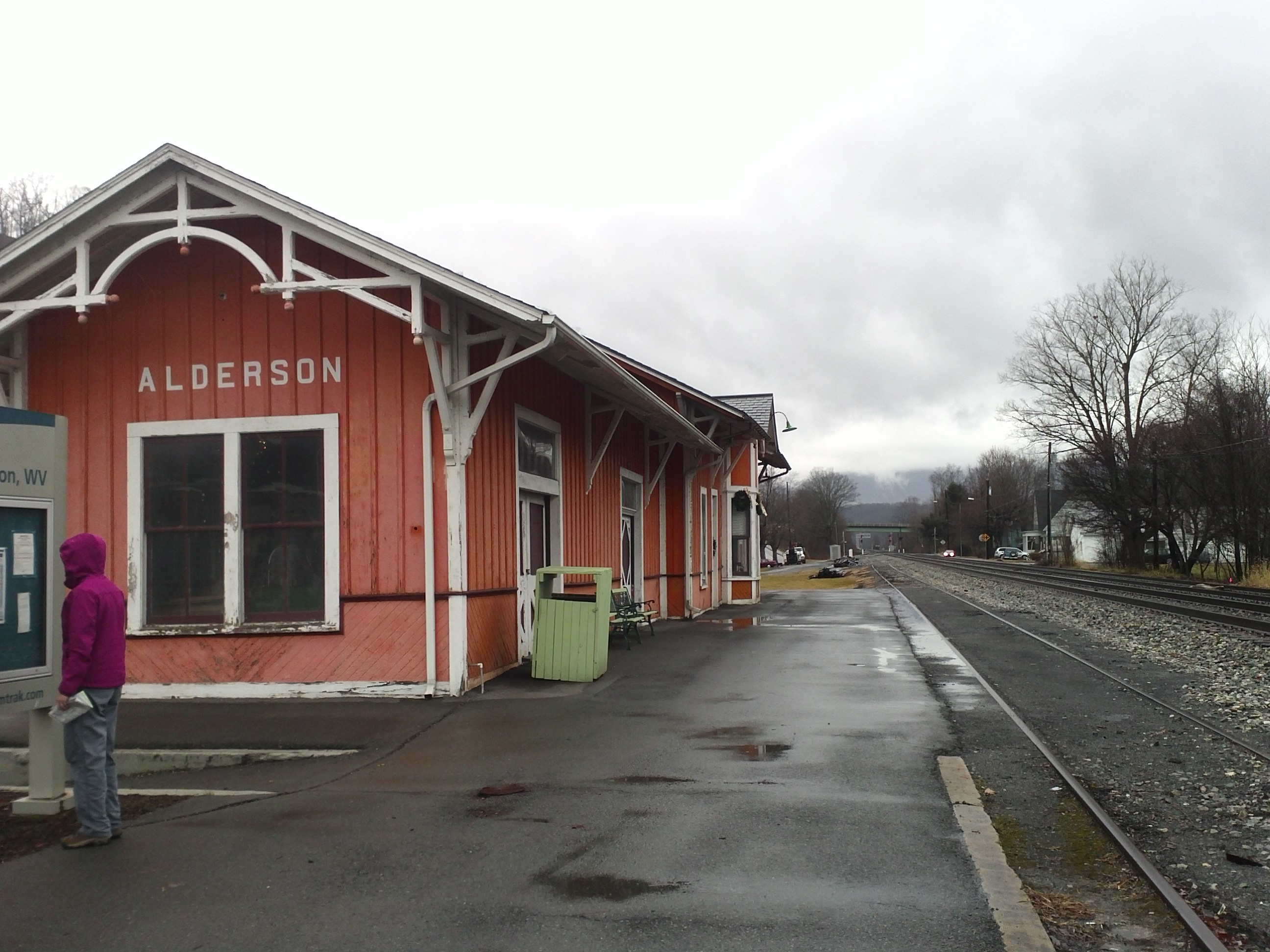
- Trackside view of the depot.

General information
- Location: 1 C&O Plaza; Alderson, West Virginia; United States
- Coordinates: 37°43′27″N 80°38′40″W
- Line: CSX Alleghany Subdivision
- Platforms: 1 side platform
- Tracks: 2

Other information
- Station code: Amtrak: ALD

History
- Opened: 1896, 2004
- Closed: 2001

Passengers
- FY 2025: 466 (Amtrak)

Services
Preceding station	Amtrak	Following station
Hinton toward Chicago	Cardinal	White Sulphur Springs toward New York
Former services
Preceding station	Chesapeake and Ohio Railway	Following station
Hinton toward Cincinnati	Main Line	Ronceverte toward Washington, D.C. or Phoebus
Location

Alderson station is an Amtrak station in Alderson, West Virginia, served by the Cardinal. It is located at 1 C&O Plaza, and functions as a request stop. The station is a contributing property within the Alderson Historic District, which has been listed on the National Register of Historic Places since November 12, 1993.

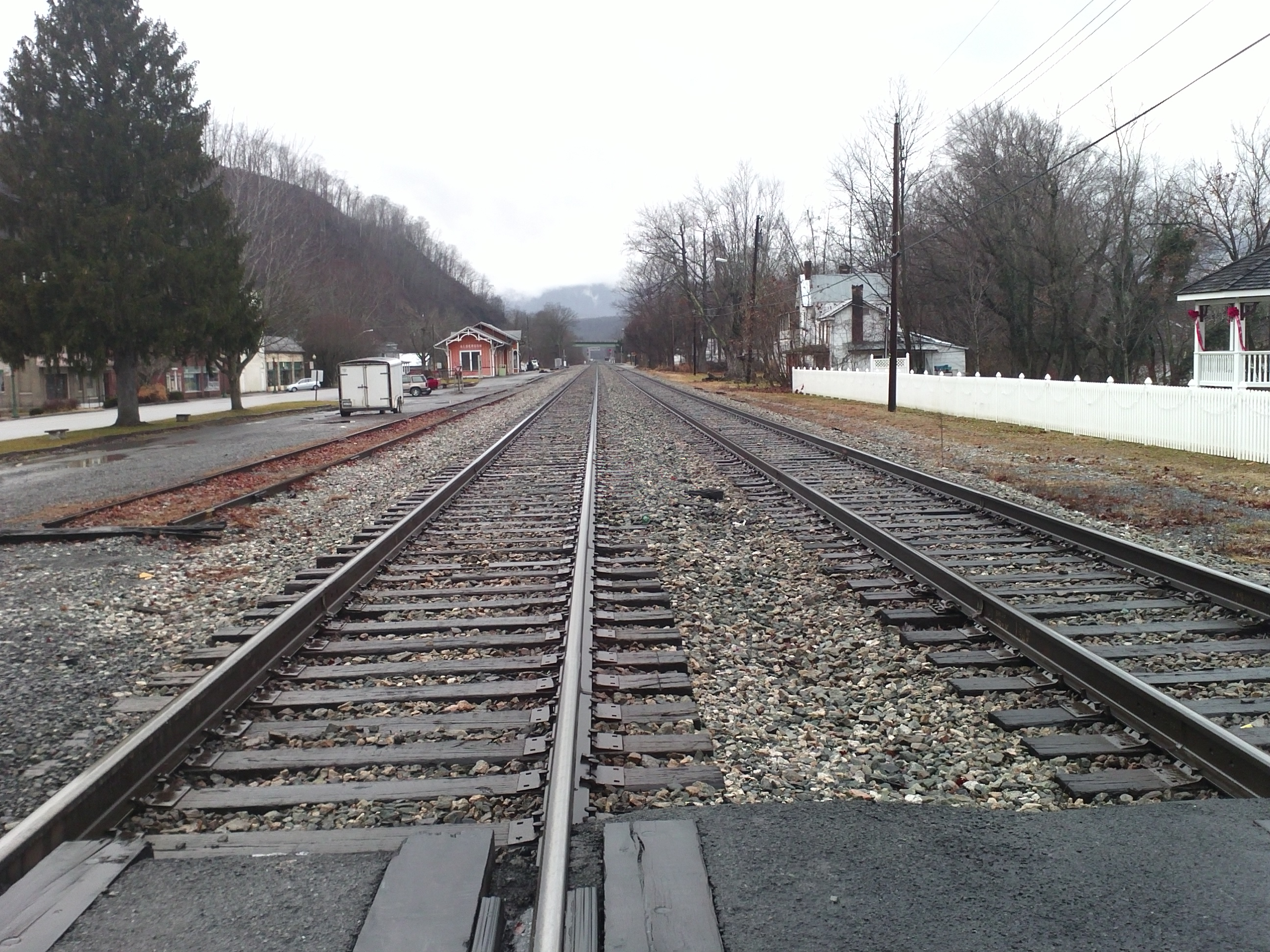
A view of Alderson, WV depot and a portion of the tracks from the crossing to the historic 1914 Memorial Bridge

The wood frame depot, originally built by the Chesapeake and Ohio Railway in 1896, is typical of a standard station built on the C&O system between 1890 and 1914. It features board and batten walls, decorative brackets, fancy stick work on the gable ends and deep eaves. The railroad enlarged the structure in 1924.

Amtrak began serving the community on April 29, 1979. Between December 4, 2001, and the second half of 2004, service to the station was suspended, partially due to the work for a repainting that changed the station from white to orange. It was Amtrak's least used station in West Virginia in FY2022.
