= Hinton station (West Virginia) =

Amtrak station in Hinton, West Virginia

Hinton, WV
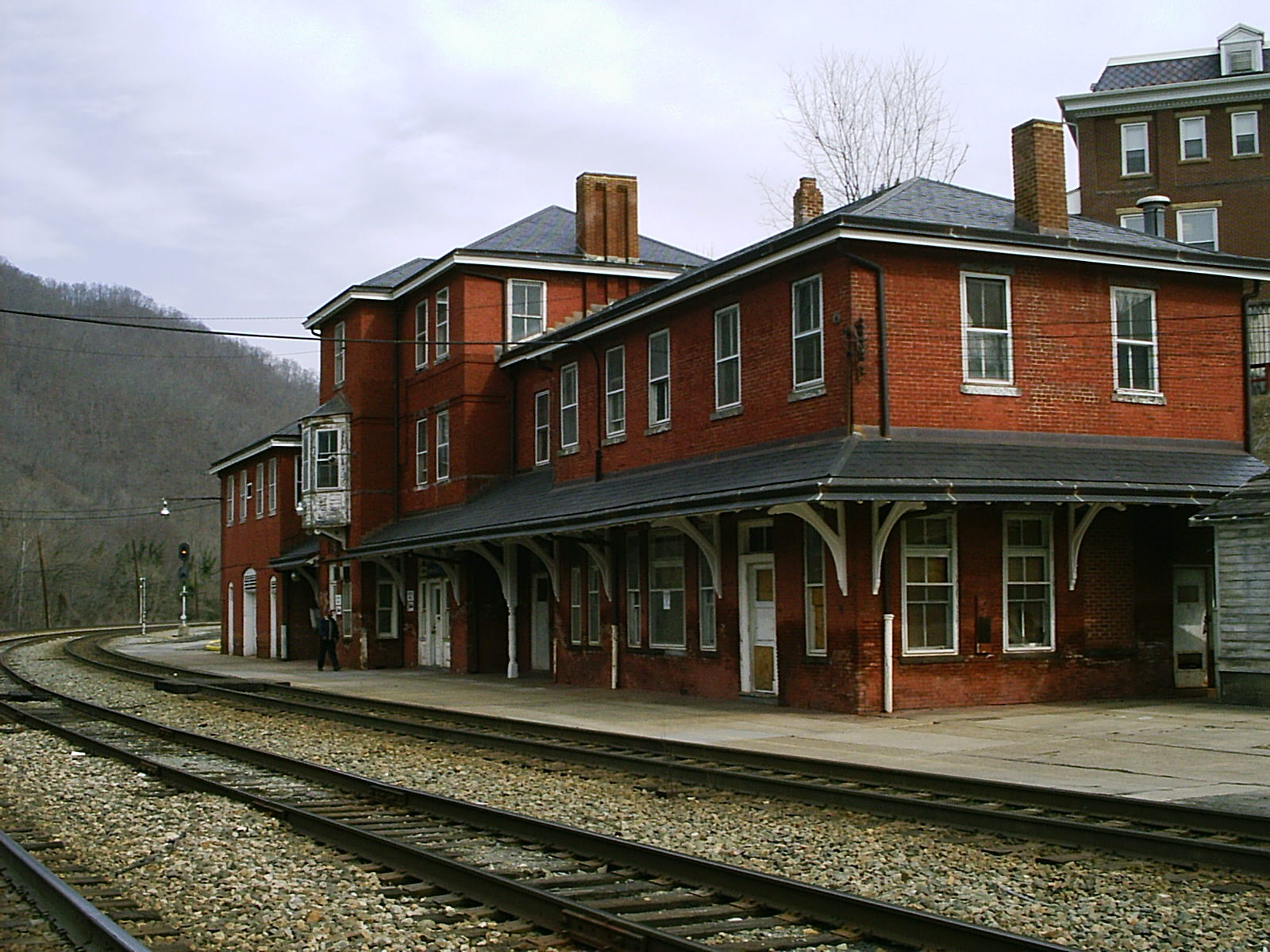
- Hinton station in December 2003

General information
- Location: 100 Second Avenue; Hinton, West Virginia; United States
- Coordinates: 37°40′29″N 80°53′32″W
- Line: CSX New River Subdivision
- Platforms: 1 side platform
- Tracks: 3

Other information
- Station code: Amtrak: HIN

History
- Opened: September 25, 1872
- Rebuilt: 1892

Passengers
- FY 2025: 2,514 (Amtrak)

Services
Preceding station	Amtrak	Following station
Prince toward Chicago	Cardinal	Alderson toward New York
Former services
Preceding station	Amtrak	Following station
Prince toward Chicago	James Whitcomb Riley 1974–1977	White Sulphur Springs toward Washington, D.C.
Prince toward Chicago	James Whitcomb Riley and George Washington 1971–1974	White Sulphur Springs toward Washington, D.C. or Newport News
Preceding station	Chesapeake and Ohio Railway	Following station
Meadow Creek toward Cincinnati	Main Line	Alderson toward Washington, D.C. or Phoebus
Location

Hinton station is an Amtrak station in Hinton, West Virginia, served by the Cardinal. The station is a former Chesapeake and Ohio Railway depot, and is located in the Hinton Historic District. Constructed in 1892, the brick building includes wood canopies supported by heavy brackets featuring a wood-fan pattern trim.

A December 2007, fire damaged the building, but it reopened a short time later following repairs. The depot is currently undergoing a $1.5-million series of phased repairs and renovations. Work in the early phases included installation of a new slate roof, re-pointing of the brickwork and repairs to the windows and decorative woodwork. A new concrete platform with tactile edging was also installed.

Due to a bend in the adjacent New River, eastbound trains actually head southwest when passing the station (and vice versa).
