= Cardinal (train) =

Amtrak service from Chicago, IL to New York, NY

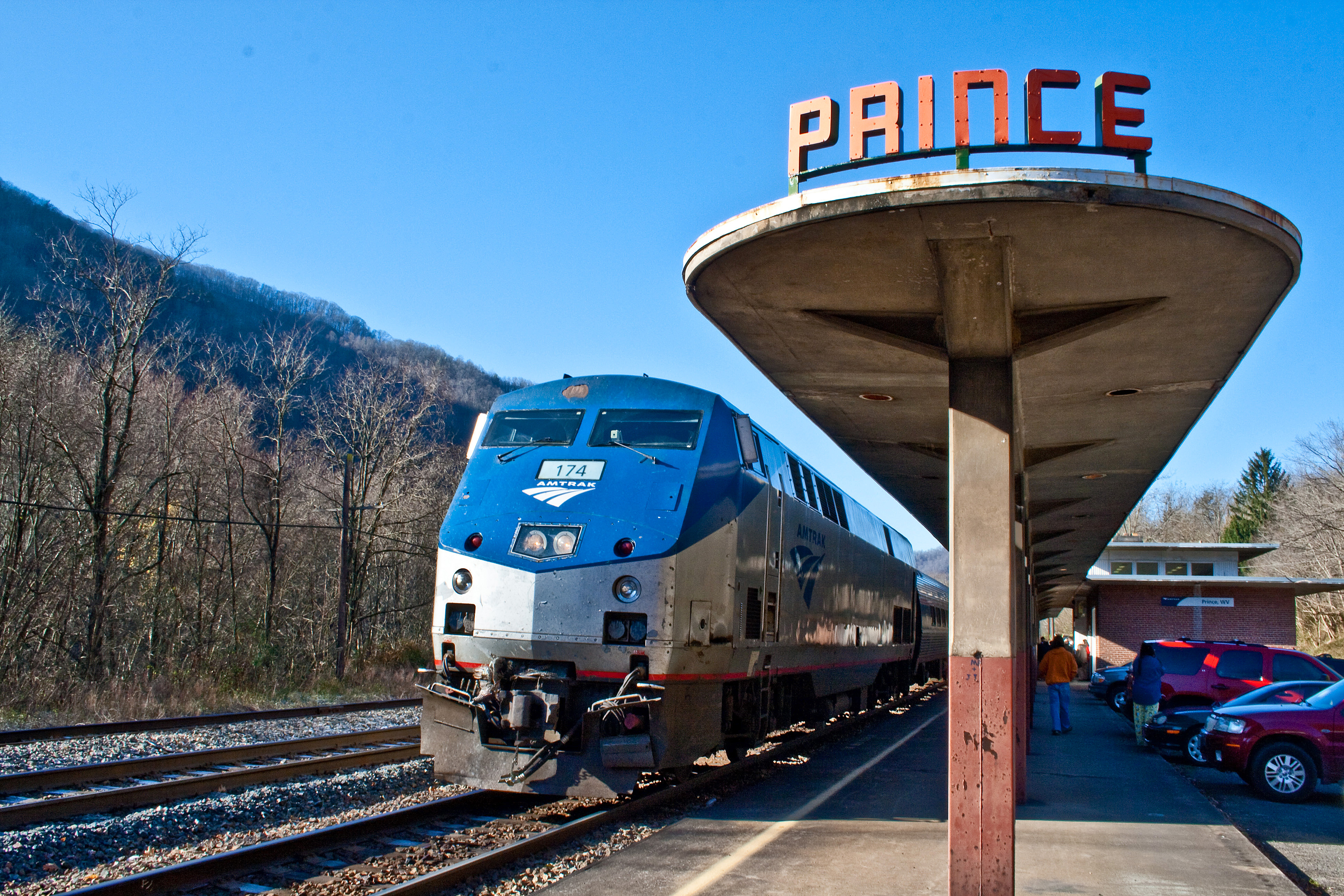
- The eastbound Cardinal in Prince, West Virginia in 2009

Overview
- Service type: Inter-city rail Higher-speed rail (Northeast Corridor only)
- Locale: Mid-Atlantic, Midwestern and Southeastern United States
- Predecessor: James Whitcomb Riley
- First service: October 30, 1977
- Current operator: Amtrak
- Annual ridership: 98,583 (FY 25) ▲6% (Note: Amtrak's Fiscal Year (FY) runs from October 1 of the prior year to September 30 of the named year.)

Route
- Termini: Chicago, Illinois; New York
- Stops: 36
- Distance travelled: 1,146 miles (1,844 km)
- Average journey time: 27 hours, 45 minutes
- Service frequency: Three round trips per week
- Train number: 50/51

On-board services
- Classes: Coach Class; First Class Sleeper Service
- Disabled access: All train cars, most stations
- Sleeping arrangements: Roomette (2 beds); Bedroom (2 beds); Bedroom Suite (4 beds); Accessible Bedroom (2 beds)
- Catering facilities: Café/Dinette (combined car)
- Baggage facilities: Overhead racks, checked baggage available at selected stations

Technical
- Rolling stock: Amfleet · Viewliner
- Track gauge: 4 ft 8 1/2 in (1,435 mm) standard gauge
- Operating speed: 41 mph (66 km/h) (avg.); 125 mph (201 km/h) (top)
- Track owners: AMTK, BB, CN, CSX, METX, NS, UP

The Cardinal is a long-distance passenger train operated by Amtrak between New York Penn Station and Chicago Union Station via Philadelphia, Washington, D.C., Charlottesville, Charleston, Huntington, Cincinnati, and Indianapolis. Along with the Floridian and Lake Shore Limited, it is one of three trains linking the Northeast and Chicago. The 1,146-mile (1,844 km) trip between New York and Chicago is scheduled for 28 1/4 hours.

The Cardinal has three round trips each week, departing New York City on Sundays, Wednesdays, and Fridays, and departing Chicago on Tuesdays, Thursdays, and Saturdays. Prior to being discontinued in 2019, the Hoosier State provided service on the portion of the Cardinal's route between Indianapolis and Chicago on the other four days of the week.

The Cardinal's ridership was 82,705 in fiscal year 2023, a 3.0% increase from FY2022, but approximately 25% below its pre-COVID-19 pandemic ridership of about 109,000 in FY2019. In the two fiscal years prior to the pandemic (FY2018 and FY2019), ridership had increased 12.5%. In FY2020, the Cardinal earned $7.1 million on expenses of $22.6M—a revenue-to-cost ratio of 31%, the second lowest among all Amtrak routes.

== History ==
The Cardinal is the successor of several previous trains, primarily the New York Central (later Penn Central) James Whitcomb Riley and the Chesapeake and Ohio Railway (C&O) George Washington. The James Whitcomb Riley was a daytime all-coach train which operated between Chicago and Cincinnati (via Indianapolis). The George Washington, the C&O's flagship train, was a long-distance sleeper that ran between Cincinnati and—via a split in Charlottesville, Virginia—Washington, D.C. and Newport News, Virginia. Until the late 1950s, the Riley carried the Washington's sleeper cars between Cincinnati and Chicago. Both routes survived until the formation of Amtrak in 1971.

Amtrak kept service mostly identical through the spring and summer of 1971. It slowly began integrating the trains that summer. The two trains began exchanging through Washington—Chicago and Newport News—Chicago coaches at Cincinnati on July 12, and a through sleeping car began September 8. On November 14, the Riley and George Washington merged into a single long-distance Chicago-Washington train, with the eastbound train (train 50) known as the George Washington and the westbound train (train 51) known as the Riley. The eastern terminus was briefly extended to Boston, giving the Northeast Corridor a one-seat ride to Chicago. However, it was truncated back to Washington in 1972. On May 19, 1974, Amtrak fully merged the George Washington into the Riley.

During the early Amtrak era, the Riley was plagued by the poor condition of ex-New York Central track in Indiana. In 1973, it was moved to ex-Pennsylvania Railroad track through Indianapolis. By 1974, Amtrak rerouted it off Penn Central track altogether; by then, the trackage had deteriorated so badly that the Riley was limited to 10 mph (16 km/h) for much of its route through Indiana. The Newport News section ended in 1976, replaced by the Boston–Newport News Colonial. A number of long-distance trains running along former Penn Central trackage in the Midwest were plagued by similar problems.

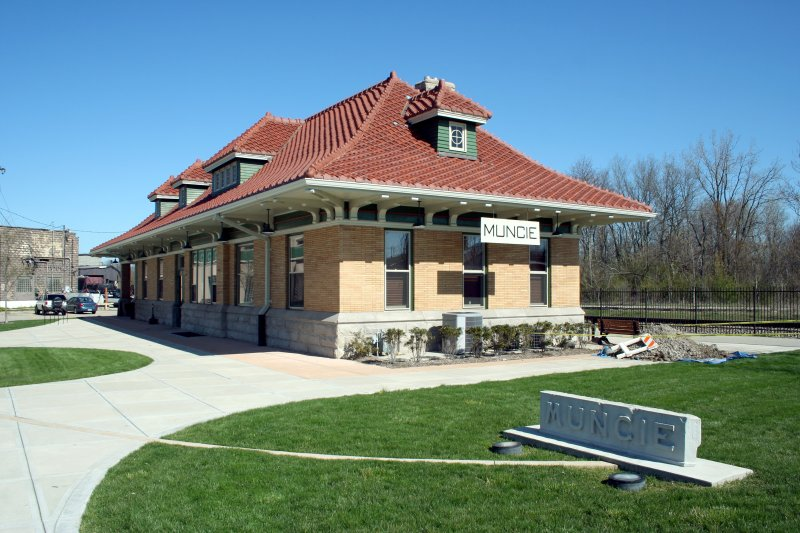
The former station in Muncie, Indiana, before the realignment via Indianapolis

The James Whitcomb Riley was renamed the Cardinal on October 30, 1977, as the cardinal was the state bird of all six states through which it ran. However, due to poor track conditions in Indiana, the train was rerouted numerous times, first over various Penn Central/Conrail routings that had once been part of the Pennsylvania Railroad, then ultimately over the former Baltimore and Ohio route via Cottage Grove by 1980.

The Cardinal was eventually extended to run along the Northeast Corridor again in an effort to improve the Cardinal's cost recovery ratio, but this time with the eastern terminus moved to New York. Previously, the Broadway Limited ran from New York to Chicago along the Northeast Corridor, but only as far south as Philadelphia. The train was discontinued on September 30, 1981, but revived on January 8, 1982, per a mandate initiated by Senator Robert C. Byrd. While the Cardinal and its predecessors had run daily, the revived Cardinal ran only three times per week. The revived train followed another new route, via Richmond and Muncie, Indiana. This arrangement lasted until April 27, 1986, when the train was finally moved to its current route via Indianapolis. On October 29, 1995, the Cardinal was truncated to Washington, D.C. after the consist was updated with Superliners. On October 27, 2002, after derailments on other routes depleted available Superliner cars, the Superliners were replaced with Viewliners. The Cardinal continued to operate the Chicago-Washington D.C. schedule. Service to New York was restored on Sunday's westbound Cardinal on October 26, 2003. Full service to New York resumed on April 26, 2004.

From March 29, 2018, to November 8, 2018, due to continuing construction at New York Penn Station, the Cardinal's eastern terminus was temporarily moved to Washington. Cardinal passengers needing to travel to or from points north of Washington were transferred to a Northeast Regional.

=== Hoosier State ===
With the Indianapolis routing, the Cardinal began operating jointly with the Chicago–Indianapolis Hoosier State. The Hoosier State operated to Indianapolis on the days the Cardinal did not, assuring seven-day service between Chicago and Indianapolis. This pattern ceased on October 25, 1987, when the Hoosier State became a full-fledged daily train once again. The Hoosier State was dropped on September 8, 1995, but resumed again on July 19, 1998, again running on days that the Cardinal did not run.

On December 17, 1999, Amtrak extended the Hoosier State to Jeffersonville, Indiana, (and later to Louisville, Kentucky) and renamed the train the Kentucky Cardinal. This new train was a daily service; on days when the Cardinal operated, the two trains ran combined between Indianapolis and Chicago. Amtrak ultimately discontinued the Kentucky Cardinal on July 4, 2003, and brought back the Hoosier State on the pre-1999 schedule.

After Indiana discontinued its subsidy, Amtrak suspended the Hoosier State as of June 30, 2019. Passengers who booked trips after that date were compensated with Cardinal tickets.

=== Plans ===
In the July 2010 issue of Trains magazine, the Cardinal was noted as being one of five routes under consideration for performance improvement. For the Cardinal, the proposed changes included increasing service from thrice-weekly to daily operation, and changing the western terminus to St. Louis, Missouri. Railfan and Railroad magazine also suggested that the train be rerouted to St. Louis, with a separate section bound for Chicago.

In early October 2010, Amtrak released a report detailing plans to increase the Cardinal's service from thrice-weekly to daily service, as well as increasing the train's on-time performance and food service. The January 2011 issue of Trains later revealed that Amtrak would scrap re-routing and Superliner conversion and instead adopt not only daily service, but also purchasing dome cars to be used along the Chicago-Washington, D.C. portion of the trip. In addition, the routing into Chicago Union Station would be changed and station platforms along the route containing coal dust would be scrubbed and cleaned.

However, obstacles to a daily Cardinal persist. Track capacity is limited on the Buckingham Branch Railroad, a short line railroad between Orange and Clifton Forge, Virginia where the Cardinal operates along former C&O/CSX trackage, preventing frequent freight trains from passing a daily Cardinal. This problem also applied to the planned-but-failed Greenbrier Presidential Express train, which would also have traversed the Buckingham Branch on a weekly basis. The Buckingham Branch requires additional funding to expand several sidings before allowing additional service. Another obstacle is freight congestion in Chicago particularly at the 75th Street Corridor on Chicago's South Side. The third obstacle is capacity at the Long Bridge in Washington, D.C. Infrastructure improvements are being made at all three. The Orange Branch between Orange and Gordonsville raised train speed after the completion of a track and signal project in 2017. The Chicago Region Environmental and Transportation Efficiency Program (CREATE) has received funding under a public–private partnership (P3) for the 75th Street Corridor with construction beginning in October 2018 and is scheduled to be finished by 2025. A parallel span of the Long Bridge began construction in 2024 and is expected to be completed by 2030.

Starting on October 1, 2019, traditional dining car services were removed and replaced with a reduced menu of "Flexible Dining" options. As a result, the changes to the consist of the train will have the dining car serve as a lounge car for the exclusive use of sleeping car passengers.

In June 2021, Senator Jon Tester of Montana added an amendment to the Surface Transportation Investment Act of 2021 which would require the Department of Transportation (not Amtrak itself) to evaluate daily service on all less frequent long-distance trains, meaning the Cardinal and Sunset Limited. The bill passed the Senate Commerce Committee with bipartisan support, and was later rolled into President Biden's Infrastructure Investment and Jobs Act (IIJA), which Congress passed on November 5, 2021. The report is known as the Amtrak Daily Long-Distance Service Study and must be delivered to Congress within two years. In mid-2023, Amtrak applied for a federal grant to operate the Cardinal daily and increase speeds between Indianapolis and Dyer. In December 2023 the daily Cardinal project was granted $500,000 from the IIJA through the Federal Railroad Administration's Corridor Identification and Development Program.

== Train consist ==
In the early 1990s, the Cardinal ran with the usual Amtrak long-distance consist of two EMD F40PHs or one GE E60, plus several material handling cars (MHC) and baggage cars, followed by several Amfleet coaches, an Amfleet lounge, a Heritage diner, two or three Heritage 10-6 sleepers, a slumbercoach, and finally, a baggage dormitory car. Following the delivery of the Superliner II fleet, however, the Cardinal was re-equipped with Superliner cars in 1995. As a result, its route was truncated to end in Washington D.C., as Superliners cannot operate on the Northeast Corridor due to low tunnel clearances in Baltimore and New York City. With the Superliner equipment, the consist would usually be two Superliner sleeping cars, a diner, a Sightseer Lounge, a baggage coach, and a coach.

In 2002, two derailments on other routes took numerous Superliner cars out of service. Because of this, insufficient Superliner equipment was available for use on the Cardinal. The Cardinal was re-equipped with a consist of single-level long-distance cars, including dining, lounge, sleeping, and dormitory cars, although service to New York was not restored until 2004. Subsequent fleet shortages shortened the Cardinal further, and at one point, the train was running with two or three Amfleet II coaches and a combined diner-lounge car. While the sleeping car was later restored, the Cardinal has not had a dormitory car or a diner since. Similarly, though the baggage car was also removed, it was restored in response to an upturn in patronage in mid-2010. In 2016, Amtrak added business class service to the Cardinal. The Cardinal seasonally included a dome car prior to the car's retirement.

Amtrak began replacing the older P40DC and P42DC locomotives with Siemens ALC-42 locomotives in 2023.

As of March 2025, the Cardinal's typical consist includes:

- P42DC or ALC-42 locomotive (1 ACS-64 electric locomotive used north of Washington DC)
- 3 Amfleet II coaches
- Amfleet II café/lounge car
- Viewliner II sleeping car
- Viewliner II baggage/dorm car

The Cardinal is used by Amtrak to ferry equipment between Chicago and Amtrak's Beech Grove Shops outside Indianapolis for repairs, so other equipment can be added to the train between those two locations.

== Route overview ==
Amtrak bills the Cardinal's route as one of the most scenic in its system. After an early morning departure from New York and traveling south down the Northeast Corridor, the train passes through Virginia's rolling horse country, across the Blue Ridge and the Shenandoah Valley. It then climbs the Allegheny Mountains and stops at the resort town of White Sulphur Springs, home to The Greenbrier, a famous luxury resort. The Cardinal descends on tracks through New River Gorge National Park and Preserve, a unit of the National Park Service protecting the longest deepest river gorge in the Eastern U.S. The river is popular for white water rafting, and the cliffs attract rock climbers. The forests blaze with autumn foliage and the train usually sells out during the peak season.

Amtrak train 51 arriving at Thurmond

The schedules are timed to allow trains to travel through the New River Gorge in daylight nearly all year. Westbound, the train travels at night from Charleston, West Virginia, on to Indianapolis, where it arrives at about dawn, reaching Chicago mid-morning. Eastbound, the Cardinal departs late afternoon, reaching Indianapolis before midnight, Charleston mid-morning, and New York City in the late evening. While Cincinnati is served both directions with stops after midnight, about 15,000 passengers a year arrive or depart from this station.

The Cardinal is one of only two of Amtrak's 15 long-distance trains to operate only three days a week, the other being the Sunset Limited.

== Route details ==
Cardinal route map

The Cardinal operates over Amtrak, CSX Transportation, Norfolk Southern Railway, Buckingham Branch Railroad, Canadian National Railway, Union Pacific Railroad, and Metra trackage:

- Amtrak Northeast Corridor, New York to Washington
- CSX RF&P Subdivision, Washington to Alexandria
- NS Washington District, Alexandria to Orange
- BB Orange Subdivision and North Mountain Subdivision, Orange to Clifton Forge
- CSX Alleghany Subdivision, New River Subdivision, Kanawha Subdivision, Russell Subdivision, Northern Subdivision, Cincinnati Subdivision, Cincinnati Terminal Subdivision, Indianapolis Subdivision, Indianapolis Terminal Subdivision, Crawfordsville Branch Subdivision, and Monon Subdivision, Clifton Forge to Munster
- CSX Elsdon Subdivision, (former GTW/CN) Munster to Thornton
- UP Villa Grove Subdivision, Thornton to 80th Street
- BRC Kenton Line Subdivision, 80th Street to 74th Street
- Metra SouthWest Service, 74th Street to Chicago (CP 518 connection to the NS.)
- NS Chicago Line, CP 518 to 21st Street.
- Amtrak from 21st Street to Union Station.

The Buckingham Branch trackage is one of the few Class III railroads used in the Amtrak system.

== Station stops ==
State/Province	Town/City	Station	Connections
Illinois	Chicago	Chicago Union Station	Amtrak (long-distance): California Zephyr, City of New Orleans, Empire Builder, Floridian, Lake Shore Limited, Southwest Chief, Texas Eagle; Amtrak (intercity): Blue Water, Borealis, Hiawatha, Illini and Saluki, Illinois Zephyr and Carl Sandburg, Lincoln Service, Pere Marquette, Wolverine; Metra: BNSF, Heritage Corridor, Milwaukee District North, Milwaukee District West, North Central Service, SouthWest Service; Chicago "L": Blue (at Clinton), Brown Orange Pink Purple (at Quincy); CTA Bus, Pace Bus; Amtrak Thruway to Madison, Rockford (Van Galder), Louisville (Greyhound)
Indiana	Dyer	Dyer	
Indiana	Rensselaer	Rensselaer	
Indiana	Lafayette	Lafayette	CityBus; Greyhound Lines
Indiana	Crawfordsville	Crawfordsville	
Indiana	Indianapolis	Indianapolis	IndyGo; Amtrak Thruway (Burlington Trailways); Greyhound Lines
Indiana	Connersville	Connersville	
Ohio	Cincinnati	Cincinnati	SORTA Metro
Kentucky	Maysville	Maysville	Maysville Transit
Kentucky	South Shore	South Portsmouth–South Shore	
Kentucky	Ashland	Ashland	Ashland Bus System; Greyhound Lines
West Virginia	Huntington	Huntington	Tri-State Transit Authority
West Virginia	Charleston	Charleston	Amtrak Thruway to Sutton/Flatwoods, Weston, Clarksburg, Fairmont, Morgantown (Barons Bus Lines); Kanawha Valley Regional Transportation Authority
West Virginia	Montgomery	Montgomery	Kanawha Valley Regional Transportation Authority
West Virginia	Thurmond	Thurmond	
West Virginia	Prince	Prince	
West Virginia	Hinton	Hinton	
West Virginia	Alderson	Alderson	
West Virginia	White Sulphur Springs	White Sulphur Springs	
Virginia	Clifton Forge	Clifton Forge	
Virginia	Staunton	Staunton	Staunton Free Trolley, Coordinated Area Transportation Services (at Staunton Visitor Center)
Virginia	Charlottesville	Charlottesville	Amtrak: Crescent, Northeast Regional; Amtrak Thruway to Richmond (Academy Bus Lines), Washington, D.C. Greyhound Lines; Charlottesville Area Transit
Virginia	Culpeper	Culpeper	Amtrak: Crescent, Northeast Regional
Virginia	Manassas	Manassas	Amtrak: Crescent, Northeast Regional; VRE: ■ Manassas Line; PRTC: Manassas Metro Direct, OmniLink Manassas
Virginia	Alexandria	Alexandria	Amtrak: Crescent, Floridian, Northeast Regional, Silver Meteor; VRE: ■ Fredericksburg Line, ■ Manassas Line; Metro: Blue Line, Yellow Line; Metrobus, DASH
District of Columbia	Washington	Washington; Union Station	Amtrak: Acela, Carolinian, Crescent, Floridian, Palmetto, Northeast Regional, Silver Meteor, Vermonter; MARC: ■ Brunswick Line, ■ Camden Line, ■ Penn Line; VRE: ■ Manassas Line, ■ Fredericksburg Line; Metro: Red Line; Metrobus, MTA Maryland, Loudoun County Transit, OmniRide; Intercity bus: Greyhound Lines, Megabus, BestBus, Peter Pan, OurBus
Maryland	Baltimore	Baltimore	Amtrak: Acela, Carolinian, Crescent, Palmetto, Northeast Regional, Silver Meteor, Vermonter; MARC: ■ Penn Line; Light RailLink; MTA Maryland, Charm City Circulator
Delaware	Wilmington	Wilmington	Amtrak: Acela, Carolinian, Crescent, Palmetto, Northeast Regional, Silver Meteor, Vermonter; Greyhound Lines; SEPTA Regional Rail: ■ Wilmington/Newark Line; DART First State
Pennsylvania	Philadelphia	30th Street Station	Amtrak: Acela, Carolinian, Crescent, Keystone Service, Northeast Regional, Palmetto, Pennsylvanian, Silver Meteor, Vermonter; SEPTA Regional Rail: all lines NJ Transit: ■ Atlantic City Line; SEPTA Metro: SEPTA City Bus, SEPTA Suburban Bus
New Jersey	Trenton	Trenton	Amtrak: Carolinian, Crescent, Keystone Service, Northeast Regional, Pennsylvanian, Silver Meteor, Vermonter; NJ Transit: ■ Northeast Corridor Line, ■ River Line; SEPTA Regional Rail: ■ Trenton Line; NJ Transit Bus, SEPTA Suburban Bus
New Jersey	Newark	Newark; Penn Station	Amtrak: Acela, Carolinian, Crescent, Keystone Service, Northeast Regional, Palmetto, Pennsylvanian, Silver Meteor, Vermonter; NJ Transit: ■ North Jersey Coast Line, ■ Northeast Corridor Line, ■ Raritan Valley Line; PATH: NWK-WTC; Newark Light Rail; NJ Transit Bus
New York	New York City	New York; Penn Station	Amtrak (long-distance): Crescent, Lake Shore Limited, Palmetto, Silver Meteor; Amtrak (intercity): Acela, Adirondack, Berkshire Flyer, Carolinian, Empire Service, Ethan Allen Express, Keystone Service, Maple Leaf, Northeast Regional, Pennsylvanian, Vermonter; LIRR: ■ City Terminal Zone, ■ Port Washington Branch; NJ Transit: ■ North Jersey Coast Line, ■ Northeast Corridor Line, ■ Gladstone Branch, ■ Montclair–Boonton Line, ■ Morristown Line; NYC Subway: PATH: HOB-33 JSQ-33 JSQ-33 (via HOB); NYC Transit Bus
