= Hinton, West Virginia =

City in West Virginia, US

- City
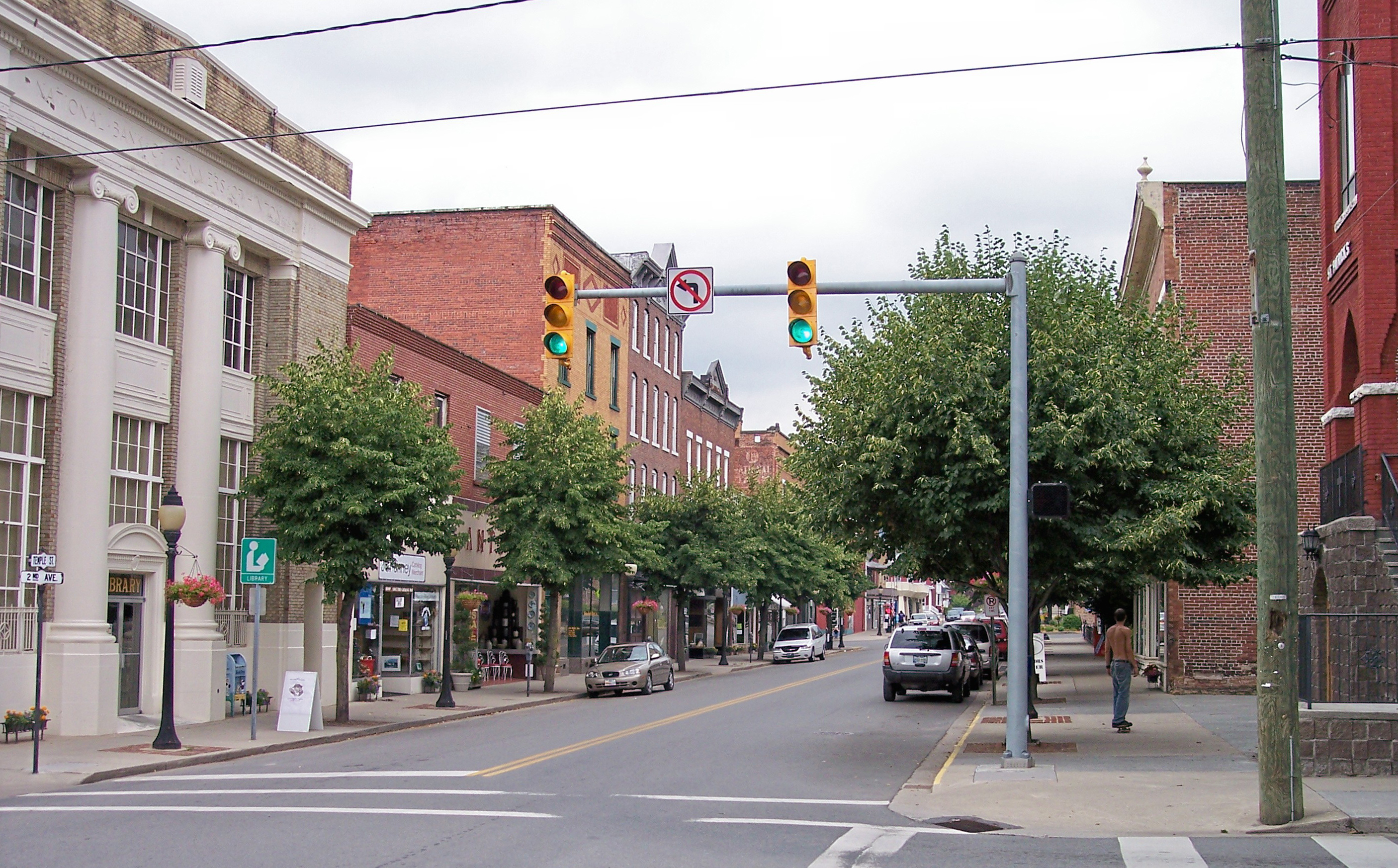
- Temple Street in downtown Hinton in 2007
- Motto(s): Where friends and rivers meet
- Interactive map of Hinton, West Virginia
- Location within West Virginia Location within the United States
- Coordinates: 37°40′25″N 80°53′20″W
- Country: United States
- State: West Virginia
- County: Summers

Government
  - Mayor: Jack L Scott
  - City Manager: Cris Meadows

Area
  - Total: 3.03 sq mi (7.85 km^{2})
  - Land: 2.23 sq mi (5.78 km^{2})
  - Water: 0.80 sq mi (2.07 km^{2})
- Elevation: 1,463 ft (446 m)

Population (2020)
  - Total: 2,245
  - Estimate (2021): 2,243
  - Density: 1,056/sq mi (407.6/km^{2})
- Time zone: UTC-5 (Eastern (EST))
  - Summer (DST): UTC-4 (EDT)
- ZIP code: 25951
- Area code: 304
- FIPS code: 54-37636
- GNIS feature ID: 1551458
- Website: hintonwva.com

Hinton is a city in and the county seat of Summers County, West Virginia, United States. The population was 2,266 at the 2020 census. Hinton was established in 1873 and chartered in 1897. Hinton was named after John "Jack" Hinton, the original owner of the town site. Much of Hinton's downtown was placed on the National Register of Historic Places in 1984.

== Geography and climate ==
Hinton is situated along the New River just north of its confluence with the Greenbrier River. Bluestone Lake is located near Hinton. The city is about 28 miles from Beckley and 90 miles from Charleston. According to the United States Census Bureau, the city has a total area of 3.03 square miles (7.85 km^{2}), of which 2.22 square miles (5.75 km^{2}) is land and 0.81 square miles (2.10 km^{2}) is water.

The climate in this area has mild differences between highs and lows, and there is adequate rainfall year-round. According to the Köppen Climate Classification system, Hinton has a marine west coast climate, abbreviated "Cfb" on climate maps.

== History ==
Hinton was incorporated at the confluence of the Greenbrier and New Rivers in 1880. Hinton was developed on land purchased by the Chesapeake and Ohio Railway in 1871 from the Ballengee family. The railroads arrival sparked growth in an area that was previously home to just six families. The town was laid out in 1874 and incorporated in 1880.

By 1892 the railway roundhouse and repair shop employed 540 people. Railroad prosperity supported a building boom between 1895 and 1907. Hinton merged with Avis and Bellepoint in 1927. In the 1950's, changes in coal mining and the switch to diesel locomotives led to layoffs and population decline.

== Demographics ==
Historical population
Census	Pop.	Note	%±
1880	879		—
1890	2,570		192.4%
1900	3,763		46.4%
1910	3,656		−2.8%
1920	3,912		7.0%
1930	6,654		70.1%
1940	5,815		−12.6%
1950	5,780		−0.6%
1960	5,197		−10.1%
1970	4,503		−13.4%
1980	4,428		−1.7%
1990	3,433		−22.5%
2000	2,880		−16.1%
2010	2,676		−7.1%
2020	2,245		−16.1%
2021 (est.)	2,243		−0.1%
U.S. Decennial Census

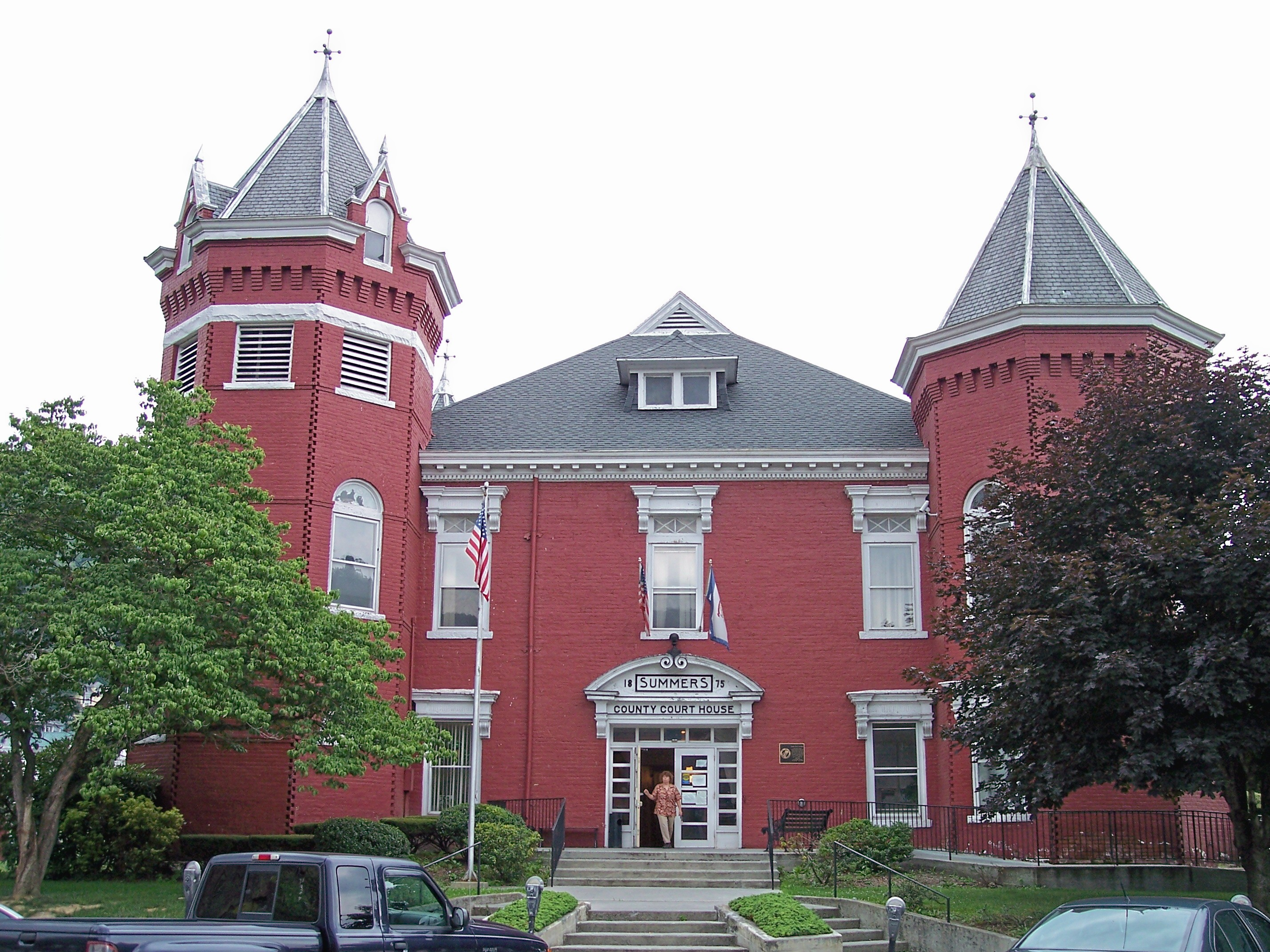
The Summers County Courthouse in Hinton

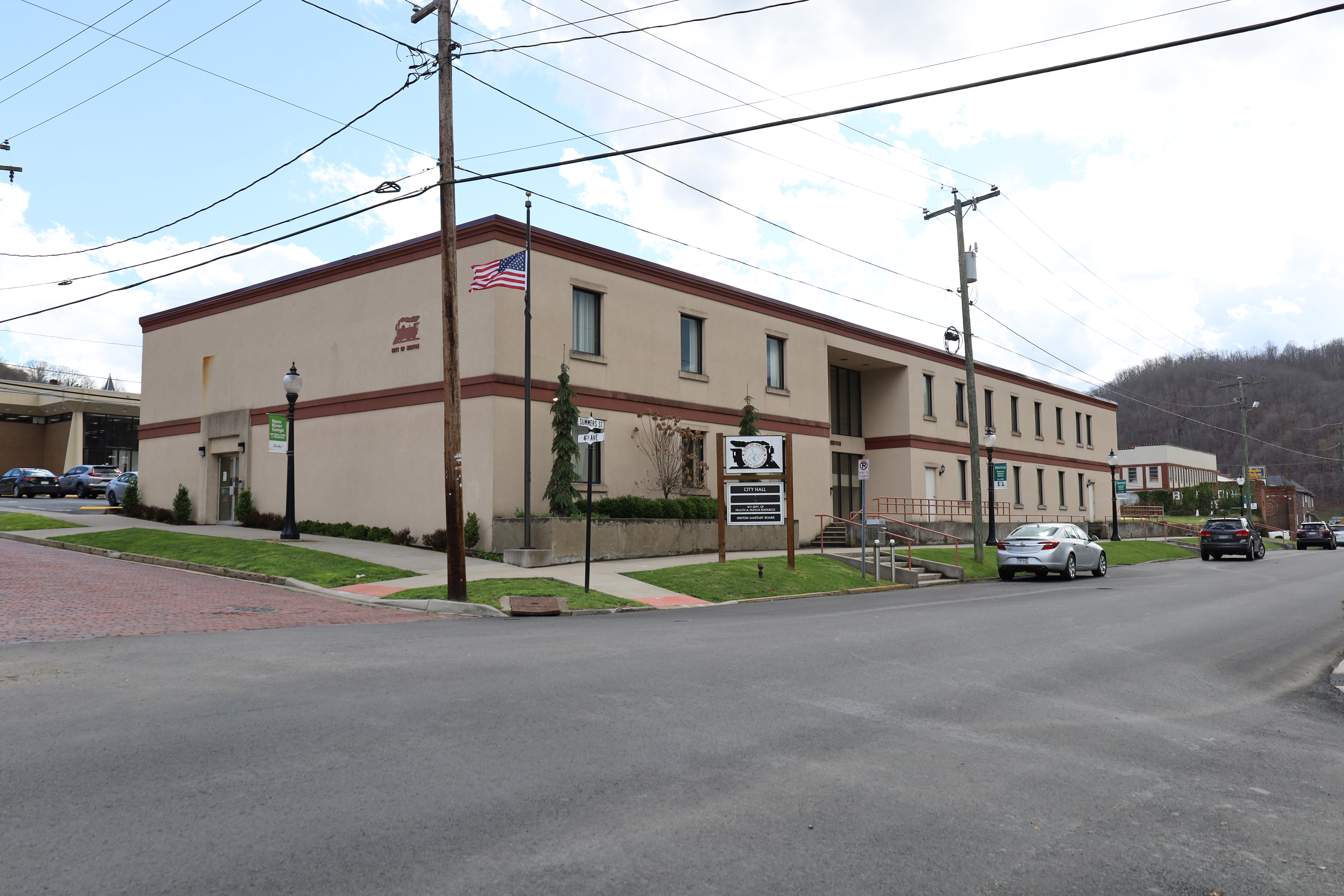
Hinton City Hall in 2022

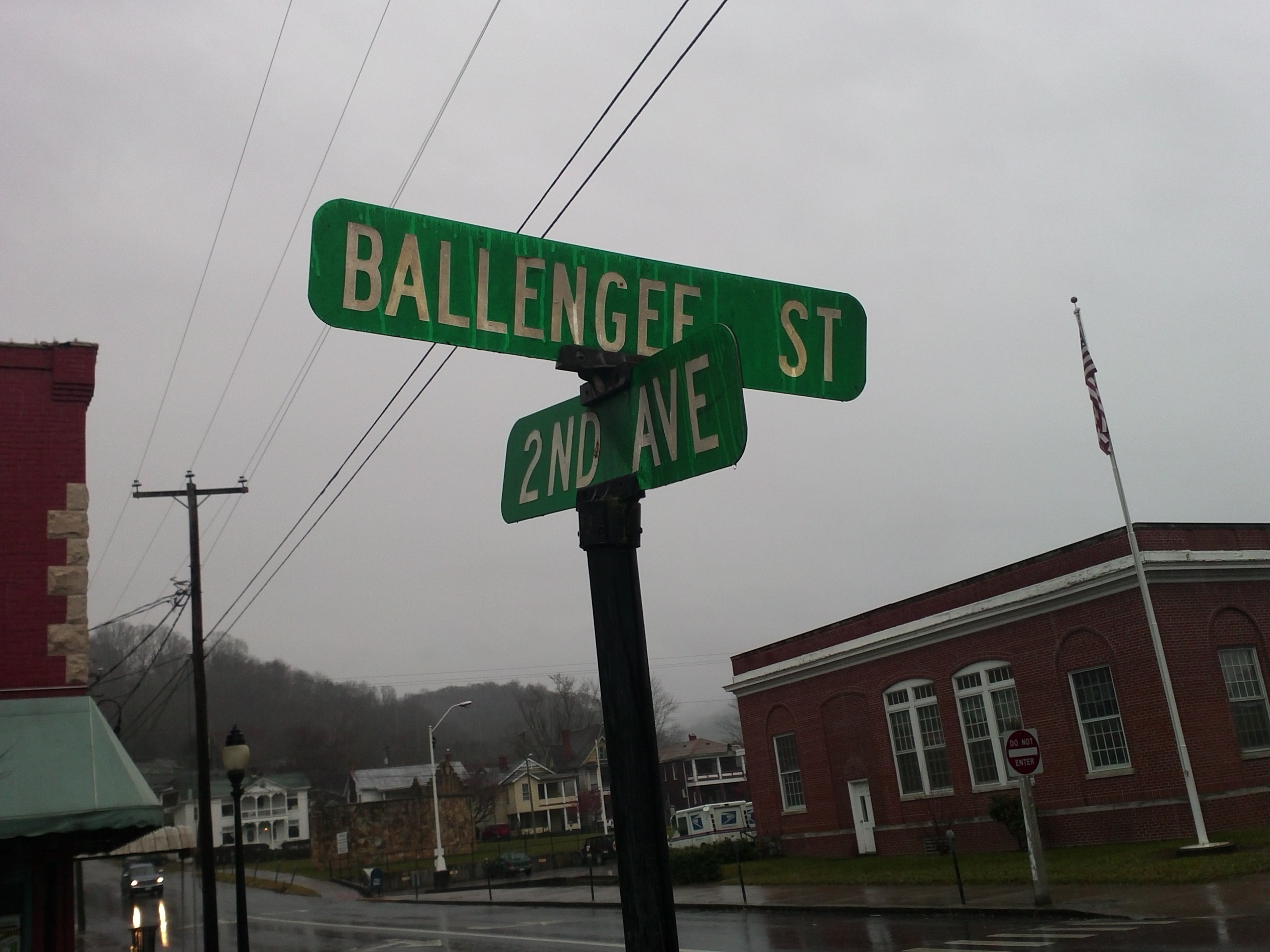
The earliest settlers on land that is today Hinton were Isaac and Jean Ballengee. Descendants of these original settlers have played important roles in the town's history, attested by the naming of Ballengee St in downtown Hinton.

=== 2020 census ===
As of the 2020 census, Hinton had a population of 2,245. The median age was 47.3 years. 19.3% of residents were under the age of 18 and 25.3% of residents were 65 years of age or older. For every 100 females there were 88.2 males, and for every 100 females age 18 and over there were 82.8 males age 18 and over.

0.0% of residents lived in urban areas, while 100.0% lived in rural areas.

There were 1,072 households in Hinton, of which 23.5% had children under the age of 18 living in them. Of all households, 31.0% were married-couple households, 23.0% were households with a male householder and no spouse or partner present, and 38.0% were households with a female householder and no spouse or partner present. About 41.0% of all households were made up of individuals and 21.0% had someone living alone who was 65 years of age or older.

There were 1,353 housing units, of which 20.8% were vacant. The homeowner vacancy rate was 4.0% and the rental vacancy rate was 4.2%.

Racial composition as of the 2020 census
Race	Number	Percent
White	2,011	89.6%
Black or African American	74	3.3%
American Indian and Alaska Native	8	0.4%
Asian	8	0.4%
Native Hawaiian and Other Pacific Islander	0	0.0%
Some other race	9	0.4%
Two or more races	135	6.0%
Hispanic or Latino (of any race)	31	1.4%

=== 2010 census ===
As of the census of 2010, there were 2,676 people, 1,276 households, and 676 families living in the city. The population density was 1,205.4 inhabitants per square mile (465.4/km^{2}). There were 1,604 housing units at an average density of 722.5 per square mile (279.0/km^{2}). The racial makeup of the city was 92.0% White, 5.3% African American, 0.1% Native American, 0.4% Asian, and 2.0% from two or more races. Hispanic or Latino of any race were 0.5% of the population.

There were 1,276 households, of which 21.9% had children under the age of 18 living with them, 34.8% were married couples living together, 13.2% had a female householder with no husband present, 4.9% had a male householder with no wife present, and 47.0% were non-families. 42.9% of all households were made up of individuals, and 22% had someone living alone who was 65 years of age or older. The average household size was 2.07 and the average family size was 2.83.

The median age in the city was 46 years. 19.4% of residents were under the age of 18; 6.9% were between the ages of 18 and 24; 22.3% were from 25 to 44; 28.2% were from 45 to 64; and 23.2% were 65 years of age or older. The gender makeup of the city was 46.6% male and 53.4% female.

=== 2000 census ===
As of the census of 2000, there were 2,880 people, 1,357 households, and 755 families living in the city. The population density was 1,244.5 people per square mile (481.4/km^{2}). There were 1,595 housing units at an average density of 689.2 per square mile (266.6/km^{2}). The racial makeup of the city was 92.43% White, 5.49% African American, 0.52% Native American, 0.21% Asian, 0.10% Pacific Islander, 0.07% from other races, and 1.18% from two or more races. Hispanic or Latino of any race were 0.73% of the population.

There were 1,357 households, out of which 19.4% had children under the age of 18 living with them, 40.1% were married couples living together, 12.6% had a female householder with no husband present, and 44.3% were non-families. 41.3% of all households were made up of individuals, and 22.7% had someone living alone who was 65 years of age or older. The average household size was 2.10 and the average family size was 2.85.

In the city, the population was spread out, with 19.4% under the age of 18, 7.3% from 18 to 24, 22.8% from 25 to 44, 24.3% from 45 to 64, and 26.2% who were 65 years of age or older. The median age was 45 years. For every 100 females, there were 82.6 males. For every 100 females age 18 and over, there were 79.2 males.

The median income for a household in the city was $20,323, and the median income for a family was $25,769. Males had a median income of $23,654 versus $25,543 for females. The per capita income for the city was $13,909. About 22.6% of families and 27.6% of the population were below the poverty line, including 35.1% of those under age 18 and 15.2% of those age 65 or over.

== Arts and culture ==
There are several museums in Hinton, including the Veterans Memorial Museum, the Hinton Railroad Museum, and King's Civil War Museum. City of Hinton Parks and recreation department has a water park complete with a water slide and swimming pool.

In 1994, part of Paramount's film Lassie was shot in Hinton.

== Economy and transportation ==
Hinton's economy largely relies on transportation, information technology, and tourism. Major employers in Hinton include CSX Transportation, Summers County Schools, and ManTech International. Headquartered in Hinton, PracticeLink is the largest job bank for physicians in the United States.

Amtrak provides national passenger rail service to Hinton via the Cardinal route, which stops at Hinton Station. CSX owns the rail line through Hinton, which is the mainline of the former Chesapeake and Ohio Railway. Hinton was a major terminal for the C&O.

In the 1990s, Hinton's downtown experienced economic decline after a hospital moved away and Interstate 64 bypassed the town.

In 2007, Hinton native and business owner Ken Allman founded MountainPlex Properties, which since then has worked to preserve and revitalize the Hinton Historic District.

== Notable people ==
- Sylvia Mathews Burwell, 22nd United States Secretary of Health and Human Services
- Jack Warhop, Major League Baseball player
- John Davis Chandler, American actor
- Dick Leftridge, National Football League player for the Pittsburgh Steelers
