= Peru station =

Former train station in Indiana

Peru, IN
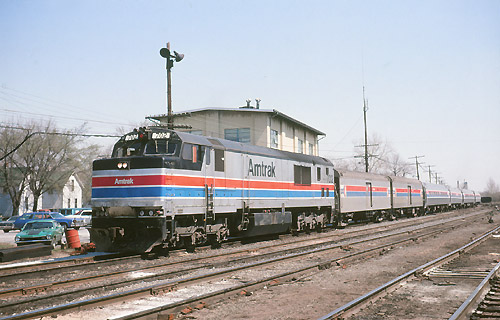
- The James Whitcomb Riley at Peru in August 1977

General information
- Location: 201 West Canal Street; Peru, Indiana
- Coordinates: 40.7482°N 86.0736°W

History
- Opened: September 24, 1974
- Closed: April 27, 1986

Former services
Preceding station	Amtrak	Following station
Gary toward Chicago	Cardinal 1977–1986	Marion toward New York
Chicago Terminus	Mountaineer 1975–1977	Marion toward Norfolk
Chicago Terminus	James Whitcomb Riley 1974–1977	Marion toward Washington, D.C. or Newport News
Preceding station	Chesapeake and Ohio Railway	Following station
Hoover toward Hammond	Chicago, Cincinnati & Louisville Railroad until 1949	Santa Fe toward Cincinnati
Location

Peru station was a railway station in Peru, Indiana. It was served by Amtrak from 1974 to 1986.

== History ==
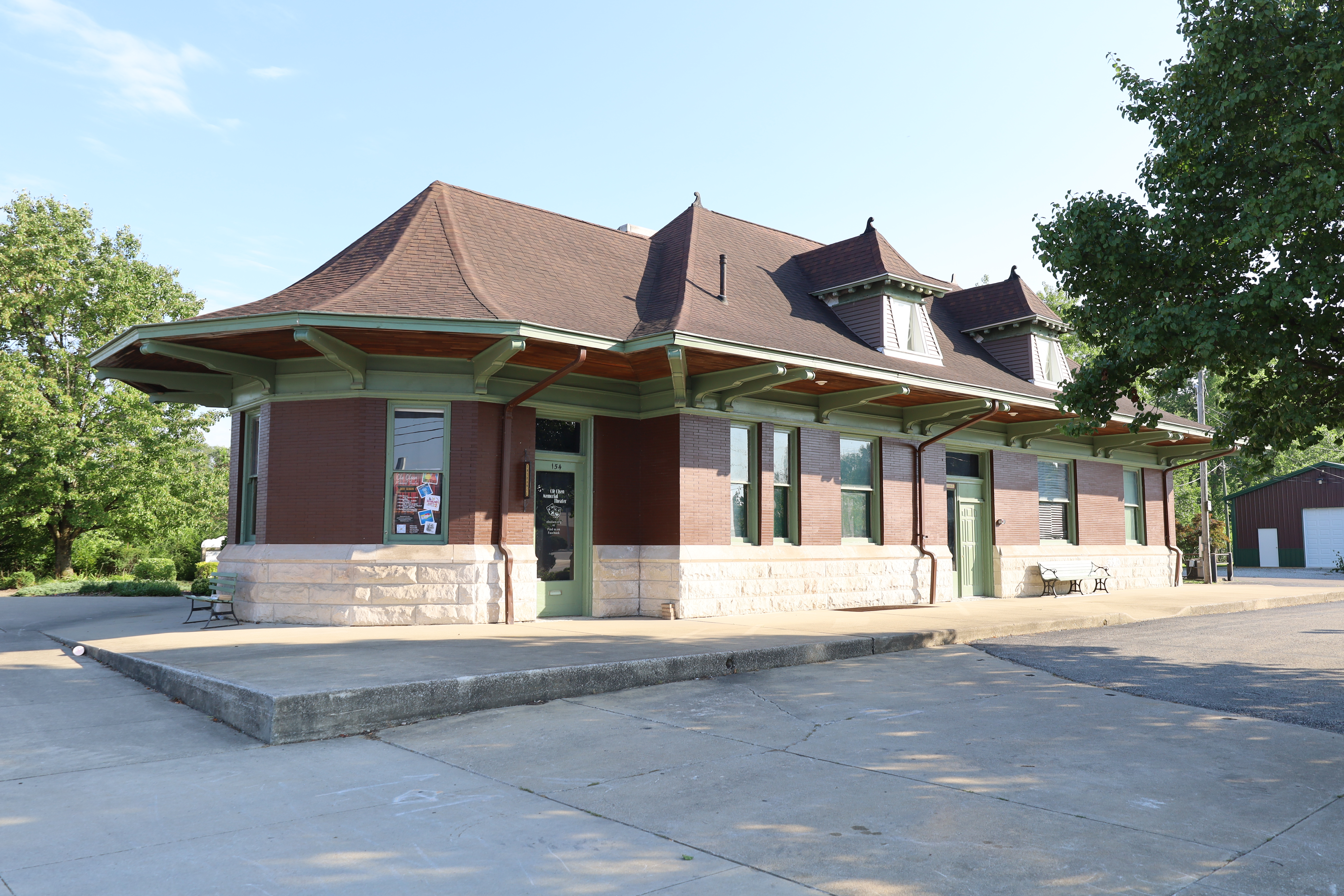
The former C&O station that was used until 1949

The James Whitcomb Riley was detoured to the Chesapeake and Ohio Railway (C&O) between Chicago and Cincinnati on August 1, 1974. It was the first passenger service on the line since 1949. Amtrak added stops at Peru, Muncie, and Richmond on September 25, 1974. At Peru, the train stopped near a C&O yard building rather than the former station building. No ticket office was available. The Mountaineer, combined with the Riley, served Peru from March 25, 1975, to April 23, 1977.

The James Whitcomb Riley was renamed as the Cardinal on October 30, 1977. On April 27, 1986, the Cardinal moved to a new routing between Chicago and Cincinnati using the ex-Monon Railroad and ex-Baltimore and Ohio Railroad. This ended service to Peru, Muncie, and Richmond. The station building was subsequently torn down and the tracks were removed to allow for construction of the Peru Riverwalk.
