= South Portsmouth–South Shore station =

Railway station in South Shore, Kentucky

So. Portsmouth-So. Shore, KY
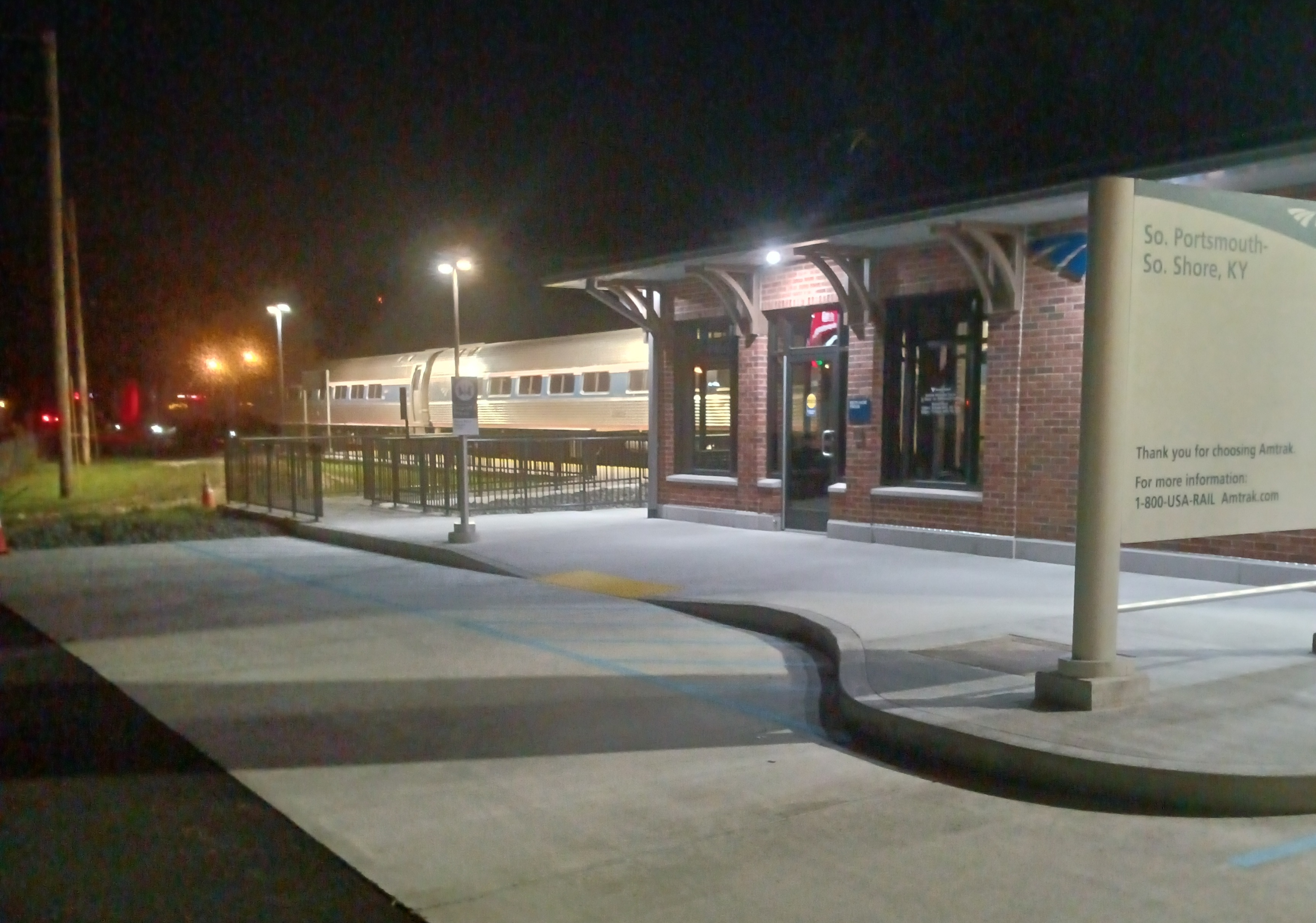
- The Cardinal at South Portsmouth–South Shore in July 2023

General information
- Location: Main Street and U.S. Route 23; South Shore, Kentucky; United States
- Coordinates: 38.7212°N 82.9637°W
- Owner: Amtrak (building); CSX Transportation (parking lot & platform)
- Line: CSX Cincinnati Subdivision
- Platforms: 1 side platform
- Tracks: 2

Construction
- Accessible: Yes

Other information
- Station code: Amtrak: SPM

History
- Opened: June 15, 1976
- Rebuilt: 2023

Passengers
- FY 2025: 1,454 (Amtrak)

Services
Preceding station	Amtrak	Following station
Maysville toward Chicago	Cardinal	Ashland toward New York
Former services
Preceding station	Amtrak	Following station
Cincinnati (River Road) Maysville after June 1977 toward Chicago	James Whitcomb Riley 1976–1977	Tri-State toward Washington, D.C.
Cincinnati (River Road) toward Chicago	Mountaineer 1976–1977	Tri-State toward Norfolk
Preceding station	Chesapeake and Ohio Railway	Following station
Vanceburg toward Cincinnati	Main Line	Limeville toward Washington, D.C. or Phoebus
Location

South Portsmouth–South Shore station is an Amtrak intercity rail station in South Shore, Kentucky. It primarily serves the city of Portsmouth, Ohio, located across the Ohio River.

== History ==
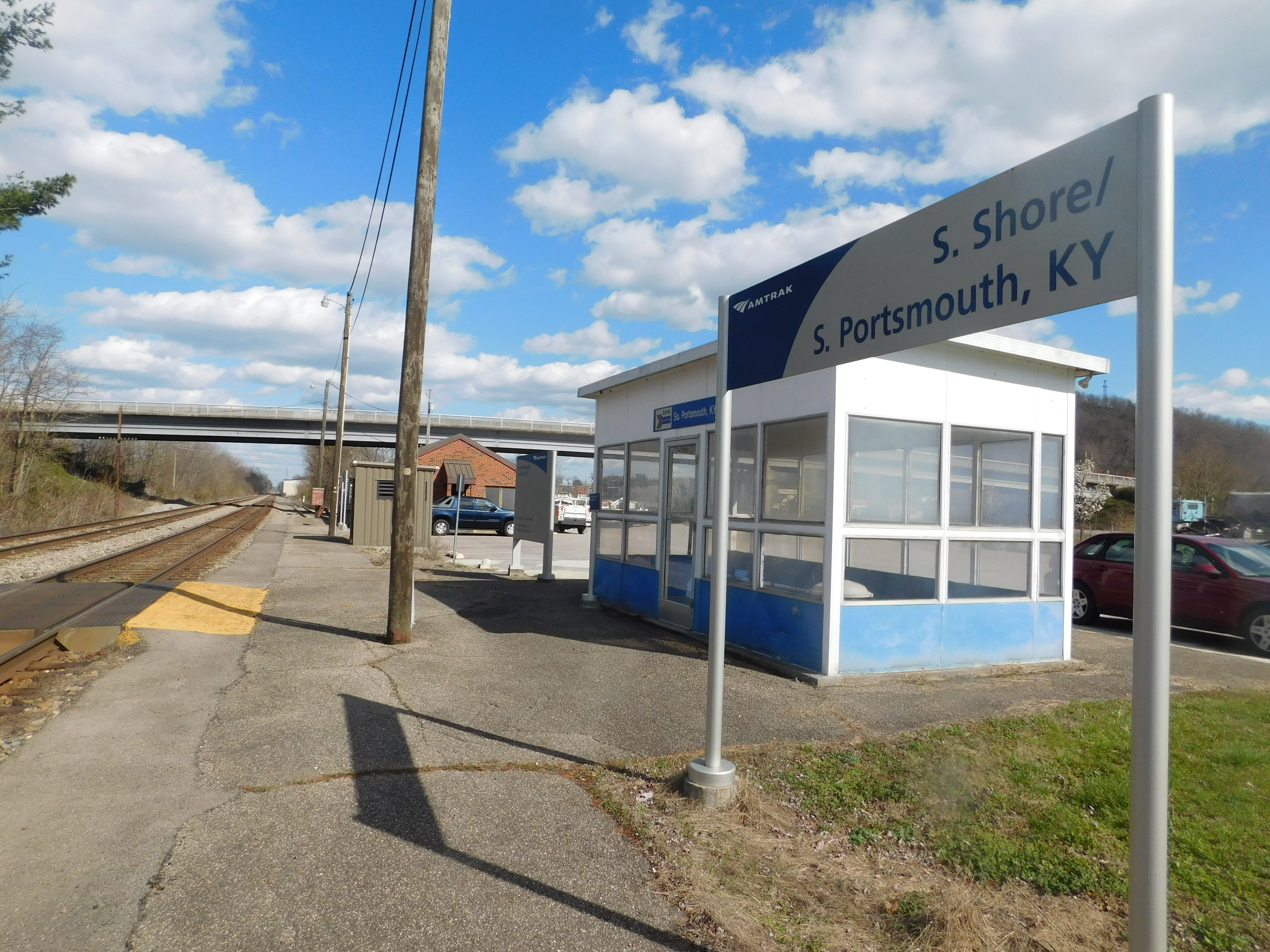
The original station shelter and platform in 2017.

In pre-Amtrak years several C&O trains served a different station in Portsmouth: Fast Flying Virginian (west to Cincinnati, and sections east to Washington, D.C., and Newport News), George Washington (sections west to Cincinnati and Louisville, and sections east to Washington, D.C. and Newport News) and the Sportsman (northwest to Detroit, and sections east to Washington, D.C., and Newport News). Norfolk & Western trains called at another station in Portsmouth: Pocahantas (Cincinnati and Columbus – Norfolk) and Powhatan Arrow (Cincinnati – Norfolk).

The station was opened as a flag stop for the James Whitcomb Riley and Mountaineer on June 15, 1976. Service to the stop was suspended on April 29, 1979, but resumed on April 27, 1980. In January 2011, the station was made accessible (with a wheelchair lift) using American Recovery and Reinvestment Act funding. The original shelter, built when the station opened in 1976, was replaced by a brick structure in early 2023. In addition to the new station building, improvements include new lighting and fencing as well as a new concrete platform with tactile edging replacing the original asphalt platform.
