= Marion station (Amtrak) =

Marion, IN

General information
- Location: 601 West 10th Street; Marion, Indiana
- Coordinates: 40.5517°N 85.6664°W
- Line: Chesapeake and Ohio Railway

History
- Opened: 1975
- Closed: April 27, 1986

Former services
Preceding station	Amtrak	Following station
Peru toward Chicago	Cardinal	Muncie toward New York
Peru toward Chicago	Mountaineer	Muncie toward Norfolk
Peru toward Chicago	James Whitcomb Riley	Muncie toward Washington, D.C. or Newport News
Preceding station	Chesapeake and Ohio Railway	Following station
Phoenix toward Hammond	Chicago, Cincinnati & Louisville Railroad	Deer Creek toward Cincinnati
Location

Marion station was a train station in Marion, Indiana.

== History ==
The station was added as a stop on Amtrak's Mountaineer and James Whitcomb Riley in 1975. Passenger service to Marion ended in 1986 when the Cardinal (renamed from the James Whitcomb Riley in 1977) was rerouted onto the former Baltimore and Ohio Railroad in Ohio and Indiana, and the former Monon Railroad (alongside the Hoosier State train) north-west of Indianapolis.

The station building was subsequently torn down and the tracks were removed to allow for construction of a rail trail.

== See also ==
- Marion PCC & St. Louis Railroad Depot
