= Cincinnati River Road station =

Amtrak rail station in Ohio, US

Cincinnati, OH
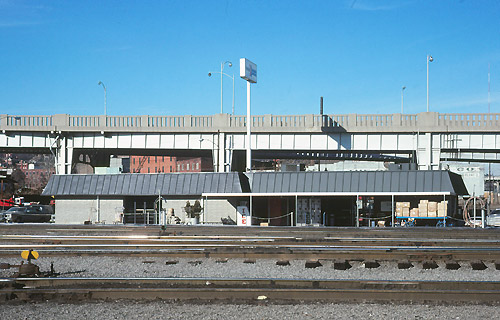
- Cincinnati River Road station in December 1976

General information
- Location: 1901 River Road, Cincinnati, Ohio
- Coordinates: 39°6′6.52″N 84°32′54.66″W
- Line: Central Railroad of Indiana (ex-NYC)

History
- Opened: October 29, 1972
- Closed: July 29, 1991

Former services
Preceding station	Amtrak	Following station
Hamilton (Note: The preceding station was Richmond until August 3, 1980.) toward Chicago	Cardinal 1977–1991	Maysville toward New York
Terminus	Shenandoah 1976–1981	Loveland toward Washington, D.C.
Richmond toward Chicago	Mountaineer 1975–1977	South Portsmouth–South Shore (Note: The following station was Tri-State until June 15, 1976.) toward Norfolk
Richmond (Note: The preceding station was Indianapolis until August 1, 1974; from August 1 until September 25, the Riley did not make any stops between Cincinnati and Chicago.) toward Chicago	James Whitcomb Riley 1974–1977	Maysville (Note: The following station was Ashland until March 24, 1975; then Tri-State until June 15, 1976; then South Portsmouth–South Shore until June 12, 1977.) toward Washington, D.C.
Indianapolis toward Chicago	James Whitcomb Riley and George Washington 1972–1974	Ashland toward Washington, D.C. or Newport News
Location

Cincinnati River Road station was an Amtrak intercity rail station located south of River Road (U.S. Route 50) west of downtown Cincinnati, Ohio. It opened in October 1972 to replace the underused Cincinnati Union Terminal, and closed in July 1991 when Amtrak moved service back to the restored Union Terminal.

== History ==
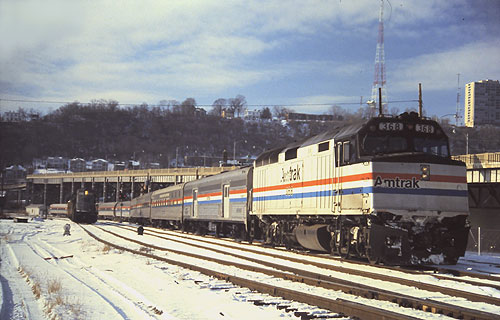
The Cardinal at the station in 1989

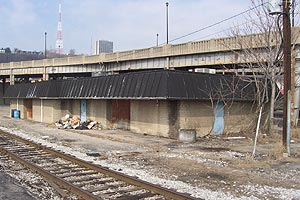
The abandoned station in 2005

Cincinnati Union Terminal, opened in 1933, was among the last grand big-city stations built in the United States. In its heyday, it served up to 216 trains per day. On May 1, 1971, when Amtrak took over intercity passenger rail service, the station's service was reduced to just two routes: the James Whitcomb Riley to Chicago and the George Washington to Washington and Newport News. Less than three months later, on July 12, the Riley and George Washington merged into a single long-distance Chicago-Washington train, with the eastbound train known as the George Washington and the westbound train known as the James Whitcomb Riley. The two trains had been inherited from different railroads — the Riley from Penn Central (formerly New York Central), the George from the Chesapeake and Ohio Railway (C&O) — and turning the train to the proper direction required a half-hour trip around a balloon loop north of Union Terminal. These two daily trains, which between them saw fewer than 30 boardings and alightings per day, were nowhere near enough to justify the station's annual $4 million operating cost.

In 1972, construction began on a new, smaller station building. It sat on the south side of the River Road highway viaduct, about 0.8 miles (1.3 km) southwest of Union Terminal and 2 miles (3.2 km) west of downtown Cincinnati. At 1,500 square feet, it was a tiny fraction of the size of the 504,000-square-foot Union Terminal. The new station had a modern design based on a standard template. It featured a 25-seat air conditioned waiting room, a ticket counter, restrooms, a crew room, and a parking lot for 30 cars. The building itself cost $90,000. The station and its parking lot were designed so that both could be enlarged if traffic increased.

The new Cincinnati River Road station opened on October 29, 1972, having cost a total of $270,000. It was expected to save the company $500,000 in annual operating costs. It was located on the ex-New York Central line between Cincinnati and Indianapolis used by the Riley/George, and thus avoided the need for the slow loop turnaround.

However, on October 6, 1973, Amtrak rerouted the Riley/George off of deteriorating ex-NYC track in Indiana and onto ex-Pennsylvania Railroad (PRR) trackage between Indianapolis and Cincinnati. Because the PRR approached Cincinnati from the east rather than the west, a long and complex backup move was necessary for trains to reach River Road station.

On May 19, 1974, the George Washington name was dropped, and the James Whitcomb Riley name was applied in both directions. On August 1, 1974, Amtrak rerouted the Riley off Penn Central trackage altogether, switching it to C&O trackage between Chicago and Cincinnati. However, the C&O approached Cincinnati from the north and a backup move was still required.

The Chicago-Norfolk Mountaineer began service through Cincinnati on March 24, 1975, followed by the Cincinnati-Washington, D.C. Shenandoah on October 31, 1976. On October 30, 1977, the Riley was renamed the Cardinal. Yet another reroute of the Cardinal — this one between Cincinnati and Cottage Grove, Indiana, on the Baltimore and Ohio Railroad, on July 17, 1978 — still required a backup move to serve River Road station.

The Mountaineer was discontinued on June 1, 1977. The Shenandoah and Cardinal were both discontinued on September 30, 1981, amid budget cuts, briefly ending rail service to Cincinnati. However, the Cardinal was restored on January 8, 1982. In 1990, Union Terminal was remodeled and renamed the Cincinnati Museum Center at Union Terminal. The remodel enabled Amtrak to return to Union Terminal on July 29, 1991, at last eliminating the backup moves required for River Road service. The River Road station was demolished in 2010 when the adjacent Waldvogel Viaduct was realigned.
