= Richmond station (Chesapeake and Ohio Railway) =

Railway station in Richmond, Indiana

Richmond, IN
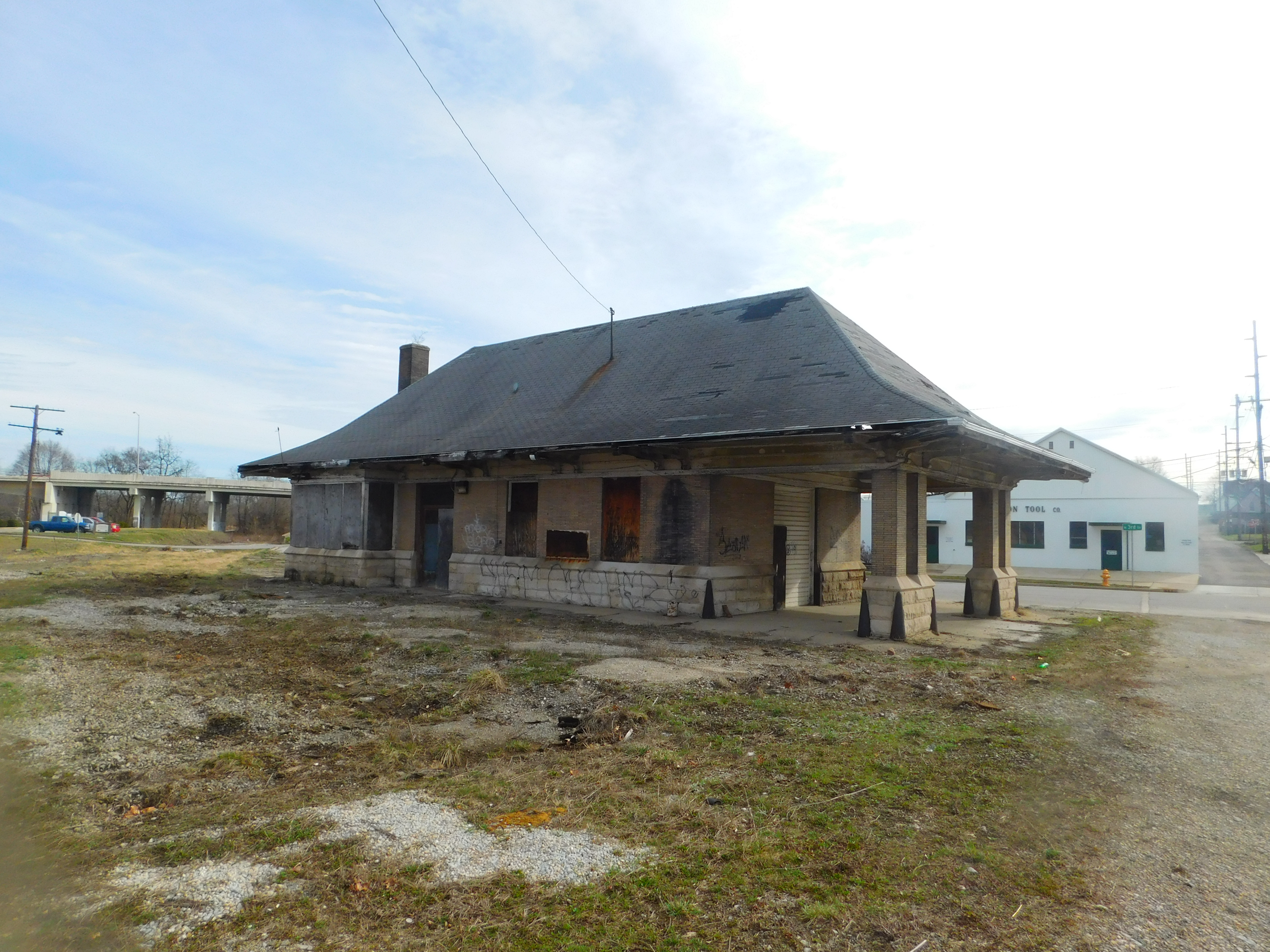

General information
- Location: 300 North Third and C Streets; Richmond, Indiana
- Coordinates: 39.8327°N 84.8975°W

History
- Opened: c. 1900–1910; 1974 (Amtrak)
- Closed: c. 1950; April 27, 1986
- Original company: Chicago, Cincinnati and Louisville Railroad

Services
Preceding station	Amtrak	Following station
Muncie toward Chicago	Cardinal	Hamilton toward New York
Muncie toward Chicago	Mountaineer	Cincinnati (River Road) toward Norfolk
Preceding station	Chesapeake and Ohio Railway	Following station
Webster toward Hammond	Chicago, Cincinnati & Louisville Railroad	South Richmond toward Cincinnati
Location

Richmond station is a former railway station in Richmond, Indiana. It is located near the corner of North C and North Third Streets.

The Chicago, Cincinnati and Louisville Railroad built their line through the area in the decade prior to 1910, though they were a later addition to the railroad network in the area. As such, passenger traffic was never substantial. The Chesapeake and Ohio Railway acquired the line and station in 1910, but would go on to only run a single daily local train between Chicago (later Hammond) and Cincinnati which operated until about 1950.

Amtrak took over intercity rail service in 1971 and began routing the inherited James Whitcomb Riley through Richmond starting in 1974. The accompanying Mountaineer stopped at the station for its operational life between 1977 and 1979. The train would go on to be renamed the Cardinal, but Richmond was bypassed in 1986.

Tracks were removed and the right of way adjacent to the station building was converted to the Cardinal Trail.
