= Muncie station (Chesapeake and Ohio Railway) =

Restored train station in Indiana, US

Muncie, IN
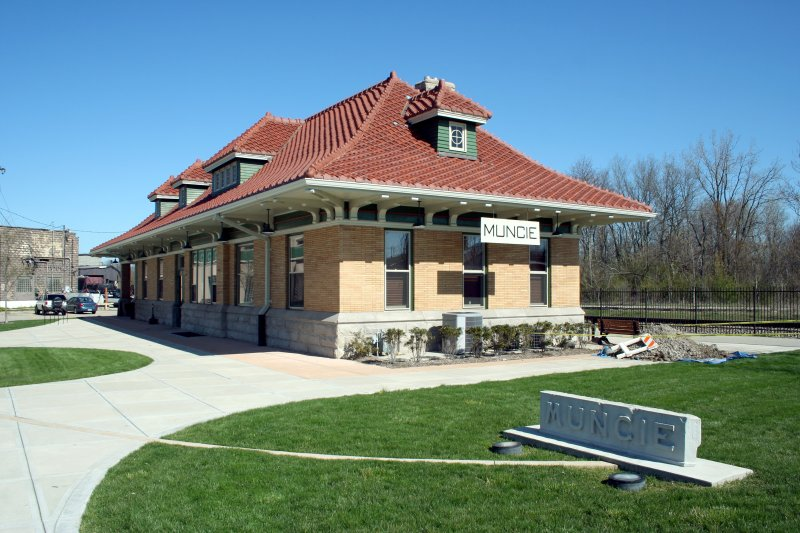
- The depot as seen in 2007

General information
- Location: 700 East Wysor Street; Muncie, Indiana

History
- Opened: 1901; 1973
- Closed: 1949; April 27, 1986
- Rebuilt: 1974

Former services
Preceding station	Amtrak	Following station
Marion toward Chicago	Cardinal	Richmond toward New York
Marion toward Chicago	Mountaineer	Richmond toward Norfolk
Preceding station	Chesapeake and Ohio Railway	Following station
Jonesboro toward Hammond	Chicago, Cincinnati & Louisville Railroad	Losantville toward Cincinnati
- Cincinnati, Richmond, & Muncie Depot
- U.S. National Register of Historic Places
- Interactive map of Cincinnati, Richmond, & Muncie Depot
- Coordinates: 40.1976°N 85.3791°W
- Architect: William S. Kaufman; Locke & Hill
- Architectural style: Romanesque
- NRHP reference No.: 97000304
- Added to NRHP: April 14, 1997
Location

Muncie station (also known as the Wysor Street Depot) is a restored train station in Muncie, Indiana, United States. Built in 1901, it was acquired by the Chesapeake and Ohio Railway in 1910. The station was used for passenger train service throughout the 20th century and was added to the National Register of Historic Places in 1997. It is currently used as a visitor center and office for the adjacent Cardinal Greenway.

== History ==
The station was built in 1901 by the Cincinnati, Richmond and Muncie Railroad (CR&M), which was acquired by the Chesapeake and Ohio Railway (C&O) in 1910. Into the early 1930s, an unnamed C&O night train from Chicago to Cincinnati stopped at the station. However, by 1938, that service was shortened to a day train from Hammond to Cincinnati. For the concluding Hammond - Chicago segment, the C&O arranged with the Monon Railroad to accept C&O tickets for that segment of the trip. C&O ceded the responsibility of carrying the sleeping cars from Chicago to Cincinnati to the New York Central.

The C&O ended passenger service to Muncie in 1949, but the station was used for freight service until 1950, when the Muncie Gear Works became its new tenant.

In 1973, Chessie System (which eventually became CSX Transportation) restored the station for passenger service so it could be used by Amtrak on the James Whitcomb Riley and George Washington routes (which eventually became the Cardinal). The station was again removed from passenger service when the Cardinal was rerouted after April 27, 1986. The station was listed on the National Register of Historic Places on April 14, 1997. Restoration of the station began in 2003 and involved replacing the original Ludowici tiles with new ones produced by the same manufacturer. The restoration was completed and the building reopened to the public on June 5, 2005.

The building is now used as a visitor center and office for the Cardinal Greenway recreation trail, which uses the former C&O right-of-way. On display inside are photos and artifacts from the region's railroad history as well as photographs of the surrounding communities. Although the former C&O track has since been removed, a second parallel track, now owned by the Norfolk Southern Railway, remains in operation; it is separated from the Cardinal Greenway trail by a safety fence.

== See also ==
- Muncie Union Station
