= Welch station =

Former train station in Welch, West Virginia, US

Welch, WV
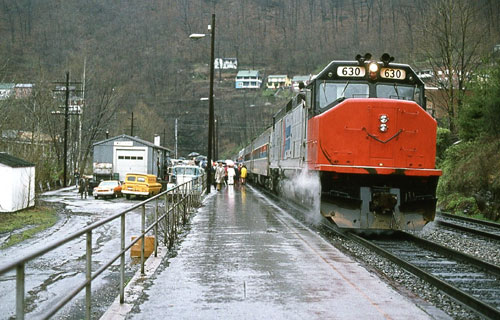
- The Mountaineer at Welch station in 1975

General information
- Location: Howard Street; Welch, West Virginia
- Coordinates: 37.4355°N 81.5782°W
- Line: NS Pocahontas District

History
- Opened: 1975
- Closed: 1971; 1979

Former services
Preceding station	Amtrak	Following station
Williamson toward Tri-State	Hilltopper 1977–1979	Bluefield toward Boston South
Williamson toward Chicago	Mountaineer 1975–1977	Bluefield toward Norfolk
Preceding station	Norfolk and Western Railway	Following station
Williamson toward Cincinnati	Main Line until 1971	North Folk toward Norfolk
Location

Welch station is a former train station in Welch, West Virginia, United States. The station was built by the Norfolk and Western Railway, which served it until April 30, 1971. Amtrak service to Welch began with the Mountaineer on March 24, 1975. The station was renovated in preparation for the service. The Mountaineer was replaced with the Hilltopper on June 1, 1977. The Hilltopper was discontinued on September 30, 1979, ending service to Welch.
