= Daniel Henry =

Daniel Henry is the name of:

- Daniel Maynadier Henry (1823–1899), Maryland politician
- Dan Henry (1913–2012), inventor of bicycle route markings
- Danny Henry (born 1988), Scottish mixed martial artist
- M. Daniel Henry (1940–2014), Catholic university administrator

== See also ==
- Henry Daniel (disambiguation)
