= Henry Daniel =

Henry Daniel may refer to:

- Henry Daniel (friar) (fl. 1379), English Dominican friar
- Henry Daniel (politician) (1786–1873), United States Representative from Kentucky
- Henry Daniel (classicist) (1836–1919), English classicist and clergyman, Provost of Worcester College, Oxford, and operator of the Daniel Press

== See also ==
- Henry Daniell (1894–1963), English actor
- Henry Daniels (disambiguation)
- Harry Daniel (disambiguation)
- Daniel Henry (disambiguation)
