= Cardinal Greenway =

Shared-use path in Indiana

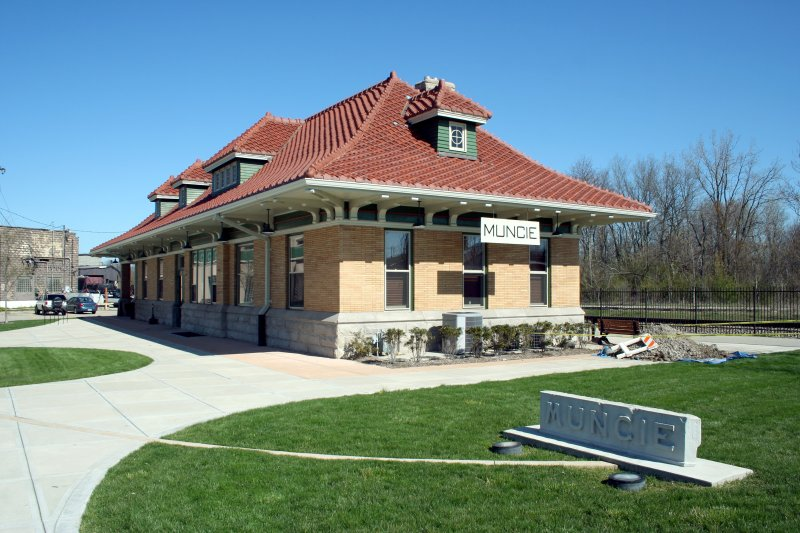
- The former Wysor Street Depot now Cardinal Greenway offices in Muncie
- Length: 62 mi (100 km)
- Location: Indiana
- Designation: multi-use recreational system
- Trailheads: Sweetser40.57224°N 85.80667°W; Richmond 39.833°N 84.89750°W
- Use: Walking; Biking; Horse riding

The Cardinal Greenway is a multi-use trail that crosses five counties in eastern Indiana. The trail follows a former CSX railbed between Richmond, Indiana and Marion, Indiana. It is named after the Cardinal, the last remaining regular passenger train service on the Chicago-Cincinnati-Washington route. Currently, it is the longest rail trail in Indiana.

The route crosses nine bridges and passes the Wysor Street Depot in Muncie, Indiana. The trail is marked in half-mile increments, and has more than 20 trailheads, most with restrooms, parking areas, and interpretive markers.

The trail connects to multiple other trails along its length, including the White River Greenway in Muncie, and the Whitewater Gorge Trail in Richmond, where it also travels through the Gennett Walk of Fame in Whitewater Gorge Park.

The trail was designated a National Recreation Trail in June 2003, and in 2018 was entered into the Rails-to-Trails Conservancy's "Rail Trail Hall of Fame." The trail is also part of the northern route of the American Discovery Trail.

== Background ==
In 1993, volunteers organized an investigative meeting to study purchasing an abandoned rail line for a rails-to-trails conversion project. Removal of the steel rails began in late 1992. Work started in Marion and was completed from there through Richmond by June 1993. Cardinal Greenway, Inc., a not-for-profit, was formed, purchasing 60 miles (97 km) of the former railroad corridor from CSX Corporation in that same year (1993). In 1996 a Master Plan was completed and final drawings were submitted to INDOT.

Groundbreaking took place in September 1997, marking the start of Phase 1, a 10-mile (16 km) Muncie section from the Wysor Street Depot to County Road 534 East. The 8-mile (13 km) Jonesboro-Marion section and the 2.5-mile (4.0 km) Richmond section were constructed sometime before 2003. The 10-mile (16 km) Muncie-Gaston section was constructed around 2003.

In 2003, the Cardinal Greenway was designated a National Recreation Trail.

The 7-mile (11 km) Losantville-Mt. Pleasant section was opened in a ribbon-cutting ceremony held in Losantville on April 19, 2007. Governor Mitch Daniels helped cut the ribbon.

In 2008 the state governor announced grants which include work on the Richmond-to-Losantville section including the improvement of six bridges and the Sweetser Switch Trail Connector, linking the two trails along a defunct railroad corridor.

The trail is managed by Cardinal Greenway, Inc., formerly known as Delaware Greenways, Inc. The company is organized under federal tax regulations as a 501(c)(3) not-for-profit organization.

== Route ==
See: Cardinal Greenway Map

Cardinal Greenways is a private, not-for-profit organization that encompasses the Cardinal Greenway, White River Greenway, Historic Wysor Street Depot and Cardinal Equestrian Trail.

The Cardinal Greenway is the longest rail-trail in Indiana and spans 62 miles from Marion through Muncie to Richmond in East Central Indiana.

The trail starts in Richmond, travels through Wayne, Randolph, Henry, Delaware, and Grant counties, and ends in the town of Converse at the border between Grant and Miami Counties.

The trail is asphalt paved the entire way.

=== Richmond Section ===
The trail begins with a 2.5 miles (4.0 km) section on the north side of Richmond. This is near the Whitewater River.

This is the curviest segment of the former railroad corridor.

The Cardinal Greenway then travels into the heart of Muncie, bisecting with Wysor Street Depot in the middle. Just to the north of the depot the Cardinal Greenway intersects the White River Greenway.

The trail continues out of Muncie to Gaston. It is about 10 miles (16 km) from the depot to the trailhead in Gaston.

=== Gaston-Jonesboro Gap ===
An 11.3-mile (18.2 km) section of the former rail corridor, going from Gaston to Jonesboro and running through Fowlerton, is owned by private land owners. Cardinal Greenways, Inc. states that a route “will be chosen using public roads to connect the two sections of Cardinal Greenway.” IndianaTrails.org states that “[t]he county road route can be followed using Dan Henry-style pavement markers.”

=== (Jonesboro-) Marion Section ===
This section of the route is 8 miles (13 km) in length.

The trail resumes in Jonesboro at East 10th Street. From there it travels along the Mississinewa River until it crosses US-35/IN-22. By East 4th Street in Jonesboro, there is a pedestrian bridge over the Mississinewa to the Eugene “Beaner” Linn Park, a 90-acre (360,000 m^{2}) park in Gas City.

After crossing US-35/IN-22, the trail goes on into Marion, going by Hogin Park, through the short tunnel under South D Street, under “the bypass” (IN-9), and ending at South Miller Avenue.

=== Beyond Marion ===
Plans were announced on October 16, 2007, to expand the Cardinal Greenway 3 miles (4.8 km) west to the Sweetser Switch Trail in Sweetser, and perhaps eventually to Converse in Miami County. The trail is now (2022) joined to both Sweetser Switch and Converse Junction trail, ending in downtown Converse.

== See also ==
- American Discovery Trail
- Great American Rail-Trail
- List of cycleways in Indiana
- List of rail trails in the United States
