= Huntington station (Amtrak) =

Amtrak station in West Virginia, US

Huntington, WV
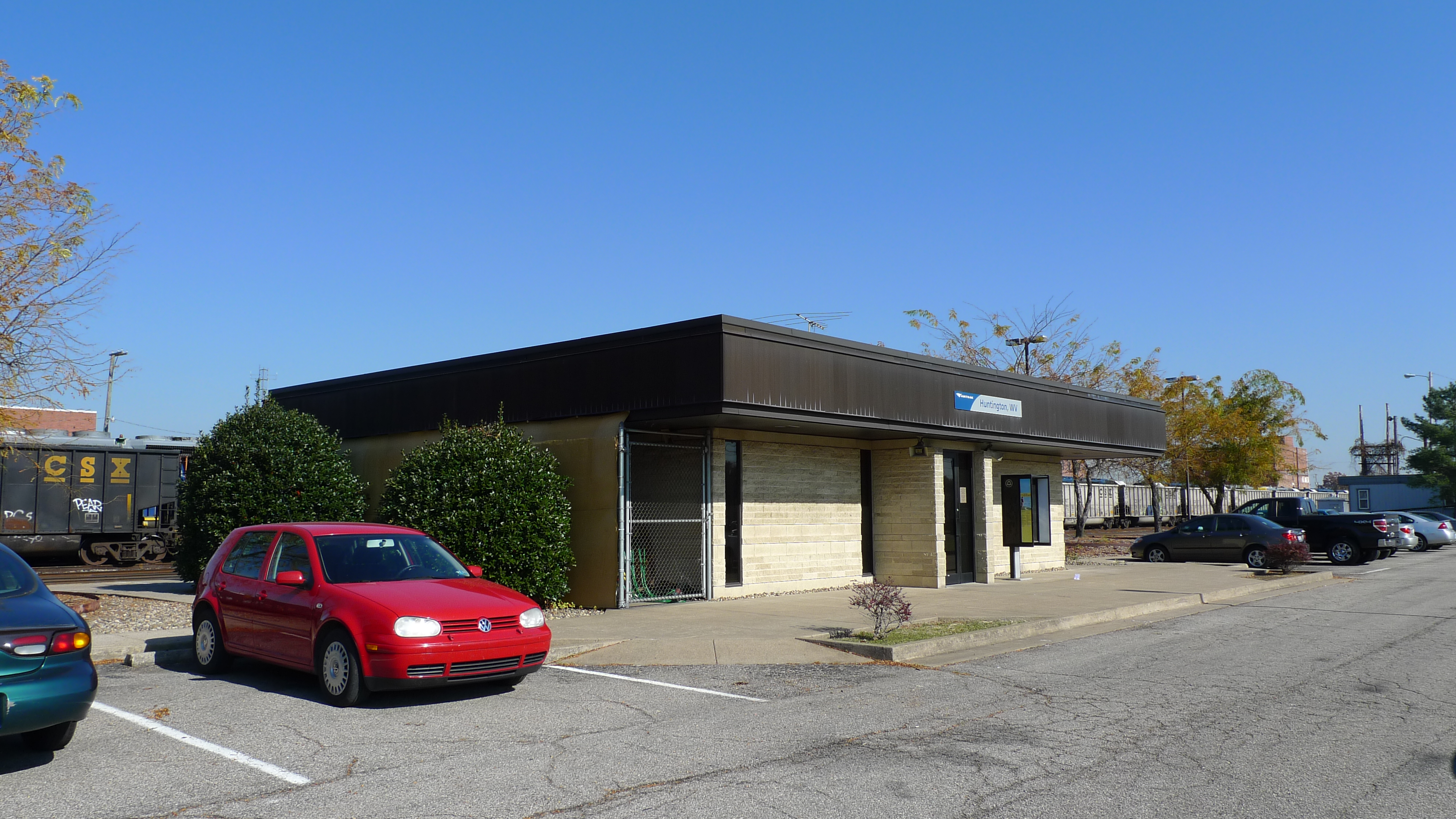
- Huntington station in November 2010

General information
- Location: 1050 8th Avenue; Huntington, West Virginia; United States
- Coordinates: 38.4159°N 82.4397°W
- Owner: CSX Transportation
- Line: CSX Kanawha Subdivision
- Platforms: 1 side platform
- Tracks: 2
- Connections: Tri-State Transit Authority

Construction
- Parking: Yes
- Accessible: yes

Other information
- Station code: Amtrak: HUN

History
- Opened: 1873
- Rebuilt: 1983

Passengers
- FY 2025: 4,490 (Amtrak)

Services
Preceding station	Amtrak	Following station
Ashland toward Chicago	Cardinal	Charleston toward New York
Former services
Preceding station	Amtrak	Following station
Tri-State (Ashland until 1975) toward Chicago	James Whitcomb Riley 1974–1977	Charleston toward Washington, D.C.
Ashland toward Chicago	James Whitcomb Riley and George Washington 1972–1974	Charleston toward Washington, D.C. or Newport News
Ashland toward Cincinnati	James Whitcomb Riley 1971–1972	Charleston toward Washington, D.C. or Newport News
Preceding station	Chesapeake and Ohio Railway	Following station
West Huntington toward Cincinnati	Main Line	Guyandot toward Washington, D.C. or Phoebus
Location

Huntington station is an Amtrak station in Huntington, West Virginia served by the Cardinal route. Located at 1050 8th Avenue, the station consists of a platform on the south side of the east-west tracks, a small parking lot, and a small building containing a waiting room and space for a ticket office, though Amtrak pulled the station agent in the 21st century.

The station replaced a nearby historic Chesapeake and Ohio Railway building that is still in use as offices for its successor CSX Transportation.

== C&O station ==
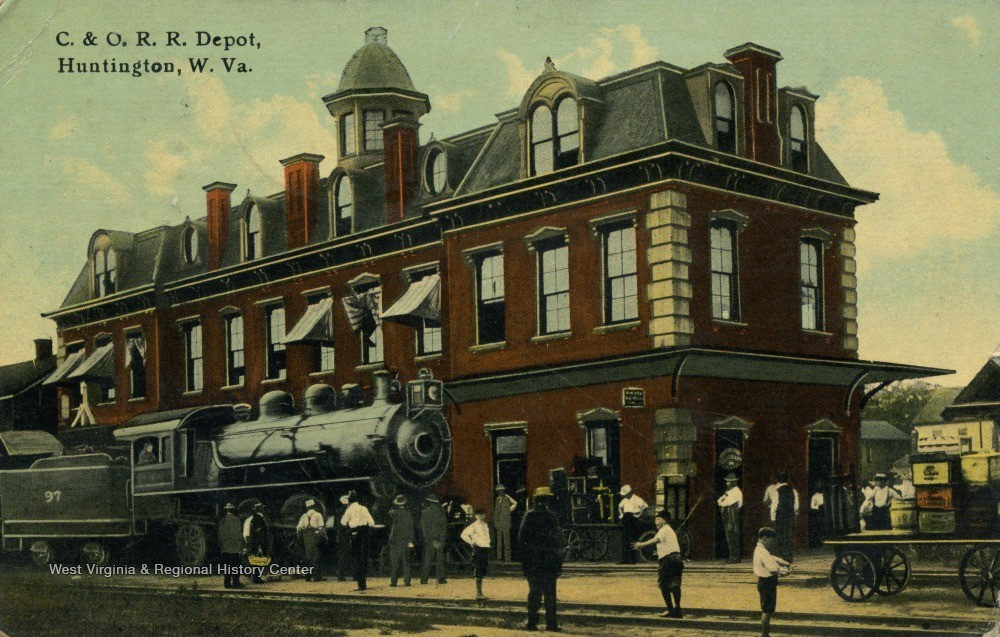
A postcard depicting the 1872 C&O station

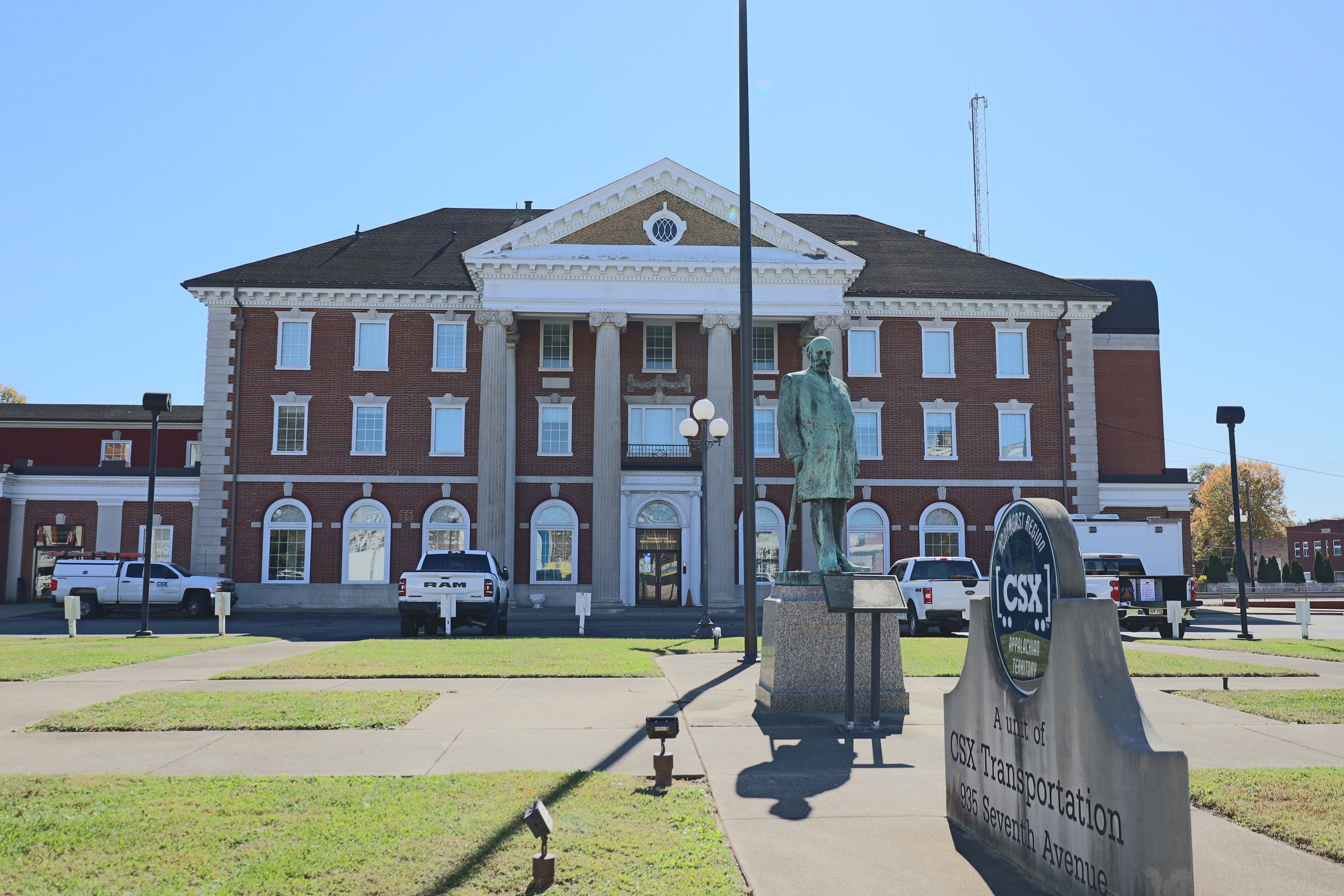
The 1913 C&O station building in 2023

The Chesapeake and Ohio Railway reached its original western terminus in Huntington in 1871. Its first station building, a three-story mansard-roofed building, was completed the following year.

In 1913, the building was replaced by a new three-story 31,000-square-foot Colonial Revival red brick building with an Ionic portico. Around 1924, a statue of Collis Potter Huntington was added that was sculpted by Gutzon Borglum. It ceased to be used for passenger service in April 1971, and was converted to administrative offices for C&O's successor CSX Transportation, serving as the headquarters of one of its ten divisions. It was renovated in 1995. In 2016, CSX disbanded that division and split it between five other divisions, dramatically curtailing the number of employees in the building.

== Amtrak station ==
The Amtrak station replaced the Chesapeake and Ohio station on 7th Avenue, which is still used by CSX. The C&O station hosted daily trains headed northwest, west and east: Fast Flying Virginian (west to Cincinnati, and sections east to Washington, D.C., and Newport News), George Washington (sections west to Cincinnati and Louisville, and sections east to Washington, D.C., and Newport News) and the Sportsman (northwest to Detroit, and sections east to Washington, D.C., and Newport News).

The one story Amtrak building was constructed to a standard design that Amtrak developed in the 1970s and used at locations throughout the country for the next two decades. Typical features included at Huntington are concrete block walls, floor to ceiling windows and a black, cantilevered roof.

== See also ==
- Transportation in Huntington, West Virginia
