= Gary station =

Gary station may refer to one of four railroad stations in Gary, Indiana:

- Gary station (Miller and Lake Streets), a former intercity rail station, closing in 1991
- Gary station (Pennsylvania Railroad), the last intercity rail station in Gary, closing in 1991
- Gary Union Station, the former main intercity railroad station, closed in 1984
- Gary Metro Center, an inter-modal station
