= Maysville station =

Train station in Maysville, Kentucky

Maysville, KY
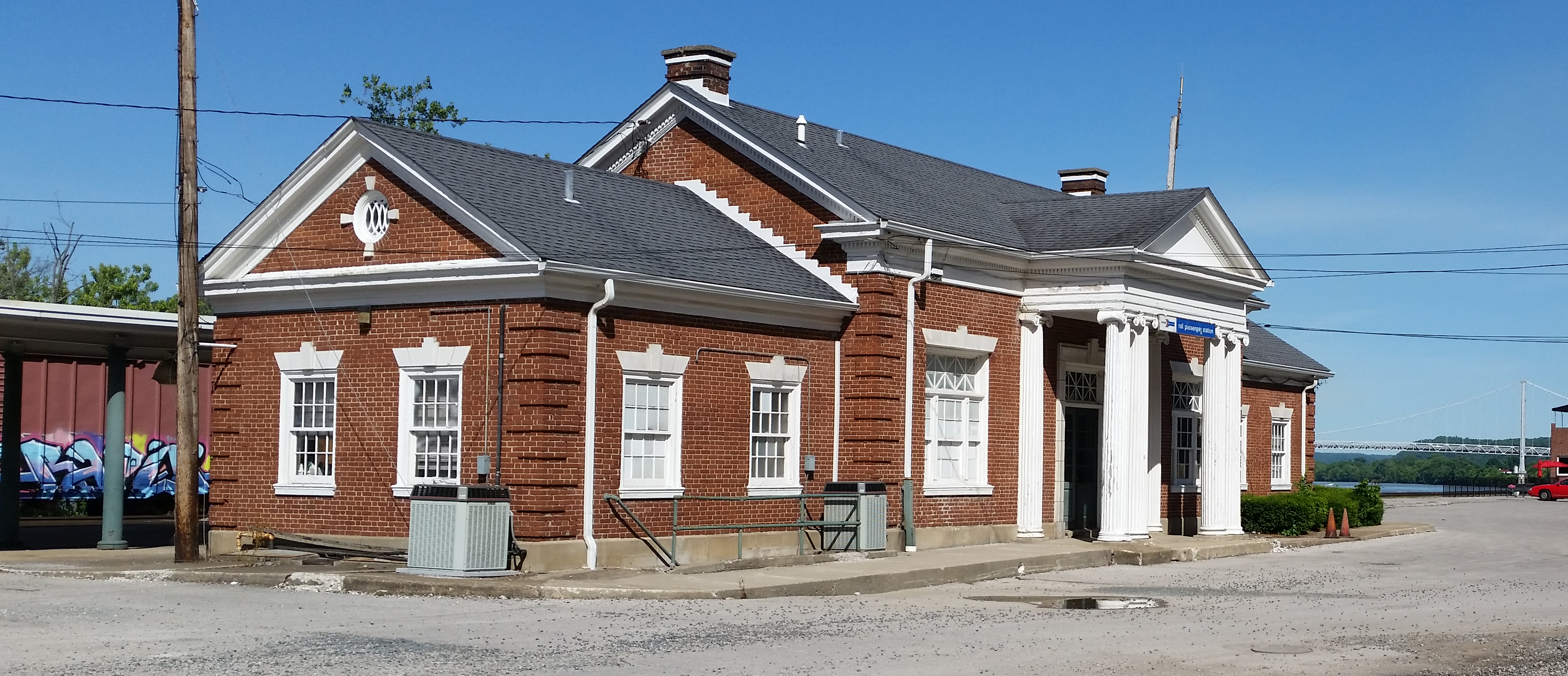
- The station building in 2014 as viewed from the west

General information
- Location: West Front Street & Rosemary Clooney Street; Maysville, Kentucky; United States
- Coordinates: 38.6523°N 83.7710°W
- Line: CSX Cincinnati Subdivision
- Platforms: 1 side platform
- Tracks: 2
- Connections: Maysville City Transit

Other information
- Station code: Amtrak: MAY

History
- Closed: 1968
- Rebuilt: 1918; June 12, 1977

Passengers
- FY 2025: 2,610 (Amtrak)

Services
Preceding station	Amtrak	Following station
Cincinnati toward Chicago	Cardinal	South Portsmouth–South Shore toward New York
Former services
Preceding station	Amtrak	Following station
Cincinnati (River Road) Closed 1991 toward Chicago	Cardinal	South Portsmouth–South Shore toward New York
Cincinnati (River Road) toward Chicago	James Whitcomb Riley 1977	South Portsmouth toward Washington, D.C.
Preceding station	Chesapeake and Ohio Railway	Following station
South Ripley toward Cincinnati	Main Line	Vanceburg toward Washington, D.C. or Phoebus
- Maysville Train Station
- U.S. Historic district – Contributing property
- Part of: West Second Street Historic District (ID100001425)
Location

Maysville station is a train station in Maysville, Kentucky, serving Amtrak, the United States' national passenger rail service. It is a contributing property to the West Second Street Historic District.

It was built around 1918 by the Chesapeake and Ohio Railway in the Georgian style. It stands at the corner of West Front Street and Rosemary Clooney Street. It serves Amtrak's Cardinal trains 50 and 51, and has no station agent or station services. The tracks, once owned by the Chesapeake and Ohio Railway, are owned by CSX Transportation.
