= Henry Daniels =

Henry Daniels may refer to:

- Henry John Daniels (1850–1934), member of the Queensland Legislative Assembly
- Henry H. Daniels (1885–1958), American Episcopal bishop
- Henry Daniels (statistician) (1912–2000), British statistician

== See also ==
- Henry Daniel (disambiguation)
