= Marion station (Pittsburgh, Cincinnati, Chicago and St. Louis Railroad) =

Marion
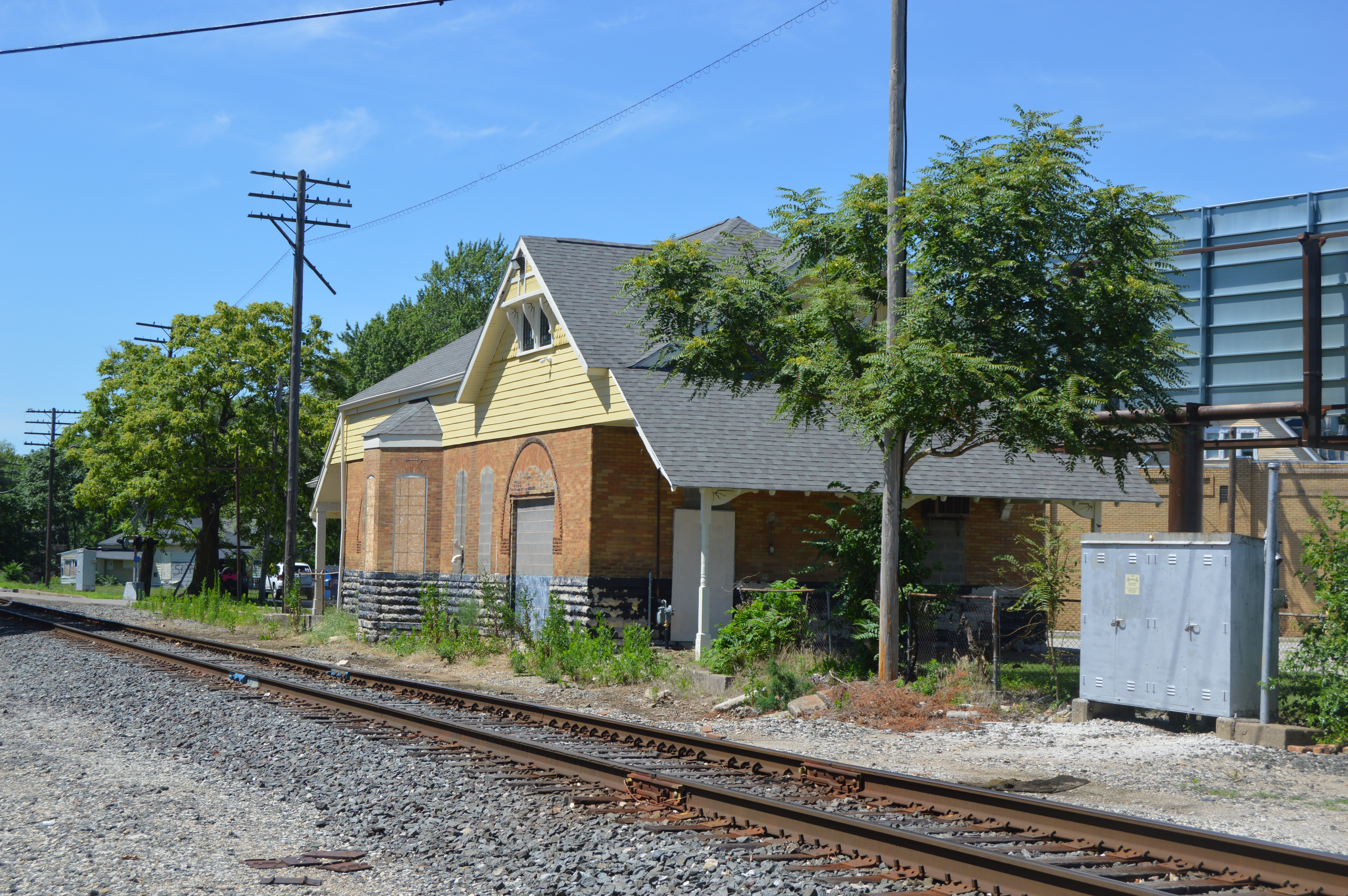

History
- Opened: 1895
- Closed: circa 1955–1960

Former services
Preceding station	Pennsylvania Railroad	Following station
Sweetser toward Chicago	Chicago – Columbus	Gas City toward Columbus
- Marion PCC & St. Louis Railroad Depot
- U.S. National Register of Historic Places
- Location: 1002 S. Washington St. Marion, Indiana
- Coordinates: 40°33′06″N 85°39′37″W
- Built: 1893–1895
- NRHP reference No.: 100002861
- Added to NRHP: September 4, 2018
Location

Marion station is a former Pennsylvania Railroad station in Marion, Indiana.

== History ==
The Pittsburgh, Cincinnati, Chicago and St. Louis Railroad first ran through Marion on October 19, 1867, though passengers were handled from a small depot at McClure and 14th Streets, near the railroad crossing of the Big Four Railroad. Work on the depot's foundations began in 1893. The station was built in 1895, delayed almost two years due to prioritizing construction of Anderson's depot due to a limited-time land deal. The company built a new freight house at 520 Lincoln Boulevard in 1902. Passenger service ended around 1956. It would go on to be converted to a liquor store. The station building was listed on the National Register of Historic Places on September 4, 2018.

== See also ==
- Marion station (Amtrak) — along the Chicago, Cincinnati & Louisville Railroad line
