= Lambert's Point Deperming Station =

Coordinates: 36.8671°N 76.3324°W

Lambert's Point Deperming Station is a United States Navy deperming facility located in the Elizabeth River just off Lambert's Point, Norfolk, Virginia, United States. It was built in the mid-1940s and services the U.S. Atlantic Fleet.

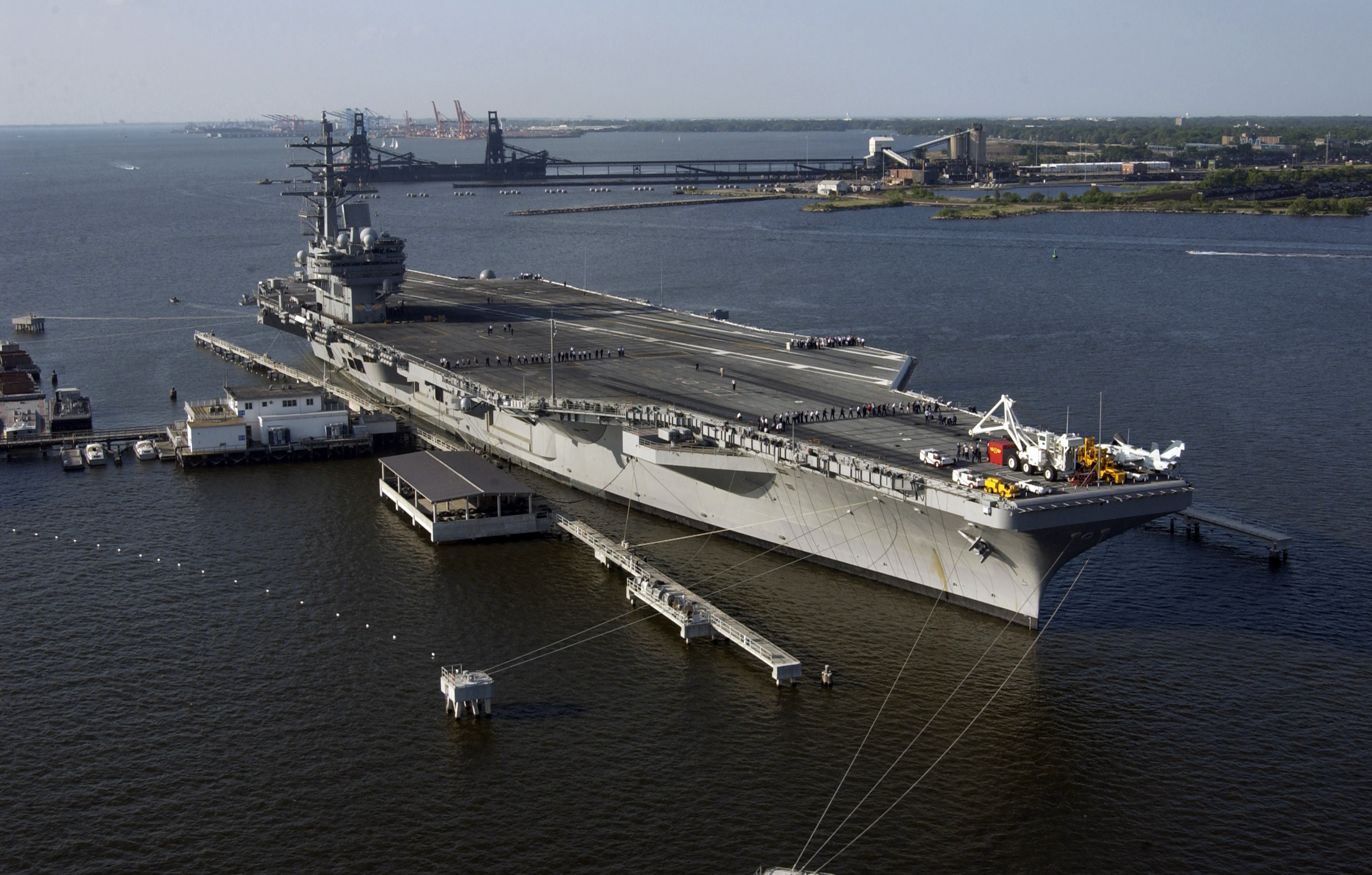
USS Ronald Reagan (CVN 76) prepares for deperming at Naval Station Norfolk Lambert's Point Deperming Station

The station, which is administered by Naval Station Norfolk, consists of two parallel pile-supported piers, roughly 1140 ft. (345 m.) in length, which form a slip that can accommodate all Navy and Coast Guard ships up to and including the largest warships afloat, the Nimitz class aircraft carriers. There is a second pier for smaller vessels and support craft. The station has administrative offices and a medical clinic on site. When viewed from the air, the pier configuration resembles the number 41.
