= Maysville City Transit =

Provider of mass transportation in Mason County, Kentucky

- Headquarters: 1720 Martha Comer Dr.
- Locale: Maysville, Kentucky
- Service area: Mason County, Kentucky
- Service type: Bus service, paratransit
- Routes: 1
- Fleet: 7 buses
- Annual ridership: 27,672 (2019)
- Website: Maysville City Transit

Maysville City Transit is the primary provider of mass transportation in Maysville, Kentucky with one deviated fixed-route serving the region. As of 2019, the system provided 27,672 rides over 3,942 annual vehicle revenue hours with 7 buses.

== History ==
Public transit in Maysville began with mulecars in 1886, with the Maysville Street Railway & Transfer Co. From 1890 to 1892, the mulecars were replaced with streetcars, which in turn were replaced by buses on January 1, 1937. The city of Maysville took over operations of the system in 1960. In 2008, monthly ridership stood at 3,200. The transit system received federal funding to enhance service in 2022 and 2023.

== Service ==
Maysville City Transit operates one deviated fixed-route on a flag down system, allowing riders to board the bus at any street corner. Hours of operation for the system are Monday through Saturday from 6:00 A.M. to 6:00 P.M. and on Sunday from 12:00 P.M. to 6:00 P.M.. Regular fares are $0.25.

== Fixed route ridership ==
The ridership statistics shown here are of fixed route services only and do not include demand response services.

== See also ==
- List of bus transit systems in the United States
- Maysville station
