= Ashland Bus System =

Bus system in Ashland, Kentucky

- Headquarters: 99 15th Street
- Locale: Ashland, KY
- Service type: bus service
- Website: ABS Home

Ashland Bus System (ABS) provides the municipal bus service in the City of Ashland, Kentucky and its nearby suburbs. Unlike many such services, it is operated by the city government itself. Its routes also reach the suburbs, including Ceredo, West Virginia and Kenova, West Virginia. This is a result of a dispute between those twin cities, and the West Virginia and Ohio bus system known as the Tri-State Transit Authority, known as TTA.

All buses center on Ashland Transportation Center, which is also used by the Greyhound system as well as Amtrak.

The service provides interchange between itself and TTA via a TTA bus that travels from Ironton, Ohio across the bridge into Ashland and the Ashland Transportation Center. It however does not interchange with TTA in West Virginia, even though the buses pass within a few blocks of one another.

== Routes ==
The system offers five scheduled bus routes:

- Downtown Loop - serving the Ashland Transportation Center, post office, Ashland Town Center mall, and River Hills Plaza (Melody Mountain) shopping area.
- Crosstown - serving the Ashland Transportation Center, Midtown Shopping Center, South Ashland, and Scope Towers.
- 13th Street - serving the Ashland Transportation Center, Midtown Shopping Center, and several points in Westwood.
- 29th Street - serving the Ashland Transportation Center, King's Daughters Medical Center, Deboard Hill, South Ashland, the YMCA, Ashland Community and Technical College, and Midtown Shopping Center.
- Catlettsburg - serving the Ashland Transportation Center, Scope Towers, downtown Catlettsburg, the Boyd County courthouse complex, Kenova, West Virginia, and downtown Ashland.

== See also ==
- Ashland Transportation Center
- List of bus transit systems in the United States
- Transportation in Huntington, West Virginia
