= Ashland Transportation Center =

Ashland, KY
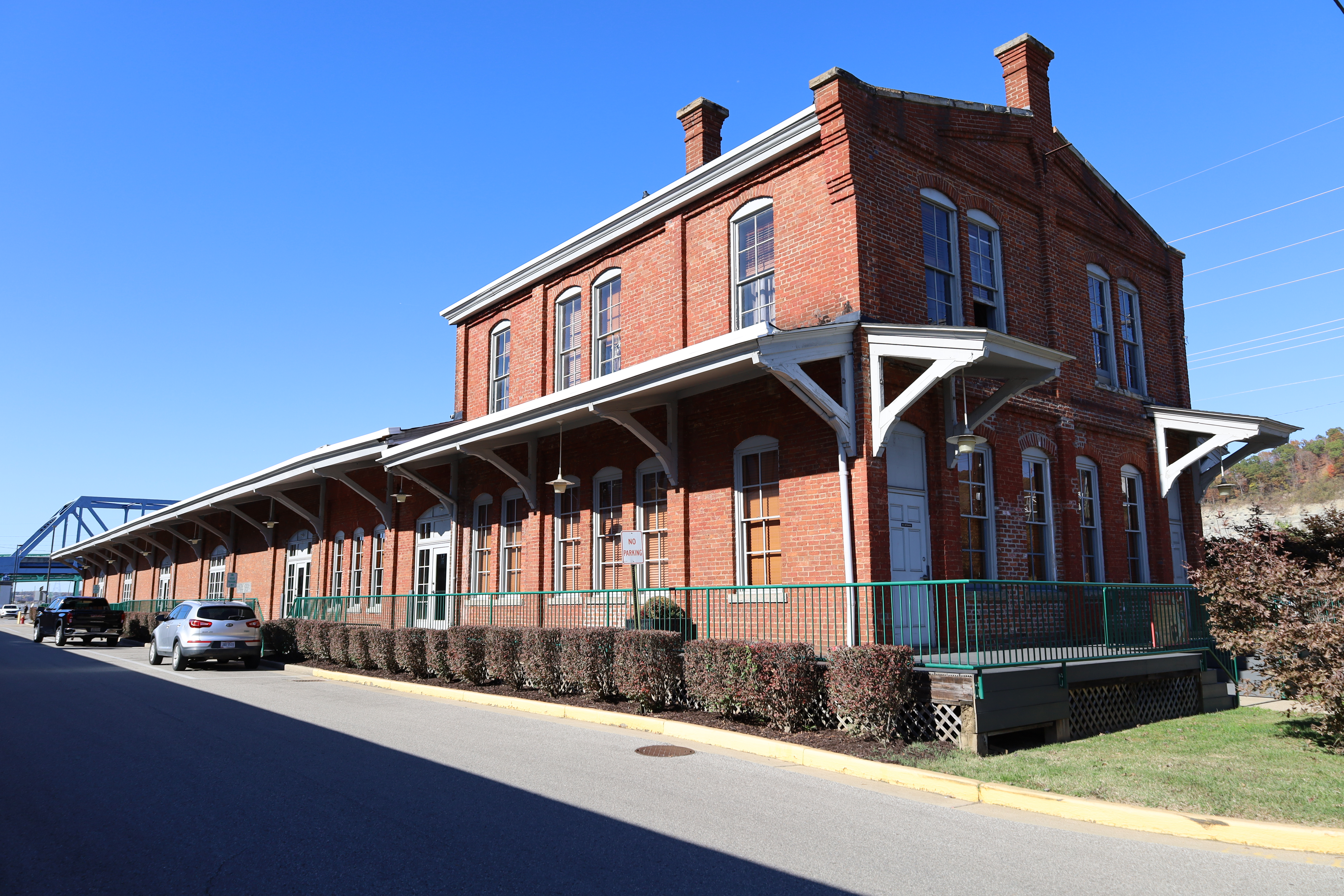
- The station building in 2023

General information
- Location: 99 15th Street; Ashland, Kentucky; United States
- Coordinates: 38°28′51″N 82°38′22″W
- Owner: CSX Transportation & City of Ashland
- Line: CSX Kanawha Subdivision
- Platforms: 1 side platform
- Tracks: 2
- Connections: Ashland Bus System; Greyhound Lines; Mor'Trans; Northeast Kentucky Community Action Agency; Sandy Valley Transportation Services

Construction
- Accessible: Yes

Other information
- Station code: Amtrak: AKY

History
- Opened: March 11, 1998
- Closed: March 24, 1975 (Temporarily to Catlettsburg)

Passengers
- FY 2025: 1,792 (Amtrak)

Services
Preceding station	Amtrak	Following station
South Portsmouth–South Shore toward Chicago	Cardinal	Huntington toward New York
Former services
Preceding station	Amtrak	Following station
Cincinnati (River Road) toward Chicago	James Whitcomb Riley 1974–1975	Huntington toward Washington, D.C.
Cincinnati (River Road) toward Chicago	James Whitcomb Riley and George Washington 1971–1974	Huntington toward Washington, D.C. or Newport News
Preceding station	Chesapeake and Ohio Railway	Following station
Russell toward Cincinnati	Main Line	Catlettsburg toward Washington, D.C. or Phoebus
Terminus	Big Sandy Division	Catlettsburg toward Carver, Hellier or Elkhorn City
Rush toward Louisville	Louisville – Ashland	Terminus
- C&O Railroad Freight Depot
- U.S. Historic district – Contributing property
- Part of: Ashland Commercial Historic District (ID94000838)
- Added to NRHP: August 5, 1994
Location

Ashland Transportation Center is an intermodal transit station in Ashland, Kentucky. Jointly operated by the City of Ashland and CSX Transportation, it currently serves Amtrak's Cardinal train as well as the Ashland Bus System, Greyhound Lines, and regional shuttles. It is located at 99 15th Street near downtown Ashland. The building, a former Chesapeake and Ohio Railway freight house, is listed on the National Register of Historic Places as a contributing property to the Ashland Commercial Historic District.

== History ==
=== Chesapeake and Ohio era ===
The station is located in a former Chesapeake and Ohio Railway freight house originally built in the 1890s. Railway services formerly operated out of the Chesapeake and Ohio passenger station nearby (currently a PNC Bank branch). In the early 1960s the following named trains served the station daily: Fast Flying Virginian (west to Cincinnati, and sections east to Washington, D.C., and Newport News), George Washington (sections west to Cincinnati and Louisville, and sections east to Washington, D.C., and Newport News) and the Sportsman (northwest to Detroit, and sections east to Washington, D.C., and Newport News).

Prior to the 1971 shift of long-distance passenger train services from private companies to Amtrak, the C&O's George Washington had a main section going north to Columbus, Ohio and Detroit, Michigan, a section running west from Ashland to Louisville, and east-bound sections going to Washington, D.C., and Newport News.

=== Amtrak era ===
In 1975, Amtrak abandoned the original station (which served the daily James Whitcomb Riley train) in favor of nearby Tri-State Station in Catlettsburg. The city purchased the former freight house in 1997 using more than $500,000 in federal funds obtained through the Intermodal Surface Transportation Enhancement Act of 1991 in order to restore it as an intermodal transit station serving rail as well as buses. Amtrak moved rail services to the restored facility on March 11, 1998.

The station is jointly owned by the City of Ashland and CSX Transportation and is operated in co-operation with the city, Amtrak, Greyhound Lines and the Ashland Bus System. The station has an enclosed waiting area with restrooms and water fountains, but no Amtrak station services area available. There is a Greyhound ticket agent available at specified times. The station serves Amtrak's Cardinal, trains 50 and 51. The tracks at the station are currently owned by CSX Transportation.

Mor'Trans, Sandy Valley Transportation Services and Northeast Kentucky Community Action Agency provide connections to Ashland from surrounding counties.
