= Harry Daniel (disambiguation) =

Harry Daniel was an Australian rules footballer.

Harry Daniel may also refer to:

- Harry Daniel, protagonist of the film The Panman: Rhythm of the Palms
- Harry Daniel (1887–1958), Worshipful Master of the Acacia Lodge, buried in The British Cemetery Montevideo

== See also ==
- Henry Daniel (disambiguation)
- Harold Daniell (1909–1967), motorcycle racer
- Harry Daniels (1884–1953), VC recipient
