= Gary station (Miller and Lake Streets) =

Railway station in Gary, Indiana, United States

Gary, IN
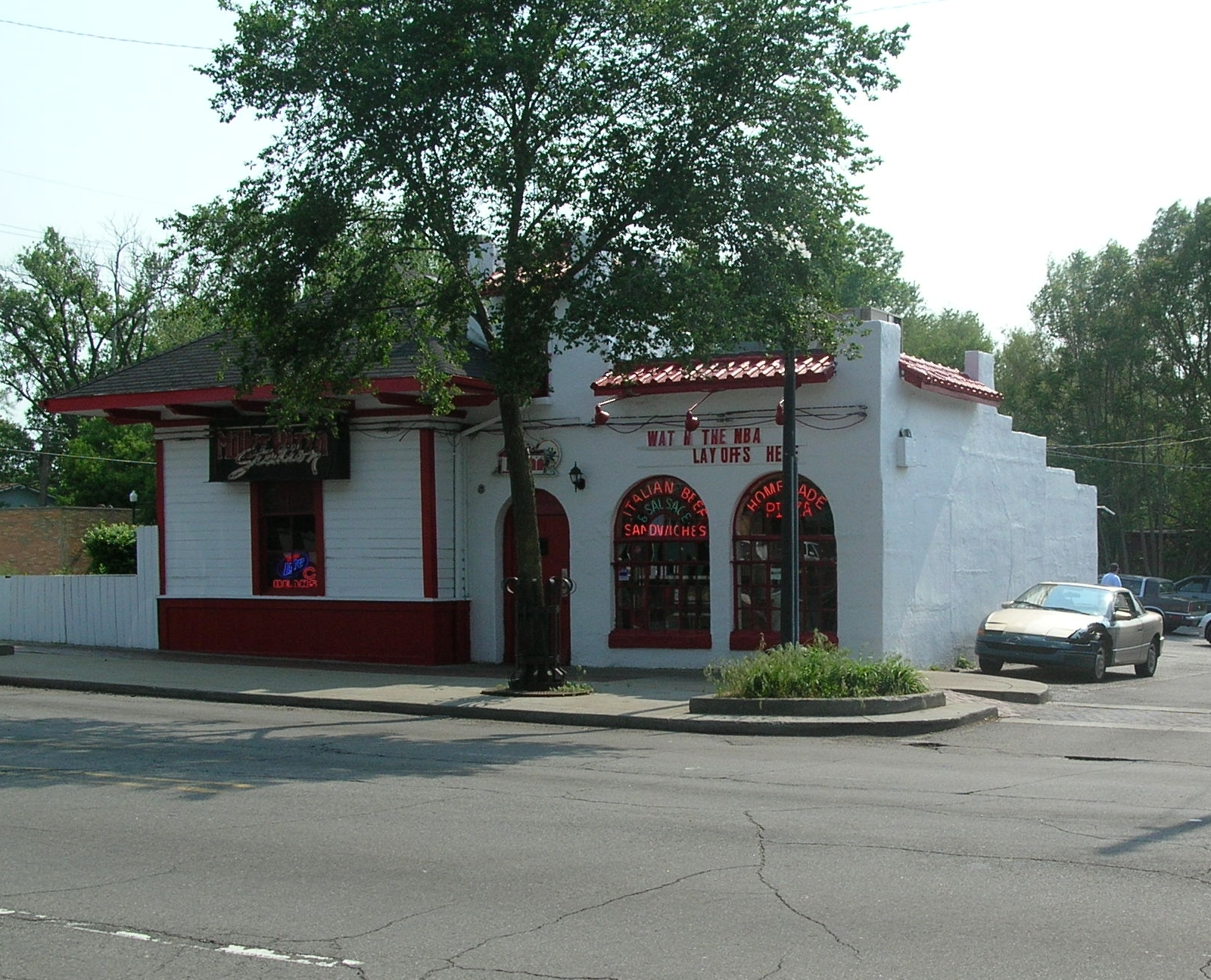
- The original Miller depot, converted to Miller Pizza Station

General information
- Location: Lake Street; Gary, Indiana
- Coordinates: 41.5994°N 87.2672°W

History
- Opened: 1982 (Amtrak)
- Closed: April 26, 1986 (Amtrak)
- Rebuilt: 1910
- Previous names: Millers Station, Millers, Miller
- Original company: Baltimore and Ohio Railroad

Former services
Preceding station	Amtrak	Following station
Chicago Terminus	Cardinal	Peru toward New York
Preceding station	Baltimore and Ohio Railroad	Following station
Gary toward Chicago	Main Line	Nappanee toward Jersey City
Gary toward Chicago	Main Line	Willow Creek toward Jersey City
Location

Gary, formerly Miller, was a train station in the Miller Beach neighborhood of Gary, Indiana.

== History ==
The station site was established when the Baltimore and Ohio Railroad arrived here in 1874. It was referred to as Millers or Miller after the original settlement. The railroad's main passenger station in the area was Gary Union Station. The station building was constructed in 1910.

Amtrak began stopping trains here in 1982 when the Cardinal was reactivated. The Cardinal was rerouted through Indianapolis on April 27, 1986, ending service to the station. Gary would continue see Amtrak service via the daily Calumet at the train station at 5th and Chase until 1991.

== Location ==
The station was 0.2 miles (0.32 km) north of the South Shore Line Miller station.
