= Catlettsburg station =

Former railway station in Kentucky, US

Catlettsburg, KY
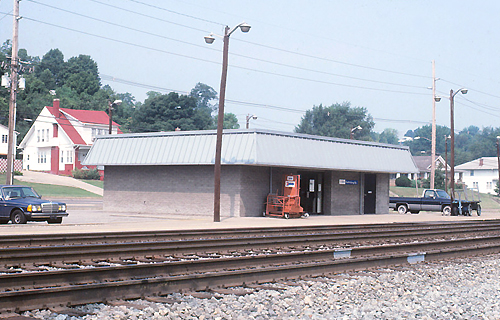
- Tri-State Station (later Catlettsburg) in 1987

General information
- Location: Winchester Avenue at 10th Street; Catlettsburg, Kentucky
- Coordinates: 38°26′3.57″N 82°36′21.69″W
- Tracks: 2

Other information
- Station code: CAT

History
- Opened: March 24, 1975
- Closed: March 11, 1998
- Former names: Tri-State Station (1975–1988)
Former services
Preceding station	Amtrak	Following station
South Portsmouth toward Chicago	Cardinal 1977–1998	Huntington toward New York
Terminus	Hilltopper 1977–1979	Williamson toward Boston South
South Portsmouth toward Chicago	James Whitcomb Riley 1975–1977	Huntington toward Washington, D.C.
South Portsmouth toward Chicago	Mountaineer 1975–1977	Williamson toward Norfolk
Preceding station	Chesapeake and Ohio Railway	Following station
Ashland toward Cincinnati	Main Line	Kenova toward Washington, D.C. or Phoebus
Ashland Terminus	Big Sandy Division	Louisa toward Carver, Hellier or Elkhorn City
- Chesapeake and Ohio Depot
- U.S. National Register of Historic Places
- Location: 26th Street at Panola Street; Catlettsburg, Kentucky
- Coordinates: 38°25′1.29″N 82°35′57.37″W
- NRHP reference No.: 12000446
- Added to NRHP: August 6, 2012
Location

Catlettsburg has two former rail stations. The first was a Chesapeake and Ohio Railway station located in downtown Catlettsburg, Kentucky. Opened between 1897 and 1890 to replace an older wooden station, it served trains until 1958. The C&O station was refurbished from 2004 to 2006 and added to the National Register of Historic Places in 2012.

Amtrak trains began stopping at Tri-State Station some 1.5 miles (2.4 km) to the north in 1975; it was renamed Catlettsburg around 1988. Amtrak service was moved from Catlettsburg to Ashland in 1998.

== C&O station ==
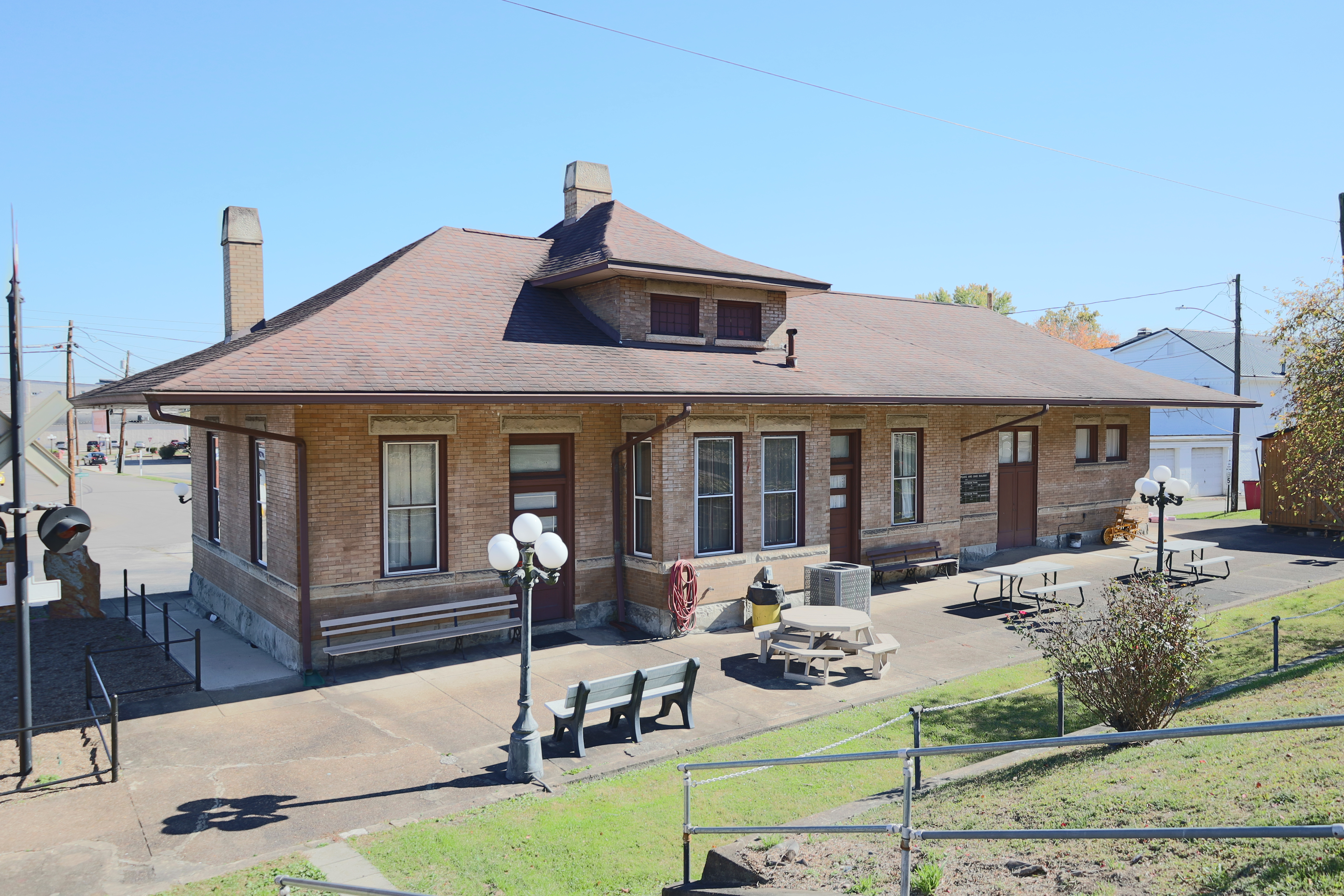
The former station in 2023

The Chattaroi Railroad opened through Catlettsburg in 1880, with a wooden station built to serve the town. The Chesapeake and Ohio Railway (C&O) soon bought the line. Between 1897 and 1900, the C&O constructed a new brick station; the 1880 station was converted for use as a freight house.

The last C&O trains on the "Big Sandy" ran in 1958, ending passenger service to Catlettsburg, although some intercity trains continued to pass. A clause in the original deed required the property to revert to the heirs of its original owners; the heirs declined, and the property was instead transferred to the city. The freight house burned in 1964.

The city used the C&O Catlettsburg station building as a youth center and women's club for a number of years. By 2004 it was in poor condition; a volunteer group restored the building in 2005 and 2006. A historic caboose was acquired and restored next to the station in 2010. The station is used as a visitor center during the city's annual Labor Day festivities, which attract some 10,000 tourists. The station was added to the National Register of Historic Places on August 6, 2012.

== Amtrak station ==
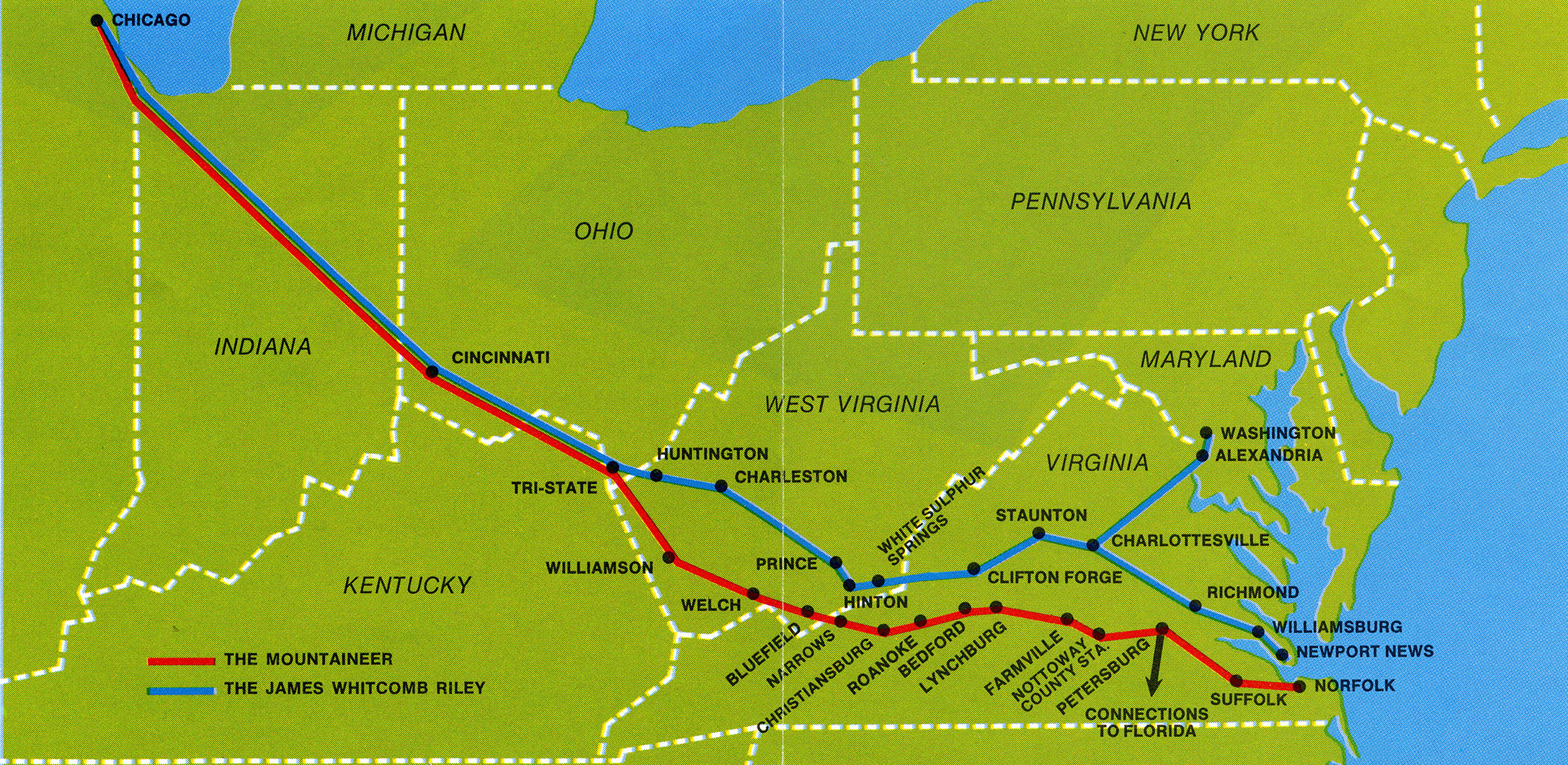
1975 map of the James Whitcomb Riley and the Mountaineer showing their split at Tri-State Station

Amtrak took over intercity passenger service in 1971. The James Whitcomb Riley passed through Catlettsburg, stopping at nearby Ashland and Huntington but not Catlettsburg. On July 31, 1974, it was announced that a new station would be constructed at Catlettsburg to allow trains to bypass downtown Ashland. The new system would be jointly funded by Amtrak and the Chesapeake and Ohio.

On March 24, 1975, Amtrak abandoned Ashland station and began serving Tri-State Station, located between Catlettsburg and Ashland and named for the three-state area it served. The James Whitcomb Riley was supplemented by the simultaneous addition of the Mountaineer service between Norfolk and Chicago, which ran combined with the James Whitcomb Riley west of Ashland.

The Mountaineer was replaced by the Hilltopper, whose western terminus was at Tri-State Station, on June 1, 1977. Although the James Whitcomb Riley continued to serve stations west of Catlettsburg, the two trains arrived at Tri-State Station hours apart, effectively eliminating connections between the two halves of the Mountaineer's former route.

The James Whitcomb Riley was renamed as the Cardinal later that year; the Hilltopper was discontinued on October 1, 1979, leaving just the Cardinal to serve the station. Around 1988, the station was renamed Catlettsburg. The Cardinal was briefly discontinued September 30, 1981. The train was brought back by Congressional mandate on January 8, 1982. When the train was returned it was cut from seven days a week to three days a week.

The Cardinal served the station until Ashland Transportation Center opened on March 11, 1998. The Tri-State Station building was demolished in late 2018/early 2019 as it is no longer visible on Google Street Views as of Sept 2019.
