= Henry Daniel (friar) =

Henry Daniel (fl. 1379) was a Dominican friar and author of widely circulating medieval medical and scientific treatises. He is credited with introducing important Latin medical terms and concepts into Middle English.

== Work ==
Three of Daniel's Middle English works survive today: the Liber Uricrisiarum, a text on uroscopy; the Aaron Danielis, a herbal; and a short tract on rosemary, which was incorporated into the Aaron Danielis but also circulated independently. These Middle English texts compile and translate information from various medieval Latin medical, pharmacological, and botanical texts. Daniel's work made this information accessible to a wider readership than trained medical scholars and physicians.

Daniel's first major work, his Liber Uricrisiarum, tells readers how to diagnose illnesses by uroscopy, the analysis of a patient's urine. The text contains uroscopic knowledge from Greek, Arabic, and Latin medical traditions. Its main sources include Theophilos Protospatharios's Peri ouron (ca. 7th century), Isaac Israeli's De urinis (9th century), and Giles of Corbeil's verse treatise, the Carmen de urinis (late 12th century). In addition to its uroscopic content, Daniel's Liber Uricrisiarum includes medieval scientific knowledge about astronomy, anatomy, embryology, and more. There are two main versions of this text, a shorter "alpha" version and an expanded "beta" version. In total, more than 35 manuscripts of the Liber Uricrisiarum and its adaptations exist today, including one Latin version.

Daniel's second major work, his Aaron Danielis, is an encyclopedia of herbs, other medicinal substances, and select medical terms. As a book of remedies, it serves as "a companion volume" to the Liber Uricrisiarum. It survives in two significantly different manuscript copies in the British Library, MSS Additional 27329 and Arundel 42. The latter manuscript is incomplete. The text describes the nature and medicinal uses of plants, gums, metals, and fungi, and defines a number of unfamiliar medical terms. The Additional manuscript was once part of the library of the noted antiquary Dr. Cox Macro and is also mentioned by Richard Pulteney in his Historical and Biographical sketches of the progress of botany in England, from its origin to the introduction of the Linnaean system.

The short treatise on rosemary survives as a stand-alone work in over 20 manuscripts, as well as being inserted into the rosemary entry of the Aaron Danielis.

== Life ==
Daniel never received formal medical training. Because of his familiarity with academic medical texts in Latin and his knowledge of such works as Aristotle's Metaphysics, it is likely that he received at least some university education. Daniel claims to have traveled for seven years in his youth to learn about herbs, and to have kept a garden in Stepney with 252 different kinds of plants, an unusually large variety of plants for his era. By the time he wrote his Liber Uricrisiarum and Aaron Danielis he was an aging friar at a Dominican convent.

== Editions ==
- E. Ruth Harvey, M. Teresa Tavormina and Sarah Star. Liber Urucrisiarum: A Reading Edition. University of Toronto Press, 2020. (online)

== Notes ==
This article incorporates text from a publication now in the public domain: "Daniel, Henry". Dictionary of National Biography. London: Smith, Elder & Co. 1885–1900.
