= Dan Henry =

Inventor of directional pavement markings

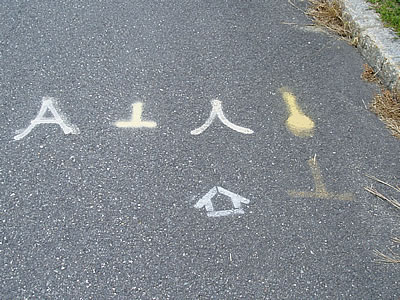
An example "Dan Henrys" for six different routes. All indicate the same direction of travel.

Dan Henry (1913–2012) is the inventor of directional pavement markings commonly used to guide participants along the route of organized bicycling events. The markers themselves are usually called Dan Henry Arrows.

Originally, the markings consisted of a circle with a vertical line from the edge of the circle pointing in the direction of travel (straight ahead, left turn, right turn). Other common markings are a circle X to denote wrong way, and a circled horizontal line to denote caution.

Variations on the circle pattern developed to differentiate between different rides as more and more rides began to use the same roads. Variations include color, triangles, squares, letters, etc.

Other cycling related inventions by Henry include front and rear suspension systems and the 'sling' saddle.

Henry worked as a commercial pilot, starting in the 1920s, later on DC-2 and DC-3 aircraft and the Boeing 707 jetliner.

== Honors ==
The League of American Wheelmen awarded Henry its Paul Dudley White Medal in 1992 and a bike route in the Santa Ynez Valley has been named for him.
