= Mountaineer (Amtrak train) =

Former Amtrak passenger train in the eastern US

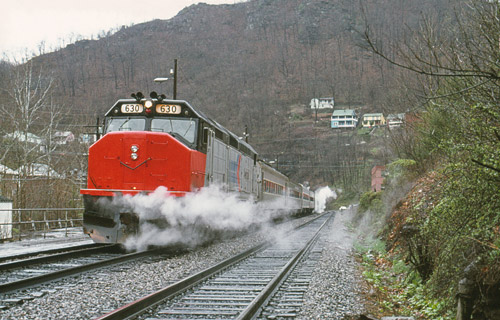
- The Mountaineer at Welch, West Virginia in March 1975

Overview
- Service type: Inter-city rail
- Status: Discontinued
- Locale: West Virginia
- Predecessor: Pocahontas
- First service: March 24, 1975
- Last service: May 31, 1977
- Successor: Hilltopper
- Former operator: Amtrak
- Ridership: 53,400 (1977)

Route
- Termini: Norfolk, Virginia; Chicago, Illinois
- Stops: 18
- Distance travelled: 968 miles (1,558 km)
- Average journey time: 24 hours 40 minutes
- Service frequency: Daily
- Train number: 54,55

On-board services
- Classes: Coach; Sleeper
- Sleeping arrangements: Roomettes and bedrooms
- Catering facilities: Grill diner
- Observation facilities: Dome coach
- Baggage facilities: Checked

Technical
- Track gauge: 4 ft 8 1/2 in (1,435 mm)
- Track owner: Norfolk and Western Railway

The Mountaineer was a passenger train operated by Amtrak between Norfolk, Virginia, and Chicago, Illinois, via Cincinnati, Ohio. It was the first train to use the Norfolk and Western Railway's tracks since the creation of Amtrak in 1971 and followed the route of the Pocahontas, the N&W's last passenger train. Service began in 1975 and ended in 1977. A new train, the Hilltopper, operated over much of the Mountaineer's route but was itself discontinued in 1979.

== History ==
The Norfolk and Western Railway was one of the twenty railroads which joined Amtrak in 1971. However, in Amtrak's first four years, the N&W hosted no passenger service over its route, the centerpiece of which was its main line between Norfolk and Cincinnati which passed through the state of West Virginia. The main driving force behind the establishment of the Mountaineer was then-United States Senator Robert Byrd of West Virginia who wanted additional rail service for his constituents and pressured the Department of Transportation to add the route.

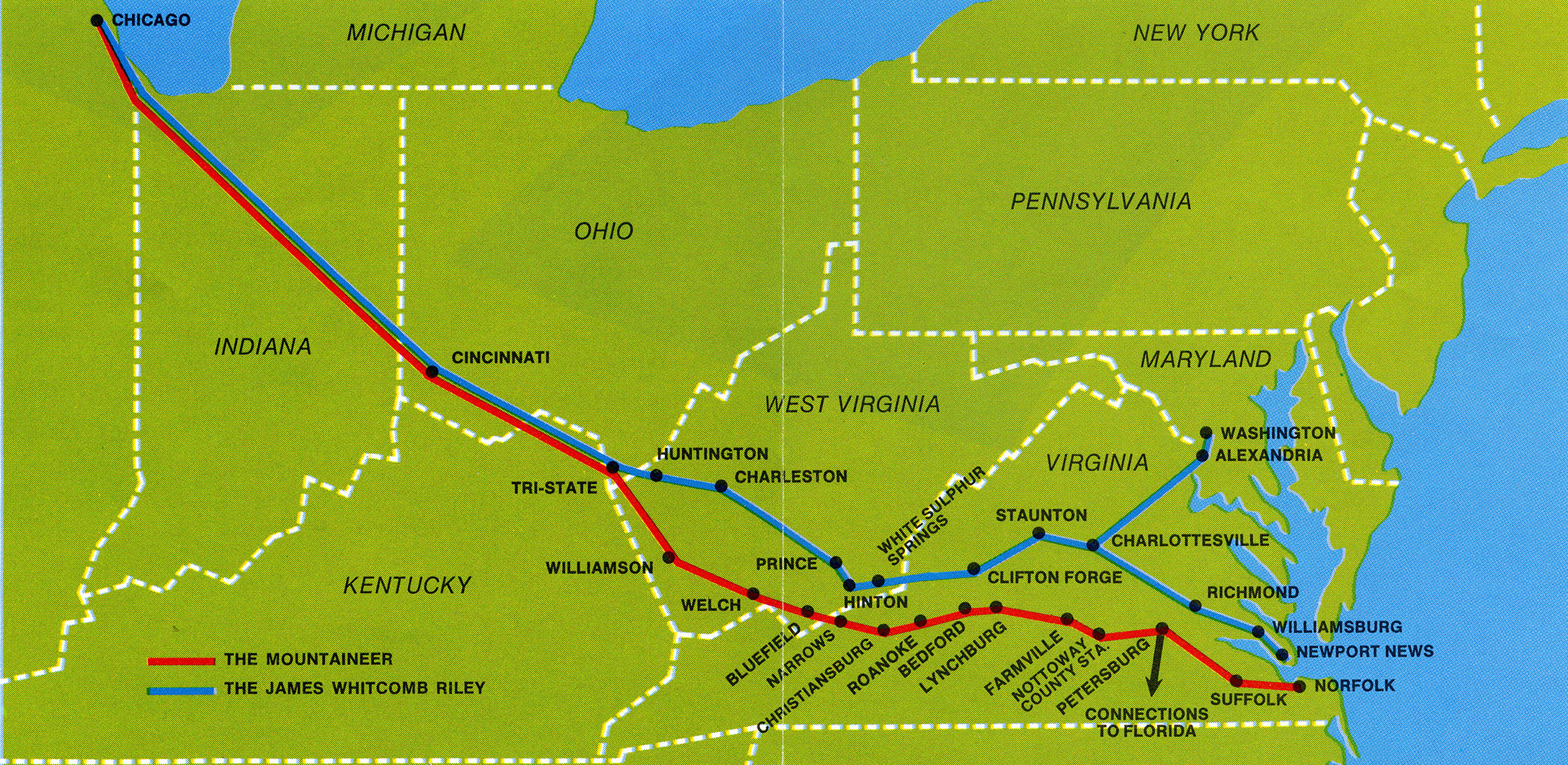
1975 map of the James Whitcomb Riley and the Mountaineer

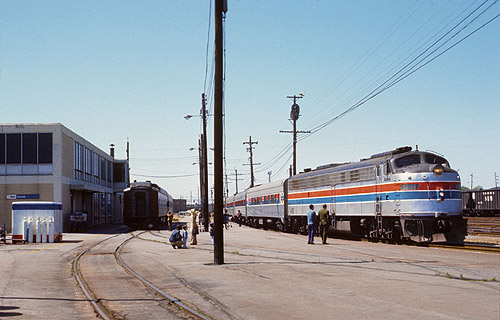
The Mountaineer at Lambert's Point Station in Norfolk in April 1976

The Mountaineer operated as a section of the Chicago–Washington/Newport News James Whitcomb Riley between Chicago and Cincinnati. The two trains separated at a Chesapeake & Ohio Railway (C&O) yard in Ashland, Kentucky, with the Riley continuing to Washington and Newport News, while the Mountaineer continued to Catlettsburg, Kentucky and points east roughly twenty-five minutes behind the Riley. Westbound the procedure was reversed.

The first trains ran on March 24, 1975, marking the return of rail passenger service to the Norfolk & Western. Amtrak guaranteed two years of operation, while warning that the train would "habitually lose money." Amtrak president Paul Reistrup projected costs of $4.5 million/year while taking in $900,000 in the first year. To make the run viable the Mountaineer would need to carry 150–300 people daily between Norfolk and Cincinnati.

In 1976 Amtrak announced several possible changes to the Mountaineer, including a later schedule through West Virginia and combined operation west of Cincinnati with both the Riley and an unnamed (and never implemented) Washington–Denver train. Under this plan the Mountaineer would receive new Amfleet equipment but lose its sleeping car. The schedule changes never took place, but Amtrak was forced to re-equip the Mountaineer after a harsh winter damaged many of its old steam-heated coaches and locomotives. The Mountaineer was one of eight routes suspended in January 1977. It returned in February 1977 with an all-Amfleet consist, minus the sleeping car.

Ridership on the Mountaineer over its two-year probationary period was disappointing: 58,991 in 1975 and 53,400 in 1976. Averaged over a 365-day year, this was 161 passengers per day in 1975 and 146 in 1976. By 1977 daily ridership had dwindled to 35. Monetary losses were far higher than expected: $5.7 million in FY1975 and $14.9 million in FY1976. After a brief respite, Amtrak discontinued the Mountaineer on May 31, 1977. A new train, the Hilltopper, operated over much of the same route until 1979.

== Stations ==
None of the fourteen stations east of Cincinnati had seen Amtrak service before. Tri-State Station (named for the states of Kentucky, Ohio and West Virginia) in Catlettsburg, Kentucky, replaced an existing stop at Ashland. Amtrak built new stations at Roanoke and Bluefield. The remaining stops all used existing Norfolk & Western stations, with varying degrees of refurbishment and renovation. Two cities, Petersburg and Lynchburg, Virginia, had additional rail service at different stations. Amtrak's Florida-bound trains used the ex-Atlantic Coast Line Railroad Petersburg station, while the Southern Railway's remaining trains used Kemper Street station in Lynchburg.

== Equipment ==
The Mountaineer's typical consist (at first) was five cars: a baggage-dormitory, two coaches, a grill diner and a 10-roomette 6-bedroom (10-6) sleeping car. When available, one of the coaches was a dome car. Starting in January 1977 Amtrak ran a consist of three new Amfleet cars, typically two coaches and a cafe.
