= Lambert's Point =

Point on the shore of the Elizabeth River

Coordinates: 36.87468°N 76.32348°W

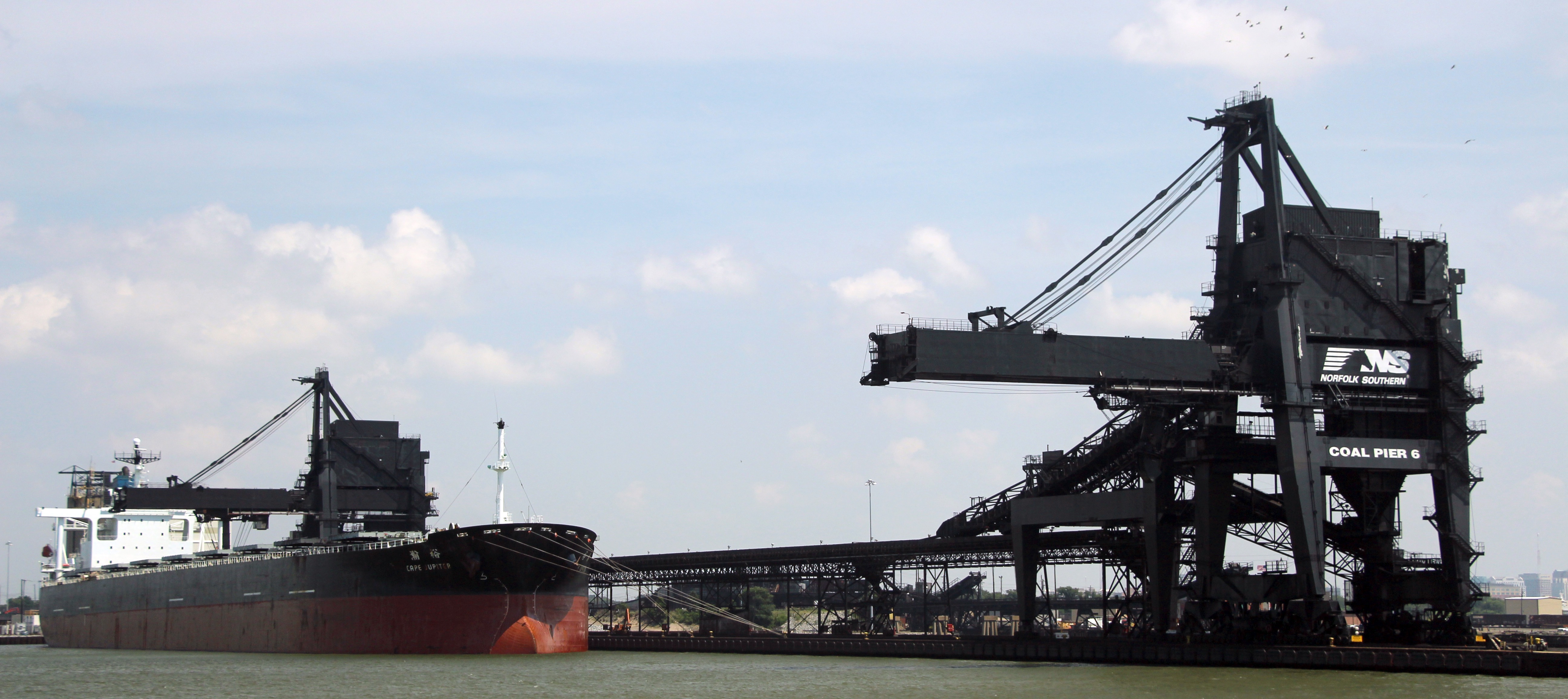
Lambert's Point pier

Lambert's Point is a point of land on the east shore of the Elizabeth River near the downtown area of the independent city of Norfolk in the South Hampton Roads region of eastern Virginia, United States. It includes a large coal exporting facility and a residential area. The area is south of Old Dominion University.

== History ==
Lambert's Point was named for Thomas Lambert, who patented 100 acres (400,000 m^{2}) there on the east side of the bay of the Elizabeth River on June 1, 1635, when the territory was still a part of Elizabeth River Shire in colonial Virginia. Lambert was an ensign in the Lower Norfolk County Militia by 1640 and was later a major in the same outfit. He was subsequently a member of the Assembly at Jamestown for Lower Norfolk County in 1652, and by the time of his death in 1671 he was the proud bearer of the title Lieutenant Colonel Thomas Lambert. Lambert's Point was located in Norfolk County when that county was formed from Lower Norfolk County in 1691.

The Norfolk and Petersburg Railroad (N&P) was built under the oversight of William Mahone, young civil engineer from Southampton County, Virginia who had been educated in the first graduating class of Virginia Military Institute (VMI). A rail link to the west had long been a dream of Norfolk citizens led by Dr. Francis Mallory. Despite delays, financial constraints, and the Yellow Fever Epidemic of 1855, by 1858, young Mahone and his N&P workforce had bridged both the Eastern and Southern Branches of the Elizabeth River, deployed a corduroy roadbed across the northern portion of the Great Dismal Swamp and completed the line west to Petersburg. At the Cockade City, connections could be made with a north-south railroad to Richmond or North Carolina, as well as more importantly, the South Side Railroad to Lynchburg which itself connected with the Virginia and Tennessee Railroad (V&T). Eventually, a rail link all the way to the Mississippi River and the Gulf of Mexico at New Orleans was thus seen as possible.

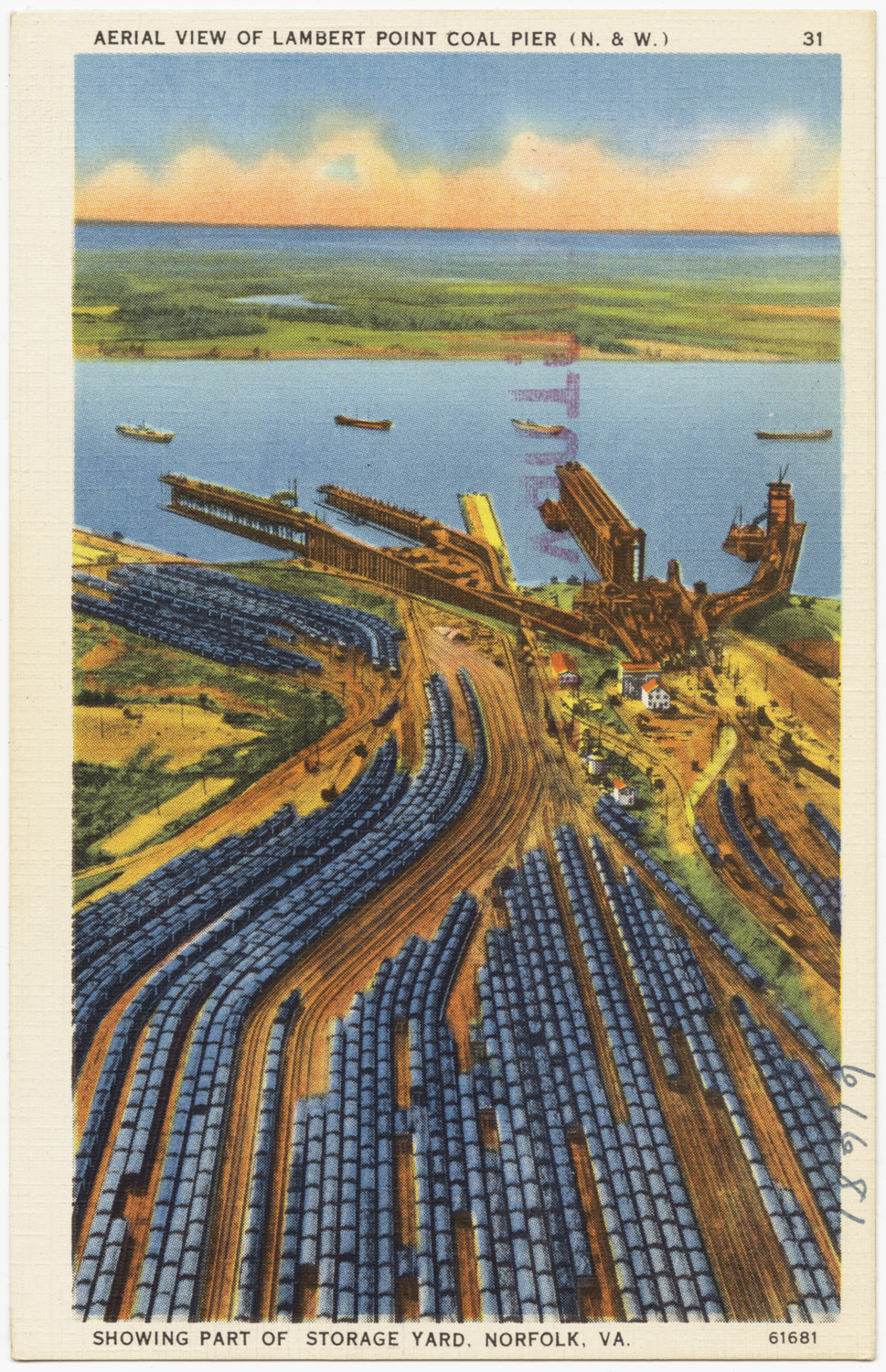
Tichnor Brothers linen-era postcard (1930–1945) aerial view of Lambert's Point Coal Pier

Things were looking very favorable for both Norfolk and the new enterprise when operations were completely disrupted by the American Civil War, which was to last five years and do great damage to the railroads. Although the Confederacy lost the war, Mahone emerged as the so-called hero of the Battle of the Crater. He promptly set about leading the efforts to rebuild the N&P and its connecting railroads, funded with money from British bondholders. By 1870, he controlled all three, renamed jointly as the Atlantic, Mississippi and Ohio Railroad (AM&O). There is ample evidence that Mahone had become aware of the potential wealth represented by untapped bituminous coal reserves in southern West Virginia, and had planned a fourth railroad and acquired land to capitalize upon them. However, the Financial Panic of 1873 forced the AM&O into defaulting on its bonds and delaying any thoughts of expansion. After several years of receivership, the bondholders lost confidence in Mahone and he lost control of the AM&O. It operated under receivership for a number of years and Mahone struggled to obtain adequate financing to regain control. Finally, in 1881, it was sold at auction, but Mahone was outbid. Instead, Philadelphia interests won and renamed as the Norfolk and Western Railway (N&W). (Mahone went on to a career in Virginia and national politics and saw to it that some of the proceeds from the sale of the state's portion of the investment in what had been "his" railroad went to build a school for blacks which ultimately became Virginia State University (VSU), near Petersburg).

The new Philadelphia owners were also keenly aware of the opportunities represented by southern West Virginia coal, where they owned much land. Soon, under the leadership of Frederick J. Kimball, they set about extending their lines west from the New River Valley to reach them. The first carload of coal arrived in Norfolk and Western's Eastern Branch Terminal in 1883. Many more were to follow, and soon it was apparent that a larger facility for loading the coal onto ships would be needed. Land was acquired in Norfolk County just outside the City of Norfolk on the harbor. Facilities were developed there, and the first of many coal piers to come opened at Lambert's Point in 1886. The N&W tracks were extended directly to the new coal piers at Lambert's Point upon their completion. A residential section was also developed to house the families of the workers. Many early residents of Lambert's Point were involved in the coal industry. By 1900, Norfolk was the leading coal exporting port on the East Coast. The area including Lambert's Point was annexed by the city of Norfolk in 1911.

Norfolk and Western expanded greatly, and in the 1980s, the Class 1 railroad became part of Norfolk Southern Corporation, a Fortune 500 Company headquartered in Norfolk. The headquarters moved to Atlanta, Georgia, in 2018.

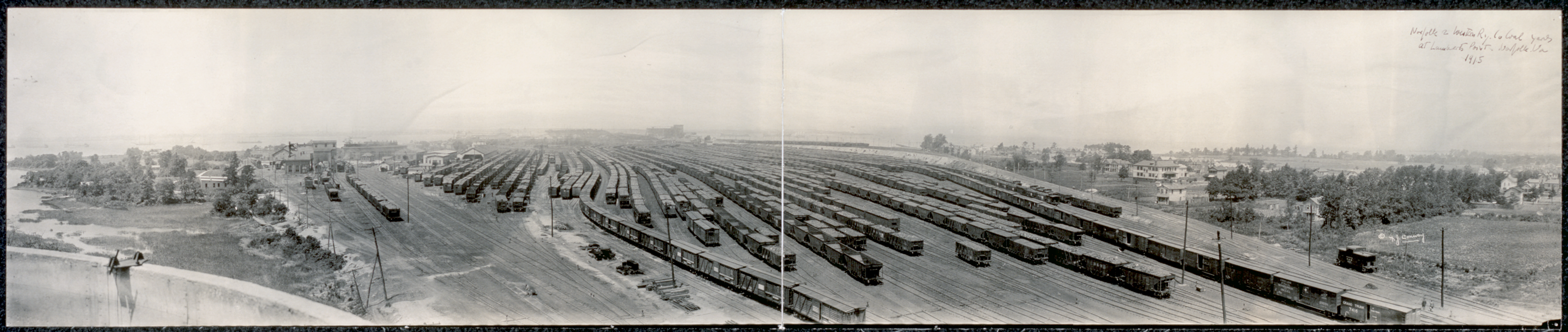
N&W coal yards, at Lambert's Point with the Elizabeth River to the west, c. 1915. Photograph by F. J. Conway.

== Norfolk Southern - Pier 6 ==
Lambert's Point is the home of Norfolk Southern's Pier 6, the largest and fastest transloading facility for coal in the Northern Hemisphere. The facility's annual throughput capacity is rated at 48 million tons. Unlike most facilities of its kind, Lambert's Point assembles all cargo in railcars and loads direct to vessel, rather than utilizing ground storage. The system is remarkably versatile due to its ability to blend individual lots up to five ways (a five-track blend), yet in increments as small as 100 tons. The 1850 pier has three berths, two for loading and a third which acts as a layberth, as well as two shiploaders. The facility can accommodate approximately 6,200 loaded railcars, and at full capacity, its dual twin rotary dumpers (capable of dumping up to four cars simultaneously) can dump 1,200 cars per day.

== Passenger service ==
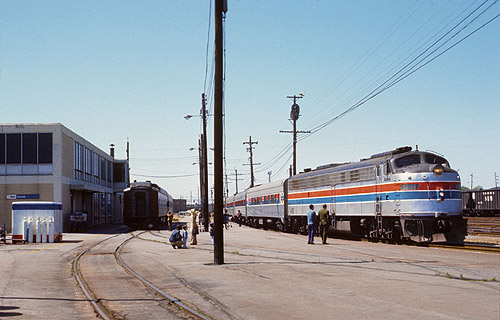
The Mountaineer at the Lambert's Point station in 1976

The N&W moved their Norfolk passenger station from Norfolk Terminal Station to a new structure near Lambert's Point in 1962. The station, at 2200 Redgate Avenue, remained in use under the N&W until 1971, then by the Amtrak Mountaineer from 1975 to 1977.

Preceding station	Amtrak	Following station
Suffolk toward Chicago	Mountaineer	Terminus

== Today ==
Today, adjacent port facilities for merchandise are operated by Lamberts Point Docks, Inc., a subsidiary of Norfolk Southern.

The United States Navy maintains the Lambert's Point Deperming Station, a magnetic silencing station located in the Elizabeth River off Lambert's Point. It is used by navy ships to reduce their magnetic signature, making them less vulnerable to certain types of mines. With fewer coal mines in West Virginia, coal traffic from the Blue Ridge Division, Bluefield, West Virginia, has decreased somewhat.
