= James Whitcomb Riley (train) =

American named passenger train (1941–1977)

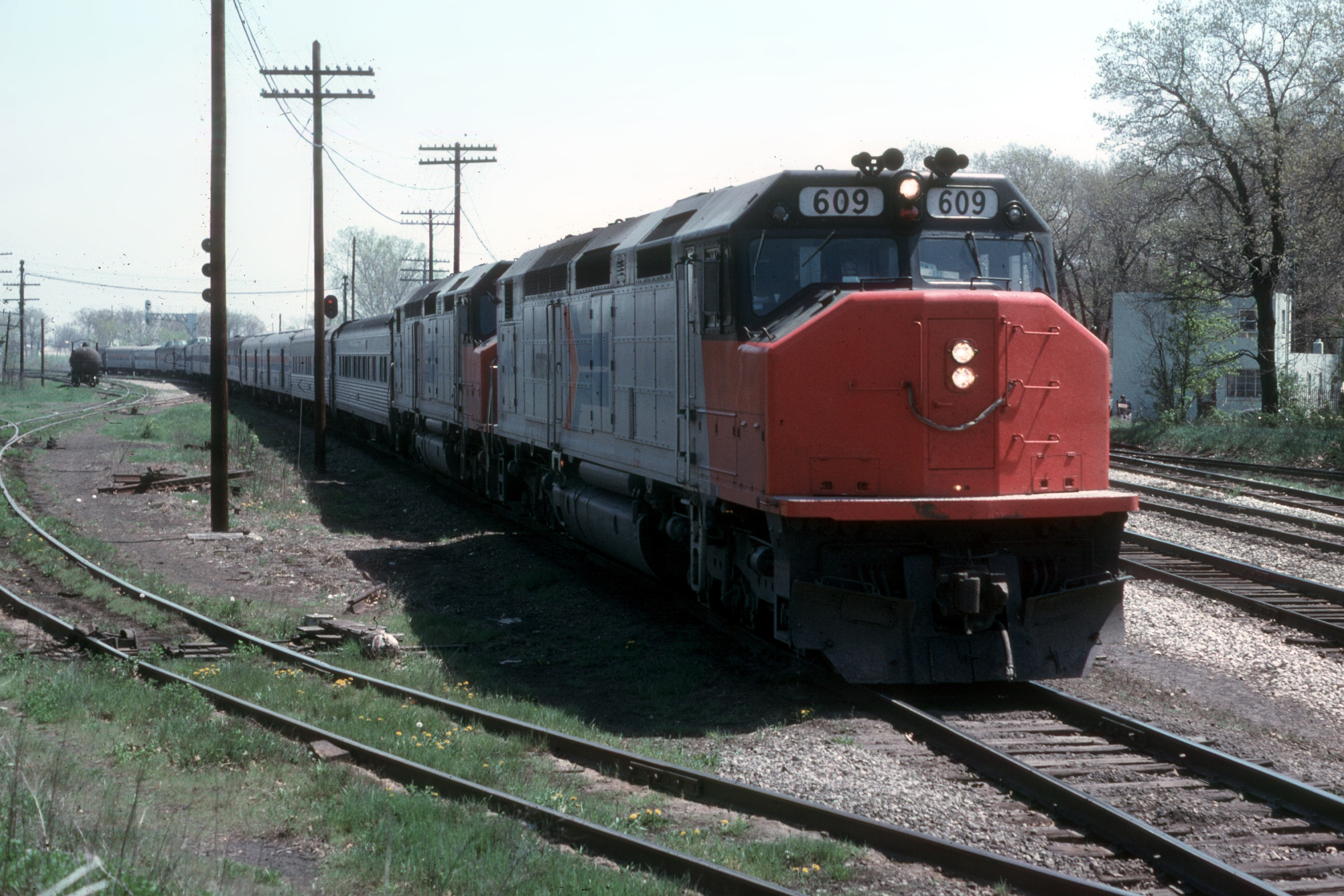
- The James Whitcomb Riley in Indiana in 1975

Overview
- Service type: Inter-city rail
- Status: Discontinued
- Locale: Midwestern United States
- First service: 1941
- Last service: 1977
- Successor: Cardinal
- Former operators: New York Central (1941–1968); Penn Central (1968–1971); Amtrak (1971–1977)

Route
- Termini: Chicago; Cincinnati, Ohio (1941–1971); Newport News, Virginia (1971–1976); Washington, D.C. (1971–1977)
- Distance travelled: 884 mi (1,422.66 km)
- Service frequency: Daily
- Train number: 50, 51

Technical
- Track gauge: 4 ft 8 1/2 in (1,435 mm)

The James Whitcomb Riley was a passenger train that operated between Chicago, Illinois, and Cincinnati, Ohio, via Indianapolis, Indiana. Originally operated by the New York Central Railroad, it was taken over by Amtrak in 1971. Under Amtrak, it merged with the Chesapeake & Ohio Railway's George Washington to become a Chicago-Washington/Newport News train. In 1977, it was renamed the Cardinal, which remains in operation.

== History ==
The James Whitcomb Riley was introduced by the New York Central on April 28, 1941, as a daytime, all-coach train between Chicago and Cincinnati by way of Indianapolis. It was named after the Hoosier poet James Whitcomb Riley, known for his celebration of Americana. The Riley was a companion to the Mercury streamliners which operated on the Chicago-Detroit and Chicago–Cleveland routes. The Riley was retained by the Penn Central (as trains 303 and 304) after its formation from the merger of the New York Central and Pennsylvania Railroad, but in 1968 it petitioned the Interstate Commerce Commission (ICC) for permission to abandon the service, citing the loss of a mail contract and the Chesapeake & Ohio Railway's termination of through sleepers on the Chicago–Newport News route. The ICC refused, and the Riley survived until the formation of Amtrak.

City	Departure time
Chicago (Central Station)	4:30 p.m.
Woodlawn, 63rd Street	4:40 p.m.
Kankakee	5:35 p.m.
Lafayette	6:52 p.m.
Indianapolis	8:00 p.m.
Cincinnati (Union Terminal)	11:00 p.m.
Source: Official Guide of the Railways, June 1941.

=== Amtrak ===
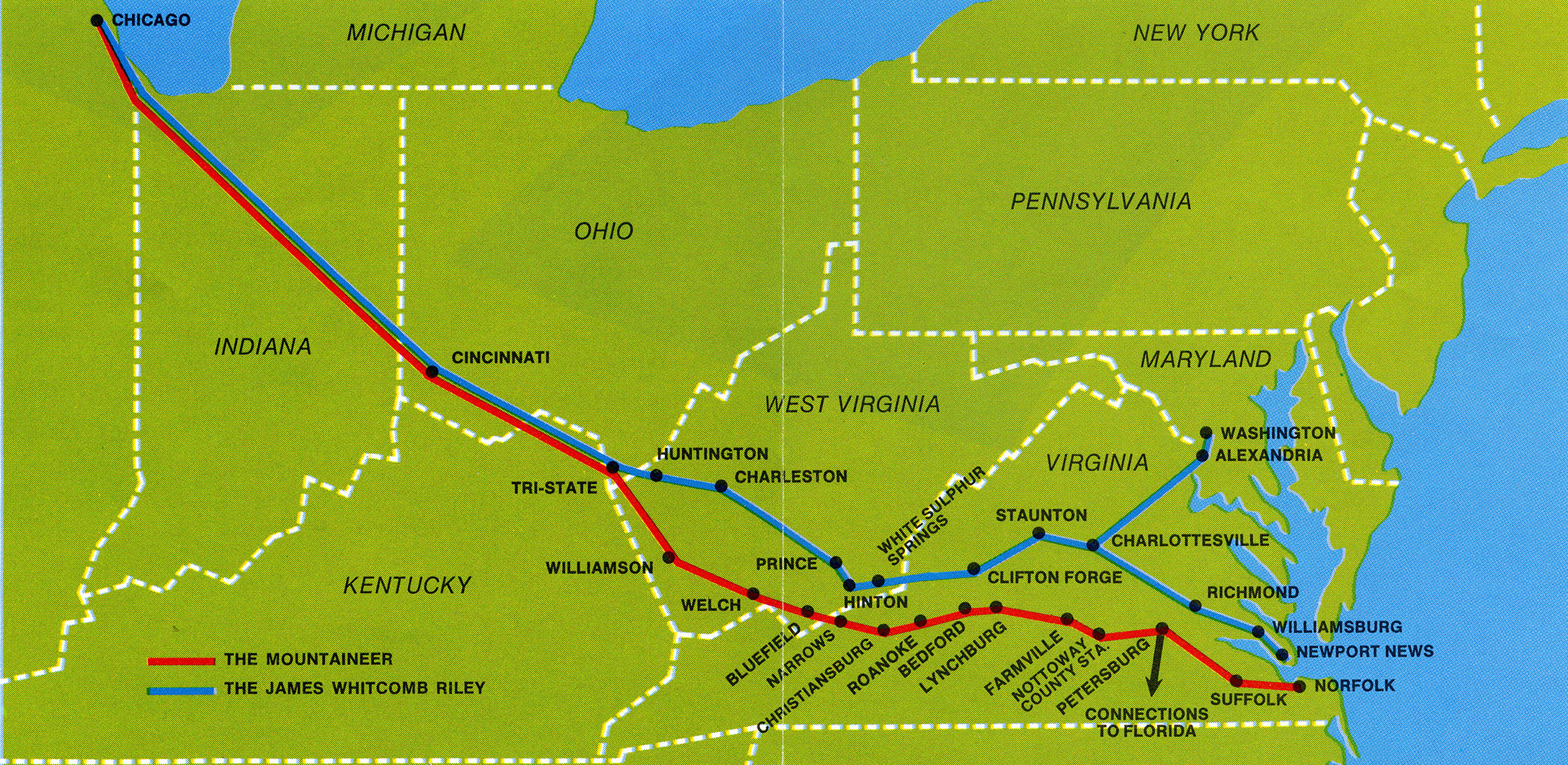
1975 map of the James Whitcomb Riley and the Mountaineer

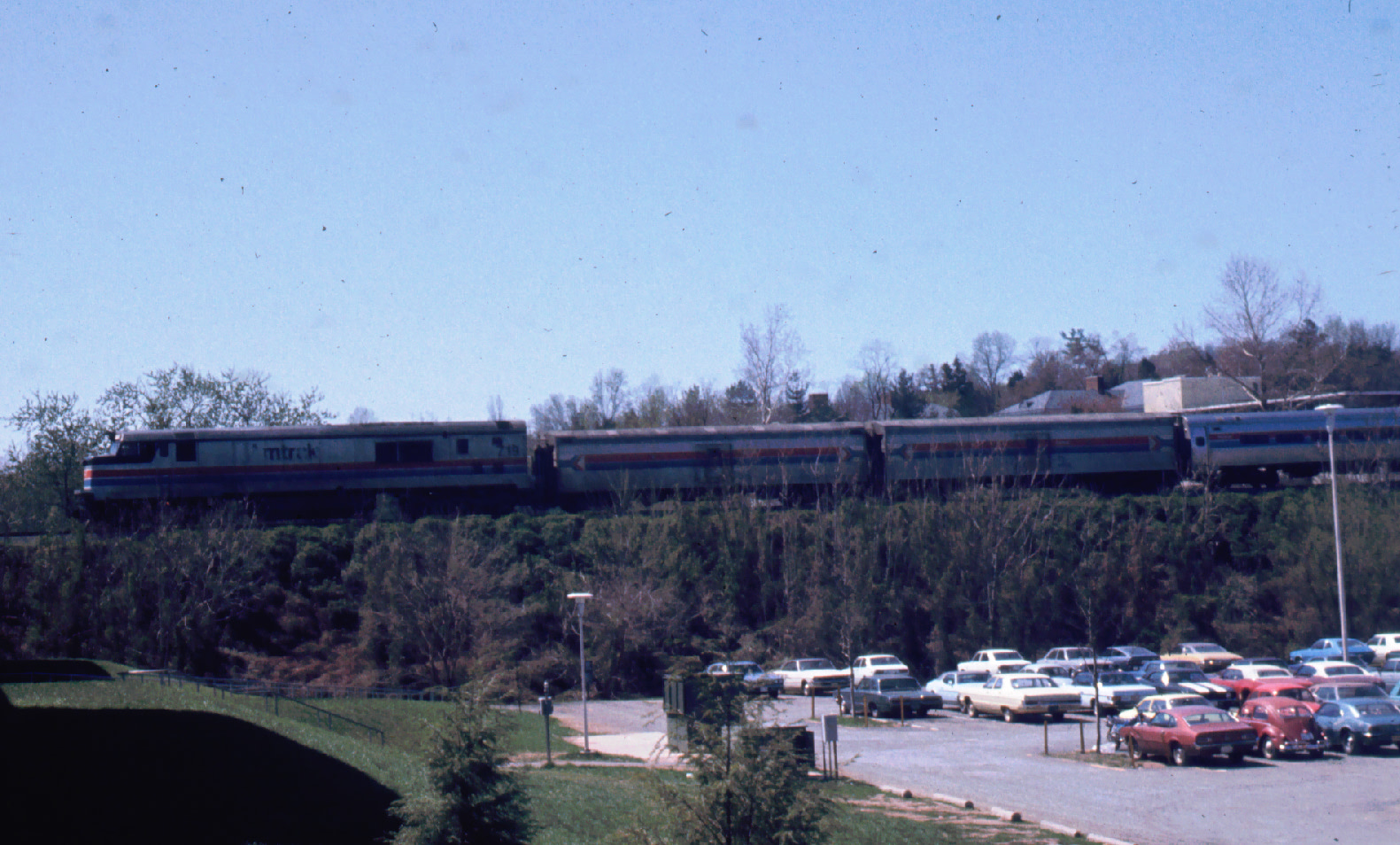
The eastbound James Whitcomb Riley in Charlottesville, Virginia in 1977

Amtrak, upon its 1971 commencement of operations, kept the Riley intact. During the summer, it began integrating the Riley with the George Washington, an old C&O sleeper running from Cincinnati to Washington, with a section splitting off at Charlottesville, Virginia to continue to Newport News. The George began exchanging Washington-Chicago and Newport News-Chicago through coaches with the Riley at Cincinnati on July 12, and a through sleeping car began September 8. Earlier, the George had handed its sleepers to the Riley for most of the 1950s.

With the November 14, 1971, schedule, the Riley and George Washington merged into a single long-distance Chicago-Washington/Newport News train. The merged train was known as the George Washington eastbound and the James Whitcomb Riley westbound. At the same time the route was extended from Washington to Boston, Massachusetts, and was assigned train numbers 50 eastbound and 51 westbound.

On March 6, 1972, the train was rerouted from Chicago's Central Station into Union Station. On April 30, the northern terminus was truncated back to Washington. A broadcast by CBS's 60 Minutes in 1973 revealed that the Riley was limited to 10 miles per hour (16 km/h) in Indiana due to deteriorating Penn Central track. In 1974 the Riley was re-routed off Penn Central trackage altogether along with the Floridian. On May 19, 1974, the Washington and Riley were fully merged, with the Riley name now used in both directions.

James Whitcomb Riley, March 1975
Trains 50 and 51		Trains 450 and 451	
City	Departure	City	Departure
Chicago, IL (Union Station)	2:35 p.m.		
Peru, IN	6:00 p.m.		
Muncie, IN	7:25 p.m.		
Richmond, IN (300 North 3rd Street)	8:25 p.m.		
Cincinnati, OH (River Road Station)	11:32 p.m.		
Catlettsburg, KY (Tri-State Station)	2:50 a.m.		
Huntington, WV	3:12 a.m.		
Charleston, WV	4:11 a.m.		
Prince, WV (Beckley)	5:46 a.m.		
Hinton, WV	6:26 a.m.		
White Sulphur Springs, WV	7:26 a.m.		
Clifton Forge, VA	8:27 a.m.		
Staunton, VA	9:36 a.m.		
Charlottesville, VA (Union Station)	10:35 a.m.		
Charlottesville, VA (Main Street Station)	11:10 a.m.	Charlottesville, VA (Main Street Station)	11:00 a.m.
Alexandria, VA	1:00 p.m.	Richmond, VA (Main St. Station)	1:05 p.m.
Washington, DC	1:30 p.m. (arrival)	Williamsburg, VA (Jamestown)	1:55 p.m.
Washington, DC	1:30 p.m. (arrival)	Newport News, VA	2:35 p.m. (arrival)
Source: The Mountaineer /The James Whitcomb Riley , Amtrak brochure, March 1975

A new train, the Mountaineer began service between Norfolk, Virginia (Lambert's Point Station), and Chicago (Union Station), in March 1975. It ran combined with the Riley between Russell Yard, the former C&O freight yard near Ashland, Kentucky, and Chicago.

In October 1975, Main Street Station in Richmond, Virginia, closed and the Riley moved to the C&O depot at Ellerson, on the outskirts of Richmond. A bus connected passengers to Broad Street Station, which itself was soon replaced by Staples Mill Road Station.

The section between Newport News and Charlottesville was discontinued on June 14, 1976. The Colonial began running over its former route between Newport News and Richmond, continuing northward to Washington and New York. The Riley ran between Chicago and Washington, via Charlottesville.

In 1977 the Mountaineer was replaced by the Hilltopper, which ran between Washington and Cattlettsburg, where it connected with the Riley for Chicago. A connecting bus via Petersburg, Virginia, served Norfolk.

The James Whitcomb Riley was renamed the Cardinal on October 30, 1977, as the cardinal was the state bird of all six states through which it ran. It was discontinued September 30, 1981 (by then having been extended to New York from Washington) and brought back by Congressional mandate on January 8, 1982.
