= Freeport station (Illinois) =

Rail station in Freeport, Illinois, US

Freeport, IL
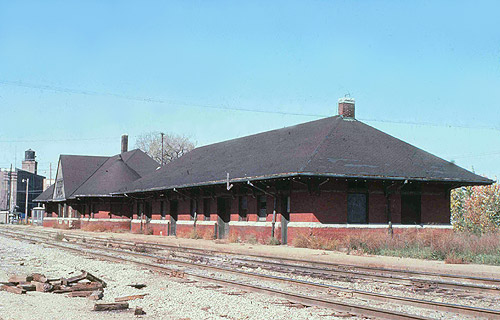
- Freeport station in 1981

General information
- Location: 239 East Stephenson Street; Freeport, Illinois
- Coordinates: 42.29970°N 89.61510°W
- Line: Freeport Subdivision

History
- Opened: 1853 (C&NW), 1855 (IC), February 13, 1974 (Amtrak)
- Closed: 1949 (C&NW) April 30, 1971 (Illinois Central); September 30, 1981 (Amtrak)

Former services
Preceding station	Amtrak	Following station
Warren toward Dubuque	Black Hawk 1974–1981	Rockford toward Chicago
Preceding station	Illinois Central Railroad	Following station
Eleroy toward Sioux City	Sioux City – Chicago	Evarts toward Chicago
Terminus	Freeport – Centralia	South Freeport toward Centralia
Scioto Mills toward Madison	Madison – Freeport	Terminus
Preceding station	Chicago and North Western Railway	Following station
Terminus	Freeport Branch	Ridott toward West Chicago
Location

Freeport station is a former train station in Freeport, Illinois. It was in use from 1849 to 1971 and 1974 to 1981.

== History ==
The Chicago and North Western Railway opened its Freeport Branch in 1849, followed by the Iowa Division of the Illinois Central Railroad in 1853. The two railroads eventually shared a station, while the Milwaukee Road used a separate station across the Pecatonica River. The station served Illinois Central's Hawkeye, Iowan, Land O'Corn, and Sinnissippi trains. Passenger service ceased upon the formation of Amtrak in 1971, but resumed between Chicago and Dubuque in 1974 under the name Black Hawk. Service ceased again on September 30, 1981. The depot still stands as a business. Plans for the restoration of the Black Hawk occurred in the early 2010s, but they were postponed indefinitely in 2014.
