= Galena station =

Rail station in Galena, Illinois

Galena, IL
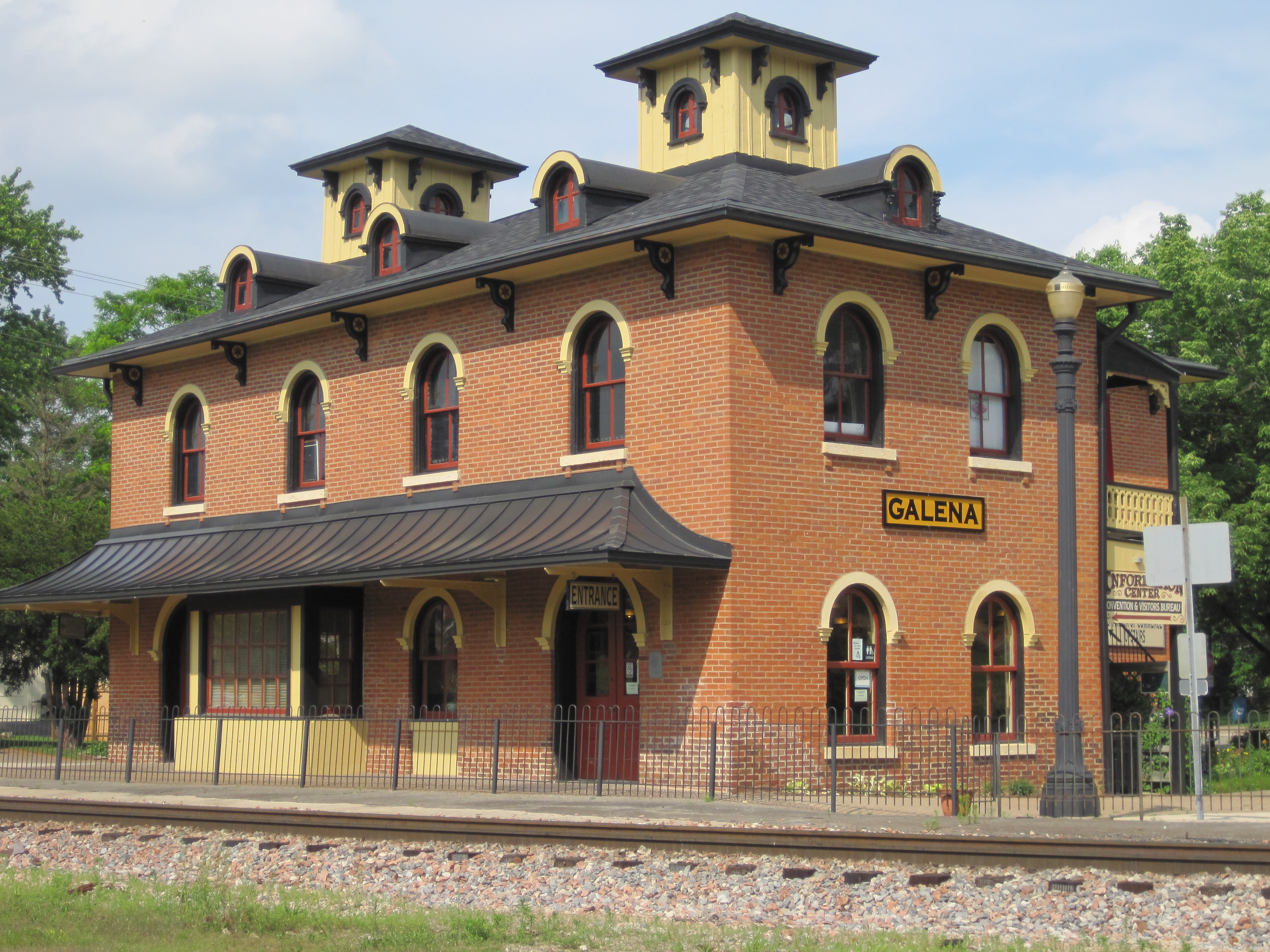
- The former station in 2010

General information
- Location: 101 Bouthillier Street; Galena, Illinois
- Line: Dubuque Subdivision

History
- Opened: October 30, 1854 (Illinois Central Railroad); February 13, 1974 (Amtrak)
- Closed: April 30, 1971 (Illinois Central); September 30, 1981 (Amtrak)

Former services
Preceding station	Amtrak	Following station
East Dubuque toward Dubuque	Black Hawk 1974–1981	Warren toward Chicago
Preceding station	Illinois Central Railroad	Following station
Portage, Il toward Sioux City	Sioux City – Chicago	Council Hill toward Chicago
- Galena station
- U.S. Historic district – Contributing property
- Interactive map of Galena station
- Coordinates: 42°24′43″N 90°25′44″W
- Built: 1857
- Part of: Galena Historic District (ID69000056)
- Designated CP: October 18, 1969
Location

The Galena station of Galena, Illinois was built in 1857 and originally served the Illinois Central Railroad. The two-story Italianate structure is included in the Galena Historic District. Over the years, the station hosted the Illinois Central's Hawkeye, Iowan, Land O'Corn, and Sinnissippi trains. These trains connected Galena residents as far as Chicago in the east and as far west as Sioux City, Iowa. Passenger service ceased upon the formation of Amtrak in 1971, but resumed between Chicago and Dubuque in 1974 under the name Black Hawk. Service ceased again in September 30, 1981. Today, the old depot hosts the Galena Visitors Bureau. Restoration of the Black Hawk was planned in the early 2010s, but the portion west of Rockford was indefinitely postponed in 2014.

== Bibliography ==
- Brownson, Howard Gray (1915). History of the Illinois Central Railroad to 1870. Urbana, Illinois: University of Illinois.
