= Elmhurst station (Amtrak) =

Former rail station in Elmhurst, Illinois, US

Elmhurst, IL
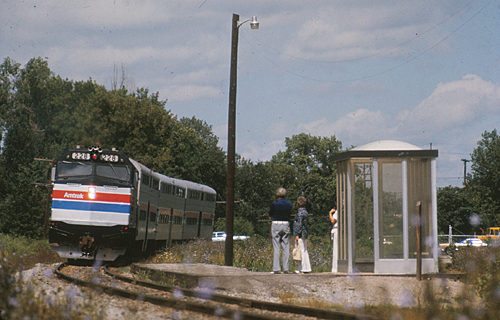
- The Black Hawk at Elmhurst station in 1977

General information
- Location: 588 South York Road; Elmhurst, Illinois
- Coordinates: 41.8821°N 87.9399°W
- Line: CN Freeport Subdivision

History
- Opened: 1892 (IC) 1974 (Amtrak)
- Closed: 1931 (IC) 1981 (Amtrak)

Former services
Preceding station	Amtrak	Following station
Rockford toward Dubuque	Black Hawk 1974–1981	Chicago Terminus
Preceding station	Illinois Central Railroad	Following station
St. Charles Road toward Addison	West Suburban	Hillside toward Randolph Street
Location

Elmhurst station is a former train station in Elmhurst, Illinois. The station was originally operated by the Illinois Central Railroad. The station served intercity trains and one of the railroad's commuter lines. Commuter operations ended in 1931 and all passenger service ceased during the post–World War II period.

When Amtrak inaugurated the Black Hawk a new station was constructed on the site of the original depot. It was little more than a shelter and small platform. It was in use from 1974 to 1981.
