= Warren station (Illinois) =

Rail station in Warren, Illinois

Warren, IL
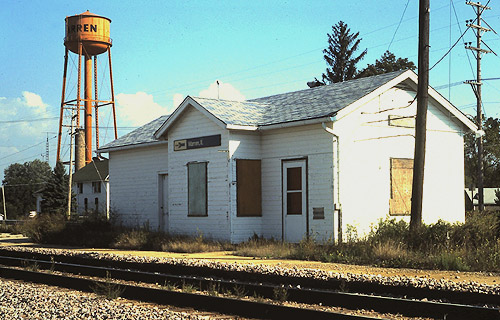
- Warren station in 1990

General information
- Location: Railroad Street at Burnett Avenue, Warren, Illinois 61087
- Coordinates: 42°29′44″N 89°59′12.5″W
- System: Inter-city rail station
- Line: Illinois Central Gulf

History
- Opened: January 9, 1854 (Illinois Central Railroad); February 13, 1974 (Amtrak)
- Closed: April 30, 1971 (Illinois Central); September 30, 1981 (Amtrak)
- Original company: Illinois Central

Former services
Preceding station	Amtrak	Following station
Galena toward Dubuque	Black Hawk 1974–1981	Freeport toward Chicago
Preceding station	Illinois Central Railroad	Following station
Apple River toward Sioux City	Sioux City – Chicago	Nora toward Chicago
Location

Warren is a former Amtrak railroad station in the city of Warren, Jo Daviess County, Illinois, United States. Located at the intersection of Railroad Street and Burnett Avenue in Warren, the station served the Black Hawk from February 13, 1974, to September 30, 1981. The station consisted of one side platform with a depot, which has since been demolished. Prior to Amtrak, the station served trains operated by the Illinois Central Railroad, which began service on January 9, 1854, when service was extended 25 miles (40 km) northwest from Freeport. Service continued until April 30, 1971, when the Hawkeye (Waterloo–Chicago) was discontinued on the day before Amtrak began passenger service.

== Bibliography ==
- Brownson, Howard Gray (1915). History of the Illinois Central Railroad to 1870. Urbana, Illinois: University of Illinois.
