= East Paterson station =

Former railway station in New Jersey, United States

East Paterson
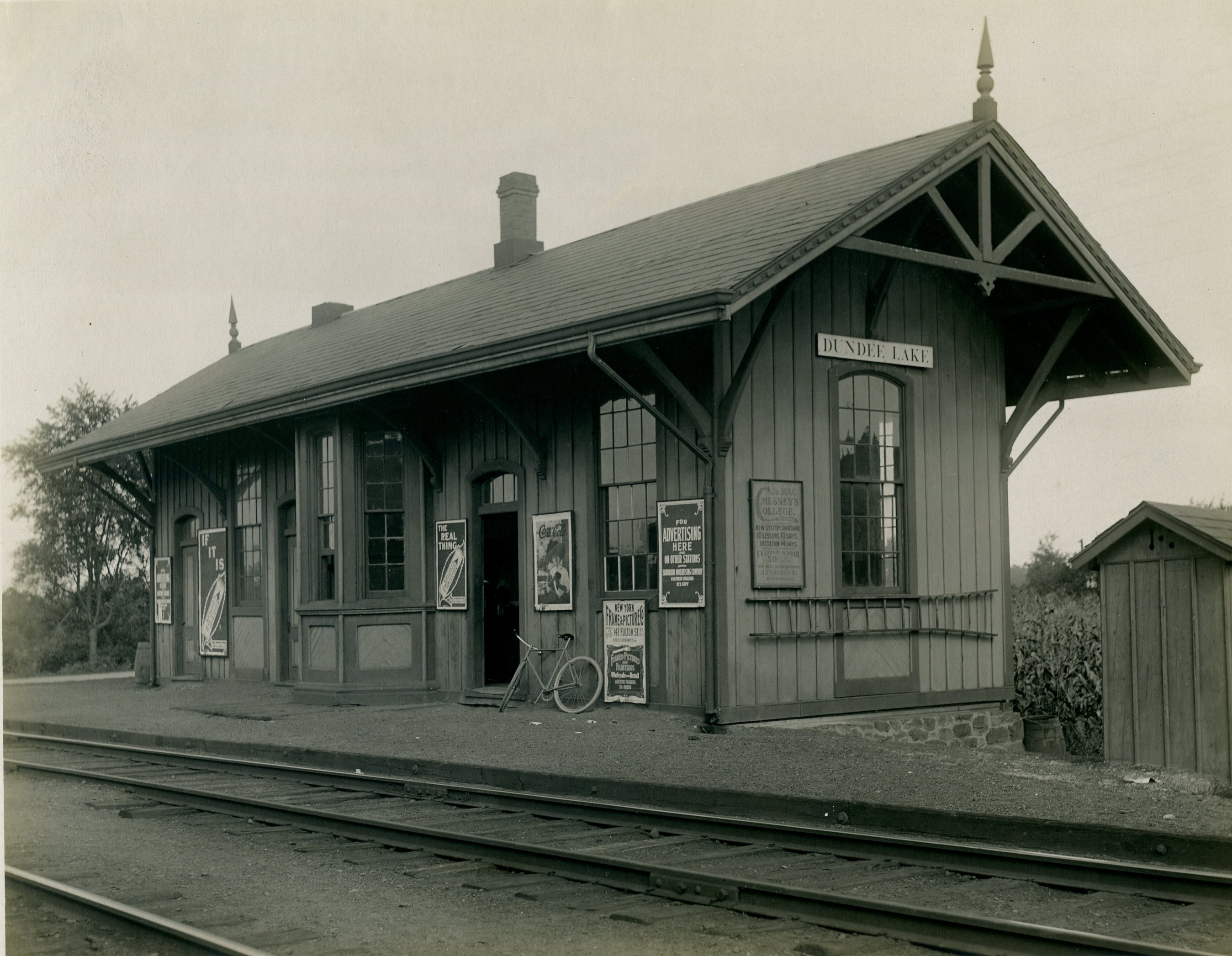
- East Paterson station on November 18, 1909 when the station was still named Dundee Lake.

General information
- Location: 533 River Drive, East Paterson, New Jersey
- Coordinates: 40.9037°N 74.1273°W
- Line: New York, Susquehanna and Western Railway
- Platforms: 1 side platform
- Tracks: 2

Other information
- Station code: 1107 (Erie Railroad)

History
- Opened: April 8, 1871; 155 years ago
- Closed: June 30, 1966; 60 years ago
- Electrified: Not electrified
- Former names: Dundee Lake (April 8, 1871–October 15, 1928)

Key dates
- October 13, 1969: 1904 station depot catches fire
- November 1969: 1904 station depot razed

Services
Preceding station	New York, Susquehanna and Western Railroad	Following station
Vreeland Avenue toward Stroudsburg	Main Line	Passaic Junction toward Susquehanna Transfer or Jersey City
Location

East Paterson was a former commuter railroad train station in the borough of East Paterson (renamed Elmwood Park in 1973), Bergen County, New Jersey. East Paterson station serviced freight and passenger trains of the New York, Susquehanna and Western Railway between the eponymous station in Butler to Pavonia Terminal in Jersey City (until December 12, 1958) and Susquehanna Transfer in North Bergen until June 30, 1966. The station contained a single low-level side platform and a 60-by-14-foot (18.3 m × 4.3 m) wooden frame depot on the north side of the tracks.

Train service through Saddle River Township began on April 8, 1871 with the opening of the New Jersey Midland Railroad to Pompton Township. At that time, the railroad established a station at Dundee Lake near the Passaic River. Dundee Lake became its own municipality on April 18, 1916 and the station retained that name until October 15, 1928, when the railroad changed it to East Paterson, despite the municipality becoming East Paterson in April 1916. After the discontinuation of passenger service on June 30, 1966, the station sat unused until October 13, 1969, when it caught fire. The depot came down that November.

== Station layout and services ==
Side platform, station depot
Outbound	← New York, Susquehanna and Western Railway weekdays toward Butler (Vreeland Avenue)
Inbound	New York, Susquehanna and Western Railway weekdays toward Susquehanna Transfer (Passaic Junction) → (Note: The termini of Butler and Susquehanna Transfer recognize the destinations at the end of passenger service on June 30, 1966.)

East Paterson station contained two tracks for the New York, Susquehanna and Western Railway along with a single side platform. The 60-by-14-foot (18.3 m × 4.3 m) wooden frame station depot contained four separate rooms of various dimensions. At the west end of the building was the freight office with a 6-by-14-foot (1.8 m × 4.3 m) rectangular design. The next room was one of the two waiting rooms with an 18-by-14-foot (5.5 m × 4.3 m) design. The waiting room was rectangular save for a small area to the east end which surrounded the agent's office. The 22-by-14-foot (6.7 m × 4.3 m) waiting room on the east side of the depot also contained the unique design. The agents office was 10 by 11 feet (3.0 m × 3.4 m), containing a half-hexagon bay window jutting out from the front of the depot. East Paterson station also contained a separate closet and a separate freight platform at the freight room.

At the end of passenger service on June 30, 1966, East Paterson station served six of the seven trains on weekdays only. Three of these trains were to Susquehanna Transfer station in North Bergen, where connections were available by bus to Port Authority Bus Terminal in New York City. Trains 906 and 916, arriving at 6:44 a.m. and 8:04 a.m., stopped at East Paterson, but train 910 did not. Service westbound to Butler station included four trains stopping at East Paterson: train 915 at 1:55 p.m., train 921 (a train only to North Hawthorne) at 5:31 p.m., train 929 at 6:07 p.m., and train 931 at 6:50 p.m.

== History ==
The New York and Oswego Midland Railroad opened the New Jersey Midland Railway through Bergen County on April 8, 1871, when they began service between Pavonia Terminal in Jersey City, Hudson County and Pompton Township in Passaic County. A depot was built in Saddle River Township near the Passaic River, named Dundee Lake. The depot contained a single platform with expansive views of the river. At the time of opening, the station had six trains in each direction.

In May 1889, Dundee Lake station became the chosen site of a new horse racing track in the area. The Coates family of Goshen, New York, were prominent horse racing and breeding enthusiasts and arranged to acquire property owned by Hartman Van Riper on May 29 for the track. With no 1 mile (1.6 km) track within a short distance of New York, the Coates family felt that the Van Riper site was perfectly level for horse racing and there was no risk for serious horse injuries given the marshy soil in the area. As part of the construction, the Susquehanna would build a new switch for the horse track. Articles of incorporation were filed with Saddle River Township in August, and the new race track opened on October 9, 1889.

However, the race track turned into a major financial disaster for the Coates. By 1890, a local judge ordered horse racing stopped at the new facility. The next year, George Engeman, who owned the race track in Brighton Beach, Brooklyn, purchased the facility from the Coates with the hope that the local Democratic Party officials would take control and allow horse racing to occur. This did not occur and the racetrack foreclosed. However, the property moved into the control of a company and helped instigate more construction in the area. The company broke up the land of the race track in favor of multiple 1–2 acres (0.40–0.81 ha) tracts to build houses. Two houses were built by March 1902, with four more under construction. A house of worship and a new school were also built.

The growing community resulted in talk the railroad considered replacing the station depot with a new one.

=== "Out of Order" (1903–1912) ===
The Susquehanna Railroad closed the station depot to the public in 1903, hanging a sign stating "out of order". Local opposition to this grew by March 1906, stated that the shuttered depot was harming development in the Dundee Lake area. Among listed problems caused by the decision included that land owners were facing higher tax values as the railroad would not be paying taxes. This would in addition, make living in Dundee Lake much more expensive compared to nearby communities. They also stated there was concerns about prospective buyers not coming in due to the higher expenses, stagnating the community's growth. They felt that the residents should take some action to help get the station open if there was no state law that would force the railroad re-open the depot.

By April 1906, a clearer version of the disrepair of Dundee Lake station appeared in the Bergen Evening Record. The closed depot had all its windows boarded, the door at the east end of the depot forced open, holes in the roof, and the waiting room floor collapsing because of cement stored on the wooden floor. The Erie Railroad put up a new sign stating to not look at the station conditions long. Another one stated that they should not look in the windows. Local citizens continued to put in complaints about the depot's abhorrent condition. They wanted action from the railroad, stating that it would not cost the railroad much financially to repair and reinstate the depot. They felt that the getting the depot in order and hiring a station agent would increase ridership to Dundee Lake, raising profit for the company. Some citizens did not agree, stating that the Boulevard signal station operator could double as the station agent and they could move the wires operating the junction to the depot. They also wanted a telegraph instituted in the new depot. The newspaper published a petition to the Erie Railroad in the April 1906 columns, stating it had been signed by the majority of citizens. The railroad removed the "Out of Order" sign after pressure from the newspaper.

After complaints, the Erie Railroad sent people to work in January 1907 to repair the depot. A new floor replaced the one crushed by cement, the windows replaced and hole-free, a new waterproof roof, along with a new stove placed in the depot. They also repainted the station in the interior and exterior. The renovated Dundee Lake depot would have two waiting rooms, one for women and one for men, along with a freight and baggage room at the west end of the building. A new agent would be operating at Dundee Lake station as of January 15, 1907. The railroad stated, that the sudden renovations was not due to the complaints by citizens, but a jump in freight business overloading the agent at Vreeland Avenue station in Paterson. A new dye house being built at Dundee Lake also would raise traffic for both passengers and freight as the new mill would hire 300–400 people and require 20 loads of coal daily to operate. The new dye house would likely open in early February.

However, the depot renovation and the new dye house meant an uptick in citizen moods and business in the Dundee Lake area. New houses were being built and rent for other properties went up, expecting the extra business. Because of the station depot's poor condition, several real estate deals fell through and real estate agents reported an uptick in business with the expected changes.

The renovations led to extreme growth in the Dundee Lake area and by November 1912, business, up 700 percent from rates in 1892, outgrew the baggage/freight room at the west end of the depot. A local company has been handling the growing cement, grain, coal and hay business. The dye house also grew significantly. Locals at the Dundee Lake Board of Trade stated that the station back in 1892 had an individual freight house for those services that could have better handled the increased business. However, the railroad was using the former freight room as a storage area for maintenance crews. The Board of Trade stated that there was major inconvenience for operators to have to use other stations in the area for their freight shipments. The Board of Trade made a committee to ask the railroad to help rectify the situation and expected a quick resolution.

A meeting with the railroad officials had to be postponed until the first week of December 1912. However, there was local concern about the possibility the community was looking at eliminating the job of Mazie Wilcox, the station agent. Theodore Chamberlain, a local coal executive felt that with the construction of a freight department, Wilcox would be fired and that someone strong enough to handle boxes and barrels would take over the job. Despite being told that the Vreeland Avenue agent did very little lifting in their position, Chamberlain changed his reasoning. This time Chamberlain stated that he was not charging them with doing that, but that Vreeland Avenue was so simple, then Mazie Wilcox would be able to do the job herself. The committees did not deny that Wilcox could be capable of doing her job and endorsed Wilcox for the freight agency.

=== From Dundee Lake to East Paterson (1916–1928) ===
Assemblyman John Ackerman, Jr. brought a bill to the floor in February 1916 for the incorporation of Dundee Lake as the borough of East Paterson. John B. Zabriskie, a resident of Wyckoff, had been the impetus for the bill, as he represented local industries, who wanted out of Saddle River Township. Despite being the one introducing the bill, Ackerman stated he opposed his own production, saying it should be up to the people. Assemblyman Caleb Pancoast of Camden was upset that Ackerman opposed his own bill. As a result, Ackerman asked that the voting be suspended. Despite objections, the Assembly Speaker stopped voting and noted that it was unlikely the bill would pass. J.D. Post, a Committeeman for the Bergen County Republican Party, stated that he opposed any further progress on the bill. As a result of the fracas in the Assembly, officials on February 29 called for a meeting and hearing to be held on March 4 at the Social Circle clubhouse near the local school in Dundee Lake. Local Bergen County legislators would be present for the hearing, of which they invited those who supported and opposed the incorporation. Despite the hearing, the bill came again on March 1 and passed the State Assembly, including Ackerman's vote of support.

Opposition was minimal at the March 4 meeting. With the high enthusiasm, the 51 people at the meeting passed resolutions endorsing the new bill for the creation of East Paterson, which would eat part of Saddle River Township from Warren Point to the Passaic River to Garfield.

The New Jersey State Senate held a hearing on March 14 over the bill, of which no one appeared in protest of the incorporation. The Committee of Boroughs and Townships, as a result, provided a favorable report on the measure to incorporate East Paterson. At least one senator who supported the bill stated that he did not prefer breaking up a municipality without a justified cause as Dundee Lake would take out 2,000 of Saddle River Township's 3,500 people. The only opposition heard about the measures were about farmers who would lose control of their vote on borough matters. However, there were more residents in support that would defeat any proposal by the farmers. Governor James Fairman Fielder signed the Ackerman bill on March 22, stating that the incorporation would be dependent on a local vote in April 1916, but the expectation was it would pass.

On April 18, 1916, the citizens held the election for incorporation. With 290 votes cast in total, 130 supported, 96 opposed and 14 ballots were rejected. The new municipality would have approximately 1,450 people. After that the county would be in charge until the elections department allowed them to have elections for borough officials.

By 1922, the station at East Paterson still retained the Dundee Lake name. The East Paterson Borough Council requested that Public Utility Commission force the railroad to change the name of the station to match. At a hearing on January 26, the Borough Council made the argument that the name was conflicting with the Dundee station further east on the Susquehanna. As a result, shipments meant for Dundee Lake were going to Dundee instead. The railroad's argument was that changing the name was pointless because using East Paterson would cause the exact same amount of confusion with the stops in the city of Paterson. Because of the similar names, shippers could reasonably confuse East Paterson for any of the Paterson stops. The Public Utility Commission stated that they agreed with the railroad that changing the name would exist either way and denied the request.

After several years of frustration, the Susquehanna started to budge on the name change in March 1927. Susquehanna officials wrote a letter to the Borough Council about a recent request to try again on changing the name. The railroad stated that they were considering it and believed that it was likely to happen.

The railroad changed the name of the station officially to East Paterson on October 15, 1928, to local celebration, including the Board of Trade, which was the impetus in getting the name changed.

=== 1946 Motorailer fire ===
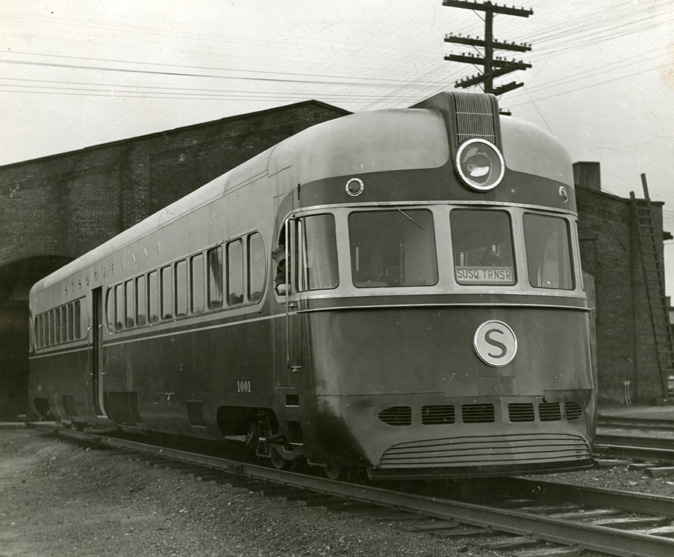
ACF Motorailer no. 1001, the train that caught fire, at the yards in North Hawthorne, c. 1940

At 11:45 p.m. on January 20, 1946, a Paterson City station-bound, Susquehanna-operated, American Car and Foundry-built Motorailer no. 1001 caught fire at the East Paterson–Saddle River line. After a sudden loud noise, flames shot out of the center of the Motorailer, which was the location of the oil box. Passengers, which were north of 30, fled to the back of the car in a panic for their safety, despite the conductor attempting to calm them down. Al Gilbert, the conductor, broke a window on the back of a car to allow them to escape. Passengers who escaped ran and rolled down the railroad embankment to safety. The still aflame Motorailer eventually burned itself down completely. Saddle River Township police responded at 11:55 p.m. but could not handle the fire as it was burning due to lack of nearby hydrant water. As a result, the hoses could be not be used until the car was completely burned.

Several people were injured in the melee, with several people suffering from glass cuts from the window, along with burns from the fire. The Susquehanna sent an extra train to East Paterson to help get most passengers to Paterson. Some passengers walked the Susquehanna tracks to East Paterson station or to nearby U.S. Route 46/Route 6 to catch transportation to Paterson. The remains of Motorailer no. 1001 were towed by the railroad to the yards at North Hawthorne. By the morning of January 22, no cause for the fire had been determined, but Ernest Laird, Jr., a teenage rider, noted that when the Motorailer reached Hackensack station, a knocking sound in the car developed and it grew louder as the train accelerated. When the fire was discovered in Saddle River Township, the noise that Laird heard disappeared. The railroad discovered the cause of the fire on January 22. A broken rod in the Motorailer's engine damaged the engine housing. The damage resulted in oil in the engine, under the center of the car, igniting.

At North Hawthorne, the railroad had the car inspected by an insurance adjuster. The adjuster declared the fire-ridden shell of the car a total loss save for some parts saved from the back of the train. The railroad then towed the car to Little Ferry, where it was scrapped. The insured loss for no. 1001 totaled $70,000 (1946 USD), while the railroad also gained $8,000 in salvage fees for the charred ruins. Walter Kidde, the Susquehanna Railroad trustee, noting an uptick in passenger ridership and the lack of available equipment after the fire, requested the acquisition of the two remaining Motorailers, once used by the Illinois Central Railroad on their Land O'Corn service. The cars were renovated and brought to the Susquehanna on November 5.

=== Marcalus/Du Mont railroad spur fights ===
Marcalus and Du Mont came back to the East Paterson Borough Council on the night of April 15, 1953 to restart progress on the construction of a railroad spur on River Drive. The 1953 version of the spur would fork off the railroad tracks at River Drive opposite the East Paterson station. The spur would parallel River Drive and contain two tracks that would cross at Market Street near the traffic light. Despite the fact that East Paterson had no sidewalk on the west side of River Drive, the borough would have to eliminate their rights to create one. Du Mont noted that they would use the spur for expansion of their plant, which would later lead to move revenue for the borough in taxes. Mayor Walter W. Brower stated that the municipality would discuss the proposal in a special meeting and informed the Borough Clerk, Walter Bredder, to notify potentially affected businesspeople and residents.

A meeting came on April 27, with 100 people showing to display their opposition to the railroad spur. Residents noted that the double Market Street grade crossings would cause automobile congestion. Charles Rais, a local resident, noted that the 1950 ordinance granted by East Paterson gave permission to Du Mont to build the spur. However, Rais stated that the ordinance never specified where the spur would be located other than west of River Drive. The borough asked their counsel, Arthur Messineo, to investigate Rais' claims. Several former East Paterson officials (two councilmen and a former mayor) noted that the easement would make River Drive too narrow for automobile traffic, adding that the road was already small enough for the traffic it held. The President of the Chamber of Commerce asked about safety, noting that the market Street/River Drive intersection was already a dangerous one with 34 accidents in a year's span.

The Council asked a Susquehanna engineer, Andrew Blyker, if the railroad crossings could be elevated or depressed to eliminate car traffic issues, but stated that the Marcalus's plant location would affect the ability to do so. However, despite the negative response, the Bergen County of Freeholders members in attendance said they were likely to support the easement.

However, at the May 21, 1953 meeting, the Borough Council were stunned to find out they could not make the final decision on whether to grant Du Mont and Marcalus their rail spur. Messineo informed the Council that the Public Utilities Commission would have the final say on allowing it or not. Messineo stated that Du Mont and Marcalus would then file their applications to the Commission instead of East Paterson. Messineo did feel that the companies were right under the 1950 ordinance to allow them to create a spur. The Council responded in kind to create a new ordinance if they find a loophole in the Utility Commission requirements. However, Mayor Brower did not want to support the new spur, suggesting instead that the spur should be on the Marcalus property entirely. Columbo Cammano, the attorney for Marcalus, also presented the Borough Council with a petition from 80 Marcalus workers supporting the project.

The next Borough Council meeting on June 18 brought more delays. Brower stated that any approval from East Paterson on the spur would come after Messineo determined whether or not the municipality retained the right to approve the easement. Also, John Sepede, the East Paterson Borough Engineer, was writing a report about the spur to determine the engineering feasibility. Brower told Cammarano that the report would be ready with an ordinance on July 2, the next Council meeting, if Messineo gave them the legal go-ahead. At the July 2 meeting, the Borough Council moved to introduce the ordinance allowing the easement. However, Cammarano asked that the motion be delayed until he and his staff went over the proposed ordinance. Local residents and officials returned in force for the meeting, stating that the proposed ordinance would set East Paterson "back 50 years" and "hamper freedom of traffic". James Campbell, one of the Councilmen, stated that a 12-hour survey of traffic at the River Drive and Market Street intersection reflected a 1,000 cars per hour rate each day. The Borough Council postponed the decision again at the August 7 meeting, pending the delayed report of the Borough Engineer. The mayor did not want to act without the engineer in presence at the meeting.

At the September 3 meeting, a reading of the ordinance passed 4–2, despite vociferous objections from Mayor Brower and those in attendance. Sepede, the Borough Engineer, skipped his 20th wedding anniversary celebration to attend the meeting for the report. Brower thought Sepede's claim that the residents would not be inconvenienced was less than genuine. Brower shouted at the meeting that it was a "perpetration on the borough I shall never forget!"

The reaction in East Paterson was similar to Brower's. Residents formed a new commission, the East Paterson Neighbors Civic Association, to help get their voice heard in the community. One of their first action was to declare their opposition to the spur in advance of the next meeting on October 1. Jay Hunter, the President, demanded that the Council go back on the spur and then eliminate the 1950 ordinance allowing this decision. Hunter added that any new tracks should be elevated or depressed and not interfering with automobile traffic, especially in a time where municipalities were working to eliminate grade crossings. Hunter added that residents were being ignored by the companies, including Marcalus, which was causing odors around East Paterson from their factory. Hunter felt that there is a question on why the four Republican Party members were so eager to pass it while the Democratic Party members were opposed.

The October 1 meeting saw a change of plans due to political squabbling. James Campbell, the Democratic Party minority leader asked that the ordinance be rescinded. Republican members Peter Argentero and Eugene Molnar preferred tabling the decision until after the elections on November 3. Argentero and Molnar felt that the railroad spur had become political and with everyone at arms over the first reading of the ordinance, that they wanted it handled in a less angry environment. Louis Dodero, a Democratic candidate for mayor, Richard Baker of the Chamber of Commerce, Police Chief Charles Dap, Roy Roth, the local postmaster and former mayor John Kerwin all spoke in defense of Campbell, voicing their opposition. Argentero and Molnar won out and the motion was tabled rather than eliminated. At the meeting on October 15, Kerwin pressed them to make a decision rather than waiting until after the November elections. However, any thoughts of a November hearing were off the table. Arthur Messineo informed the East Paterson Borough Council that the tabling of the ordinance killed any approvals for the spur. With no date set on October 1 for the proposed post-election hearing, the ordinance no longer had any value and Messineo stated they could not revisit.

=== Closure and station fire ===
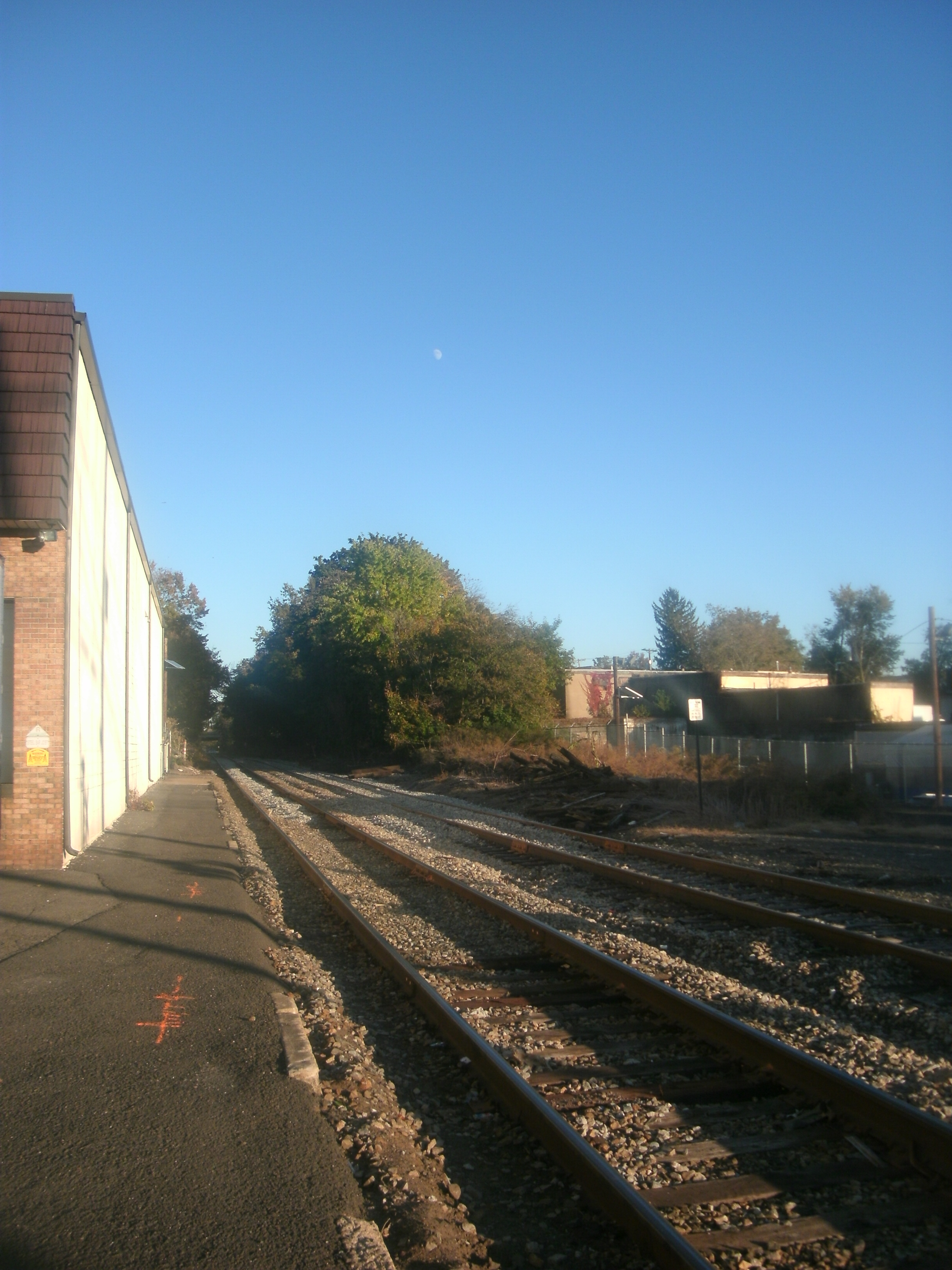
The former East Paterson station site in November 2011. The former platform remained on the north side of the tracks.

On April 17, 1963, the Borough Council received word that the Susquehanna was attending a hearing of the Public Utilities Commission on April 18 to discontinue agent services at East Paterson station. The Susquehanna's notice stated that they wanted to move the Passaic Junction freight agent, stationed at East Paterson to Passaic Junction itself and abandon the East Paterson depot. The Passaic Junction agent had been stationed at East Paterson after the former station burned in 1959. The railroad built a new station and wanted to return the agent to his proper post. The Council agreed to have Sam Scillieri, an attorney, protest the petition. The council's official stance would be that the freight agent being eliminated was fine, as long as passenger service did not go with it.

At the hearing, the railroad stated that the passenger numbers at East Paterson was low enough to justify discontinuing the passenger station. Trains would, as East Paterson wished, continue to stop at the station, but there would be no ticket services or station agent to operate.

At a secondary hearing on May 14, the Public Utilities Commission announced that their decision was to allow the Susquehanna to move its freight agent back to Passaic Junction station. However, the railroad did not get its wish to abandon the East Paterson depot. The borough would retain its passenger depot for riders to stay dry during inclement weather.

The Susquehanna discontinued passenger service to East Paterson station when they ended all train service between Susquehanna Transfer and Butler station on June 30, 1966.

Railroad officials stated in early October 1969 that they were considering demolishing the station because East Paterson officials complained of the overgrowth of weeds around the closed station.

At 10:15 p.m. on October 13, 1969, the East Paterson station caught fire. Multiple calls to authorities by the same woman were made reporting that an explosion was heard prior to the fire. The four fire companies of East Paterson reported to station to put the fire out. By 10:45, Fire Chief Phillip DeMaria stated the fire was under control. However, they were still washing down the structure past midnight of October 14. Public Service Energy and Gas were sent to turn off electrical power to the smoldering depot and defense authorities rerouted traffic away from River Drive. DeMaria stated that the station, which by that time was being used for maintenance purposes, such as storing of supplies, was a complete loss due to the fire damage. However, the fire was determined to be of "suspicious origin" that night. Angelo Powella, the East Paterson Building Inspector, announced on November 19 that he approved a permit for the Susquehanna Railroad to demolish the charred remains of the station.

New Jersey Transit proposed a single side platform stop at Mola Boulevard in the renamed Elmwood Park in its Passaic–Bergen Rail Line in 2007, which would have run between Hawthorne and Hackensack.

== Bibliography ==
- Catlin, George L. (1872). Homes on the Midland for New York Business Men. New York, New York: J. W. Pratt.
- Mohowski, Robert E. (2003). The New York, Susquehanna & Western Railroad. Johns Hopkins University Press. ISBN 0-8018-7222-7.
- Board of Public Utility Commissioners (1922). Reports of the Board of Public Utility Commissioners of the State of New Jersey Volume 9. Trenton, New Jersey: State Gazette Publishing Company.
- New Jersey State Legislature (1912). Documents of the One Hundred and Thirty Sixth Legislature of the State of New Jersey and the Sixty-Eighth Under the New Constitution: Vol. II Documents 5 to 16 Inclusive. Trenton, New Jersey: State Gazette Publishing Company.
