= Halsted station (CTA Orange Line) =

Chicago "L" station

Halsted 800W 2500S
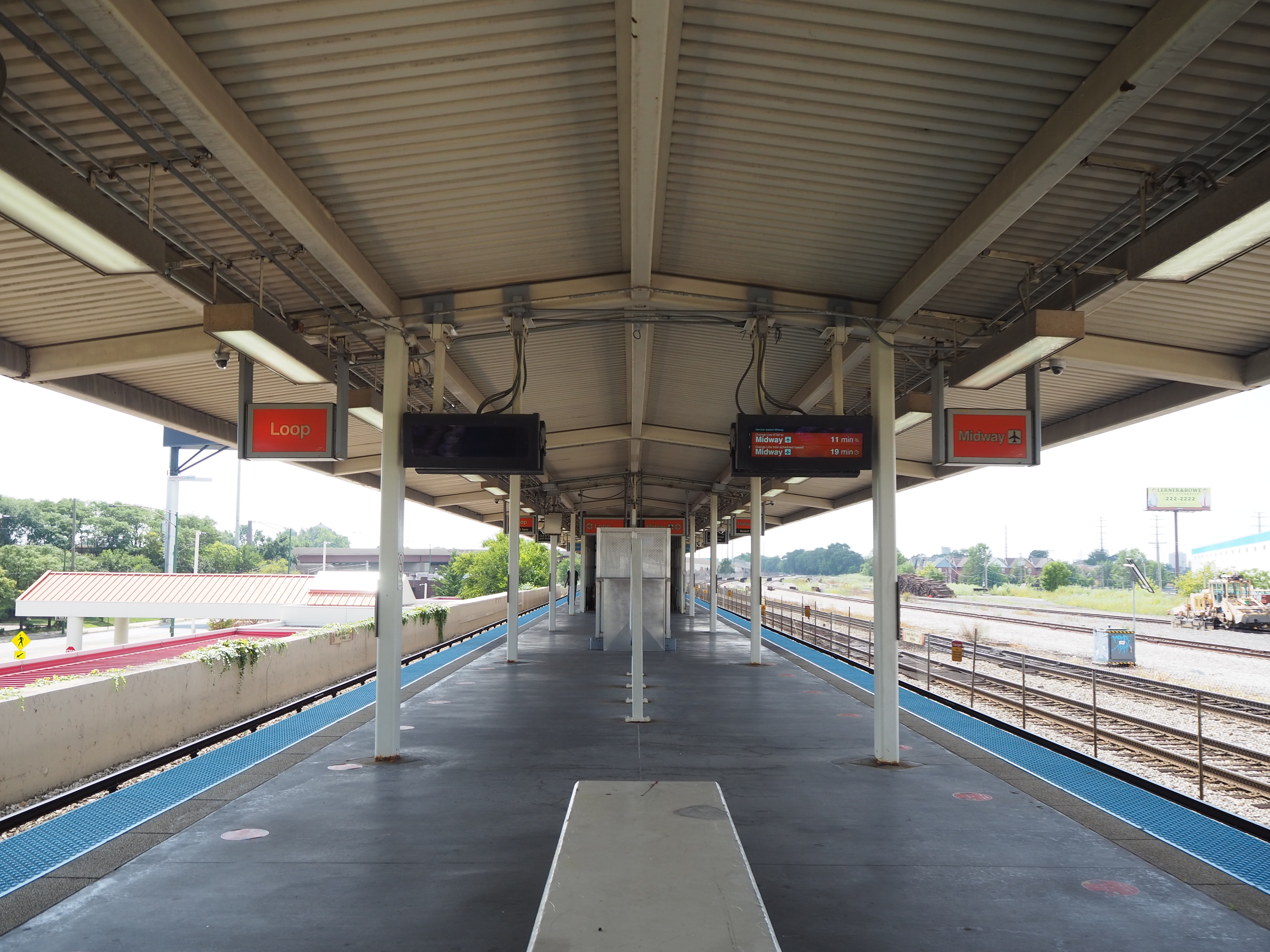
- Halsted station in 2021

General information
- Location: 2520 South Archer Avenue; Chicago, Illinois
- Coordinates: 41.84678°N 87.64809°W
- Owner: Chicago Transit Authority
- Line: Midway Branch
- Platforms: 1 island platform
- Tracks: 2
- Connections: CTA: 8 44 62

Construction
- Structure type: Embankment
- Parking: 31 spaces
- Cycle facilities: Yes
- Accessible: Yes

History
- Opened: October 31, 1993 (formal opening); November 3, 1993 (full service)

Passengers
- 2025: 534,635 ▲1.6%

Services
Preceding station	Chicago "L"	Following station
Ashland toward Midway	Orange Line	Roosevelt toward Loop (Library)
Former services at Halsted Street
Preceding station	Metra	Following station
Brighton Park toward Joliet	Heritage Corridor	Chicago toward Union Station
Preceding station	Alton Railroad	Following station
Brighton Park toward St. Louis	Main Line	Chicago Terminus
Preceding station	Illinois Central Railroad	Following station
Lawndale Avenue toward Addison	West Suburban	Roosevelt Road toward Randolph Street
Track layout
Location

Halsted station is an "L" station on the CTA Orange Line, located near the intersection of Halsted Street and Archer Avenue in the Bridgeport neighborhood of Chicago. The station opened in 1993 as part of the extension to Midway Airport. A previous railroad station just to the east opened in 1902 and served the Metra Heritage Corridor until 1984.

== History ==
=== Alton Railroad station ===
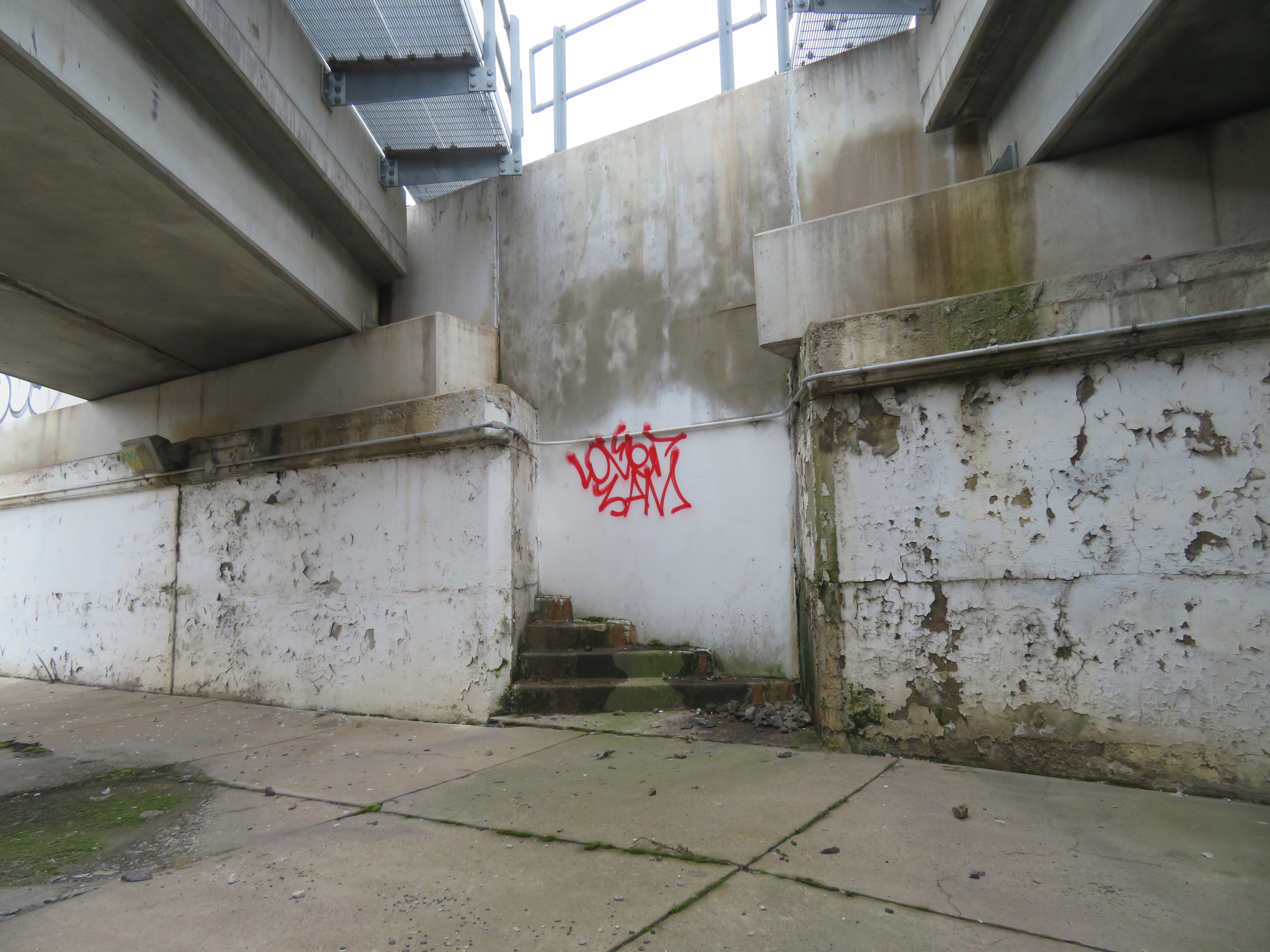
Now-closed stairs to the former station

Halsted Street station opened in 1902 on the Alton Railroad, replacing the 23rd Street station to the east, which was closed due to elevation of the tracks. By 1911, it had three separate island platforms east of Halsted Street serving the lines of the Alton Railroad (now the Joliet Subdivision), the Illinois Central Railroad (now the Freeport Subdivision), and the Atchison, Topeka, and Santa Fe Railroad (now the Chillicothe Subdivision). Each platform had a separate set of stairs from Halsted Street; the station building was located on the Alton Railroad platform.

The station was served by Illinois Central West Line commuter trains until they were discontinued in 1931. The Regional Transportation Authority (RTA) began subsidizing remaining commuter service in 1974, including the Alton Railroad service as the Heritage Corridor. The RTA closed the station on May 15, 1984, along with neighboring Brighton Park and eleven other stations in the system, due to low ridership.

=== "L" station ===
Construction of the $410 million Midway Line began in 1987. The line largely used existing railroad rights-of-way, including the Joliet Subdivision though the Bridgeport neighborhood. It opened as the Orange Line on October 31, 1993. The new Halsted station is located west of the Halsted Street overpass. Like all stations on the line, it was built with an elevator for accessibility.
