= Brighton Park crossing =

Railroad crossing in Chicago, Illinois, US

Coordinates: 41.8267°N 87.6871°W

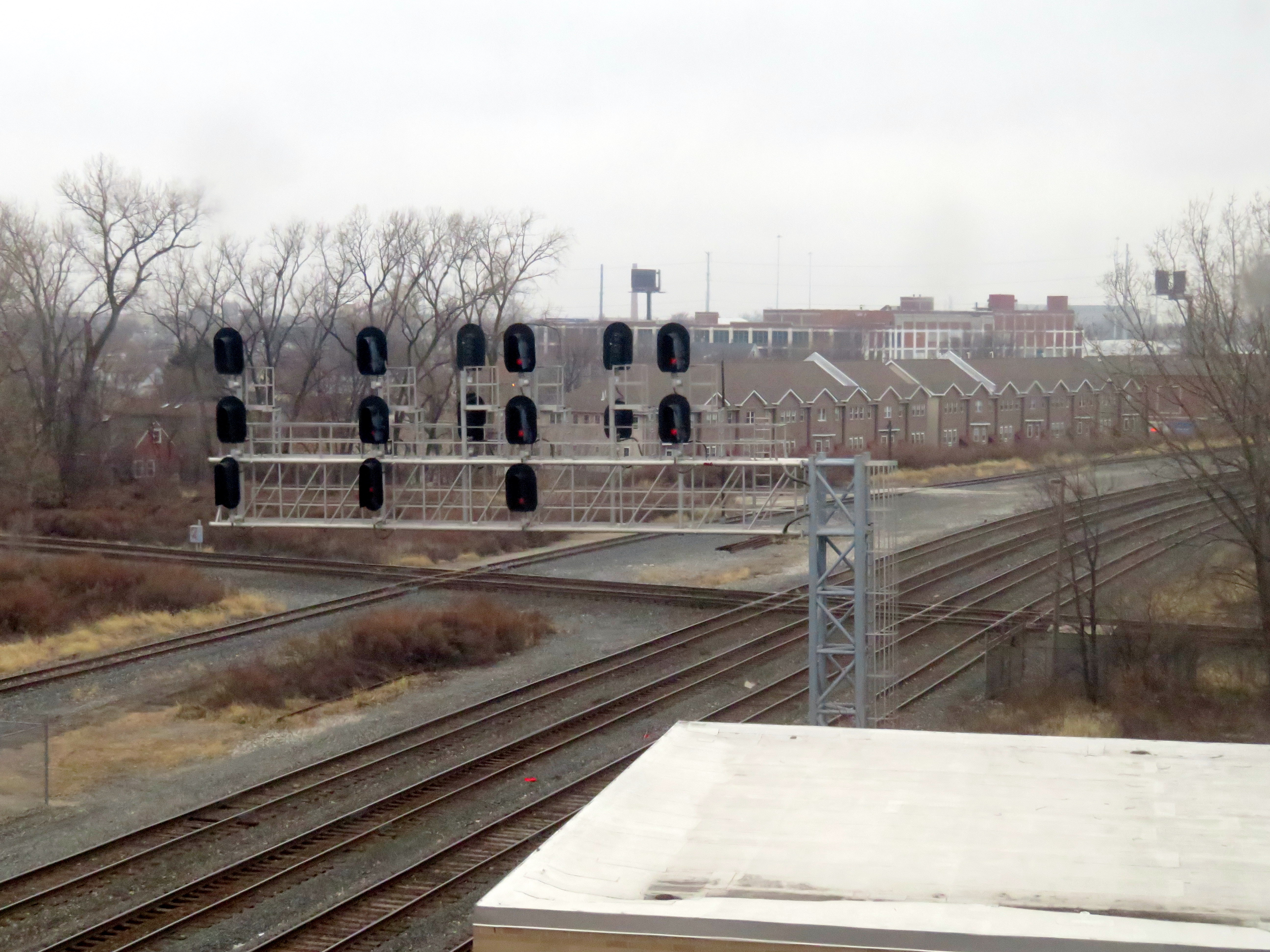
Brighton Park crossing in 2018

The Brighton Park crossing is a major railroad crossing in Chicago, Illinois, hosting three major freight railroads. The crossing is northwest of the intersection of Western Avenue and Archer Avenue, in the Brighton Park neighborhood of Chicago, Illinois. The railroads involved in the crossing are CSX, Canadian National and Norfolk Southern. The crossing consists of the CN's two-track Joliet Subdivision in a roughly east–west orientation intersecting five north–south tracks operated by NS and CSX. Collectively, these railroads operate approximately 80 trains per day through the crossing. The junction is visible from the CTA Orange Line trains that pass on an elevated structure immediately southeast of the crossing.

The CN line was formerly the main line of the Gulf Mobile & Ohio and its predecessor Alton Railroad, and this location hosted the GM&O's Brighton Park passenger stop. The line currently carries Metra Heritage Corridor commuter trains to Joliet and Amtrak passenger trains to St. Louis. Metra formerly operated a Brighton Park station located near the crossing, but this station was closed in 1984.

Until July 6, 2007, the crossing was controlled by a human switchtender in a cabin near the crossing using semaphore signals to govern train movements through the diamonds. Because the crossing was not interlocked, all trains were required to make a stop before proceeding over the crossing as signaled by the specific semaphore signal governing the track the train was on. As a major crossing, and one of the few remaining locations with this classic method of operation, Brighton Park was a major attraction for rail enthusiasts, but had become increasingly inefficient for Chicago area rail operations. As part of the Chicago Region Environmental and Transportation Efficiency Program (CREATE) project, the Brighton Park crossing, the semaphore signals, and switchtender's cabin were taken out of service on the evening of Friday, July 6, 2007, and conversion to an interlocked crossing ensued over the following weekend. As part of the conversion project, some of the tracks at the crossing were realigned and new crossing diamonds were put in place.

== History ==
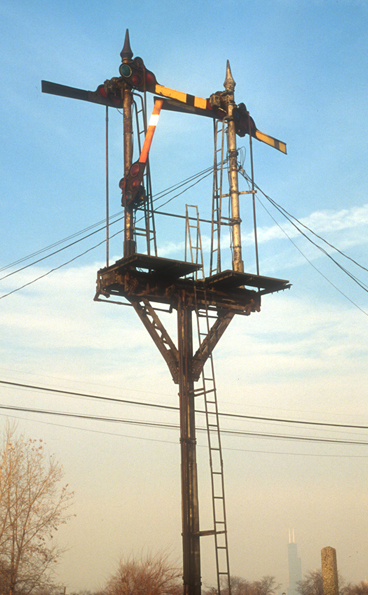
The bracket post that carried five semaphores governing train movements in three different directions at Brighton Park. The Willis Tower can be seen amidst the haze in the background.

By the early 20th century, the Brighton Park crossing comprised tracks belonging to the Baltimore and Ohio Chicago Terminal Railroad; the Chicago Junction Railroad, eventually controlled by the New York Central Railroad as the Chicago River and Indiana; and the Pittsburgh, Cincinnati, Chicago and St. Louis Railroad, commonly known as the "Panhandle Route", which was controlled by the Pennsylvania Railroad (PRR) running north to south and crossing the Chicago and Alton main line running east to west. The PCC&StL was the first railroad to cross the C&A at Brighton Park in the 1860s and therefore was responsible for arranging the safe crossing of trains. As other railroads built along the Panhandle right of way, this arrangement remained in effect with the responsibility passing to the PRR.

For the PRR the Panhandle Route connecting Pittsburgh and Cincinnati via Indianapolis was of secondary importance to its Main Line via Fort Wayne, Indiana, with the latter having direct access to Chicago Union Station from the south, while the Panhandle route ran west of the city to loop around and access the station from the north. The Baltimore and Ohio was somewhat late arriving into the Chicago market and had to use trackage rights and the Panhandle right of way to eventually reach Grand Central Station via a similar out and back loop route and arrived south of downtown via the St. Charles Air Line Bridge. The Chicago Junction Railroad was a switching and terminal railroad that served the stockyard area and was eventually purchased by the New York Central.

At its peak the crossing involved a total of 8 tracks of the PRR, B&OCT and CR&I crossing the two tracks of the C&A. Also included in the complex were a number of hand-operated crossovers and wye tracks. Each of the 4 railroads involved in the crossing employed switchtenders on site to manage any crossover or connecting movements, with the PRR maintaining two tender stations, north and south of the crossing, to protect the two B&OCT to C&A wye tracks where they each crossed the Panhandle main line and the C&A crossing itself. Switchtender cabin "A" managed the Alton crossing and would continue to do so until the crossing was interlocked in 2007.

For both the B&OCT and PCC&StL, Brighton Park was one in a string of non-interlocked railroad crossings at grade with others at Ash Street, 26th Street and 12th Street. Maximum speed on the route was between 20 and 30 mph. Interlocking the Brighton Park crossing would have been of limited value without upgrading the entire line. As passenger traffic on the route dried up and the railroads entered financial hardship, investment in the line became less and less of a priority. With the formation of the Penn Central and later Conrail, the PCC&StL and CR&I lines through Brighton Park were united under a single railroad. The Panhandle route was ultimately abandoned with Conrail shifting traffic to the C&RI, ripping up the two Panhandle tracks, thus reducing the number of tracks crossing the Alton to 5. Under Conrail the CR&I was designated as an industrial track, its lowest classification. Since the PRR era crossing agreement with the Alton successor Illinois Central Railroad was still in effect, Conrail had little incentive to upgrade the signaling on the line.

== Modernization ==
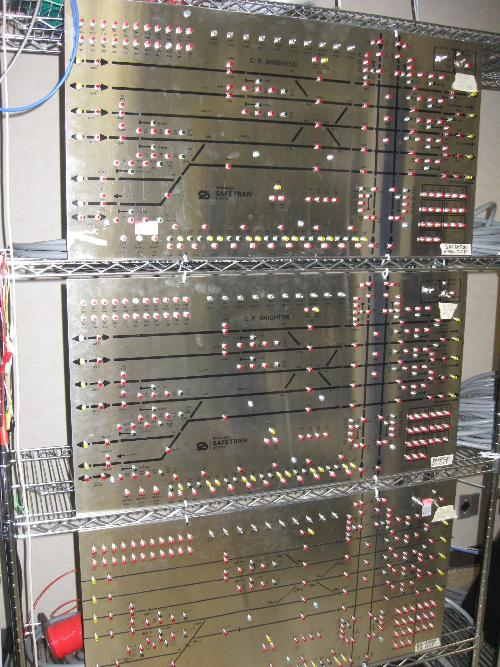
Model board showing the layout of the new Brighton Park interlocking

The modernization effort to automate the Brighton Park crossing was undertaken as part of the Chicago Region Environmental and Transportation Efficiency Program (CREATE) in 2007. It involved Safetran Systems, (part of Invensys Rail) with the crossing's application development, site mock-up, and preliminary factory testing taking place in Rancho Cucamonga, California, in an in-house project called "Brighton Park / Pershing Main". In addition to the full automation of the crossing, additional interlocked crossovers would be installed north and south, eliminating a number of hand-operated switches. This was all done in conjunction with a centralized traffic control project on both the ex-Conrail and B&OCT lines, upgrading them from dark territory and automatic block signaling respectively. Ultimately control of the new remote crossing would pass to the Norfolk Southern railroad, who had previously employed the switchtender.

== Future ==
As a part of the CREATE project, a flyover on the CN/Heritage Corridor over the Western Avenue Corridor tracks would be constructed. The flyover project would reduce congestion to the 76 freight and passenger trains that go through the diamond crossing every day. The project is currently unfunded.

Preceding station	Alton Railroad	Following station
Glenn toward St. Louis	Main Line	Halsted Street toward Chicago
Preceding station	Metra	Following station
Glenn toward Joliet	Heritage Corridor	Halsted Street toward Union Station
