= Crescent Electric Supply Co. =

American electrical hardware distributor

Crescent Electric Supply Company
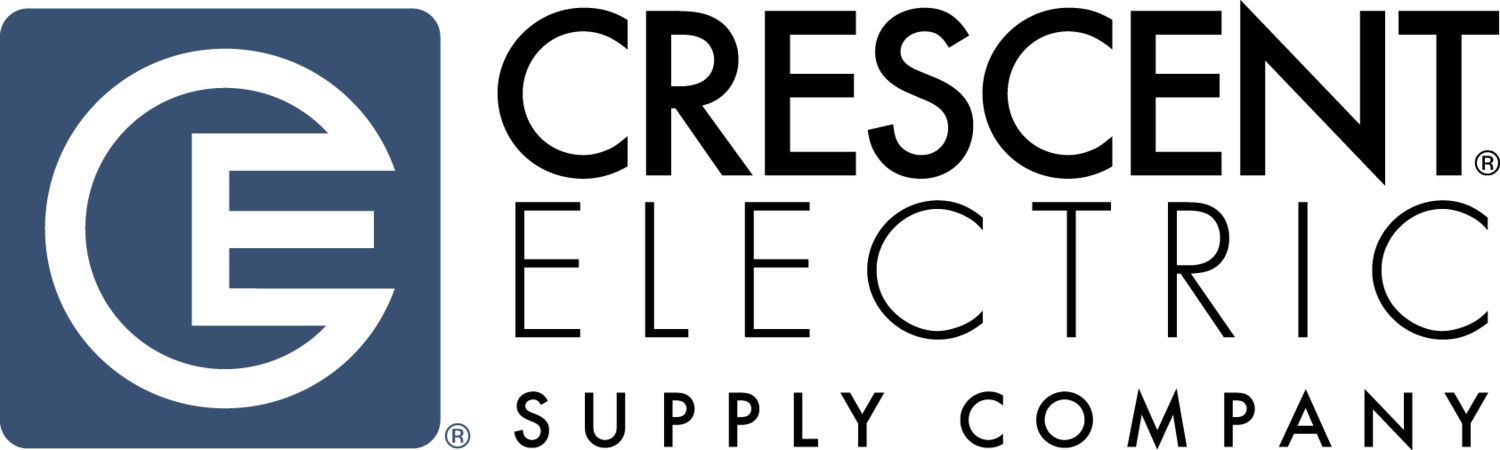
- Company type: Private
- Industry: Electric
- Founded: 1919; 107 years ago
- Founder: Titus B. Schmid
- Headquarters: East Dubuque, Illinois, United States
- Area served: United States
- Key people: Titus B Schmid (Founder); Penny Cotner (CEO and President)
- Website: www.crescentelectric.com

Crescent Electric Supply Company is an American distributor of electrical hardware. Crescent was founded in 1919 in Dubuque, Iowa, but is currently headquartered in East Dubuque, Illinois. One of the largest companies of its kind, Crescent Electric Supply was ranked by Forbes as the 435th largest privately held company in the United States in 2008.

== History ==
Electric contractor Titus B. Schmid founded Crescent Electric Supply in Dubuque, Iowa, in April 1919. Schmid believed that he could deliver goods through the river from St. Louis or Minneapolis to Dubuque faster than existing electronics manufacturers.

A 1957 article in BusinessWeek said that the company was the biggest electrical distributor in the Midwest, with eighteen warehouses in seven states (Wyoming, South Dakota, Nebraska, Minnesota, Iowa, Wisconsin, and Illinois). Crescent Electric Supply became a distributor for General Electric in 1925 and in 1957 was GE's "largest independent full-line distributor". The company grew through mergers and acquisitions, especially in the 1970s.
