= Galena Junction =

Railroad junction in Illinois, USA

Coordinates: 42°22′26″N 90°26′35″W

Galena Junction is a former railroad junction in Jo Daviess County, Illinois, United States. It is located along the BNSF Railway Aurora Subdivision. These tracks were previously built operated by the Chicago, Burlington and Quincy Railroad (CB&Q). A branch line to Galena also joined the main line at Galena Junction. West of the junction, the tracks converged into a single track bridge over the Galena River. The Chicago Great Western Railway's (CGW) main line also diverged at Galena Junction, running parallel with the CB&Q to the southeast and was jointly operated (via trackage rights) with the CB&Q to the northwest and East Dubuque. The Illinois Central's Iowa Division also joined the tracks west of Galena Junction at "Portage" interlocking. The CB&Q Galena Branch was abandoned in 1961, while the CGW line was abandoned in 1971 by predecessor Chicago and North Western Railway. The former CB&Q branch, along the east side of the Galena River, is now a rail trail.

| Preceding station | Burlington Route | Following station |
|---|---|---|
| East Dubuque toward Minneapolis | Minneapolis – Chicago | Blanding toward Chicago |
| Terminus | Galena Branch | Galena Terminus |
| Preceding station | Chicago Great Western Railway | Following station |
| East Dubuque toward Oelwein | Chicago – Oelwein | North Hanover toward Chicago |
