= East Dubuque station =

Rail station in East Dubuque, Illinois

East Dubuque, IL
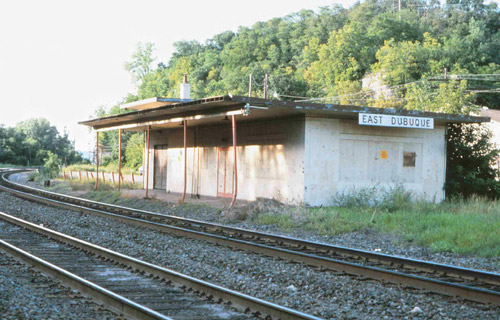
- East Dubuque station in 1992

General information
- Location: Sinsinawa Avenue, East Dubuque, Illinois 61025
- Coordinates: 42°29′38″N 90°38′48″W
- System: Inter-city rail station
- Lines: Illinois Central Gulf; Burlington Northern Railroad

History
- Opened: June 12, 1855 (Illinois Central Railroad); February 13, 1974 (Amtrak)
- Closed: April 30, 1971 (Illinois Central); September 30, 1981 (Amtrak)
- Original company: Illinois Central; Chicago, Burlington and Quincy Railroad

Former services
Preceding station	Amtrak	Following station
Dubuque Terminus	Black Hawk 1974–1981	Galena toward Chicago
Preceding station	Burlington Route	Following station
Potosi toward Minneapolis	Minneapolis – Chicago	Galena Junction toward Chicago
Preceding station	Illinois Central Railroad	Following station
Dubuque toward Sioux City	Sioux City – Chicago	East Cabin toward Chicago
Preceding station	Chicago Great Western Railway	Following station
Dubuque toward Oelwein	Chicago – Oelwein	Galena Junction toward Chicago
Location

The East Dubuque station of East Dubuque, Illinois originally served the Illinois Central Railroad and Chicago, Burlington and Quincy Railroad. Passenger service ceased upon the formation of Amtrak in 1971, but resumed between Chicago and Dubuque in 1974 under the name Black Hawk. Service ceased on September 30, 1981. The depot no longer exists.

== Bibliography ==
- Brownson, Howard Gray (1915). History of the Illinois Central Railroad to 1870. Urbana, Illinois: University of Illinois.
