= Illinois Central West Line =

Commuter line between Chicago and Addison, IL (1892-1931)

Overview
- Status: Defunct
- Owner: Illinois Central Railroad
- Locale: Chicago metropolitan area
- Termini: Randolph Street Station; Addison

Service
- Type: Commuter Rail
- Train number(s): 140, 141, 145, 146, 147, 148

History
- Opened: May 1, 1892
- Closed: 1931

Technical
- Line length: 24.12 miles (38.82 km)
- Track gauge: 4 ft 8 1/2 in (1,435 mm)

The Illinois Central West Line was a commuter rail line operated by the Illinois Central Railroad between the Randolph Street Station in Chicago and Addison, Illinois. The service began in 1892 and ended in 1931.

== History ==
The Illinois Central Railroad opened a westerly line from Chicago to Freeport, Illinois in 1891. A suburban passenger service over a portion of this line between Chicago and Addison was inaugurated on May 1, 1892. Stations were initially located at Wabash Avenue and 16th Street, Crawford Avenue, Hyman (Cicero) Avenue, Robinson (Laramie) Avenue, Ogden Avenue, Parkview Avenue, Brook View, Hill Side, and South Addison. Service consisted of three trains in each direction Monday to Saturday and two trains in each direction on Sundays. A collision between an Addison suburban train and another locomotive occurred on February 25, 1893.

On April 15, 1931, the Illinois Central Railroad asked the Illinois Commerce Commission to allow discontinuance of passenger trains over the line. Discontinuance was granted and the commuter service ended.

== Route ==
The West Line's eastern terminus was the Randolph Street Station on the east side of the Chicago Loop. From Randolph, trains traveled south over the suburban tracks of the Illinois Central's main line (still used by Metra Electric District trains). South of Roosevelt Road and Central Station, the West Line diverged from the main line between 14th and 16th Streets over a section of trackage that no longer exists that connected with what is now the Canadian National's Freeport Subdivision. From there, the trains headed west to the vicinity of the South branch of the Chicago River, where the line angled to the southwest and roughly paralleled the river. Near 35th Street, the line crossed the river and continued west. From Central Avenue, it angled northwest through suburban Cicero, Berwyn, North Riverside, Hines, Broadview, Hillside, Elmhurst, and Villa Park, before reaching Addison. At the crossing of North Avenue in Addison, the line left the Freeport Subdivision, heading north along a branch on the west side of Addison Road before terminating in the vicinity of Lake Street.

== Stations ==
County	Location	Station	Notes
Cook	Chicago	Randolph Street Station	Remains in service as part of Metra Electric Connections: IC Electric; South Shore Line
Cook	Chicago	Van Buren Street	Remains in service as part of Metra Electric Connections: IC Electric; South Shore Line
Cook	Chicago	Roosevelt Road	Remains in service as part of Metra Electric Connections: IC Electric; South Shore Line; Intercity trains at Central Station
Cook	Chicago	Wabash Avenue and 16th Street	Closed
Cook	Chicago	Halsted Street	Closed
Cook	Chicago	Lawndale Avenue	Closed
Cook	Chicago	Crawford Avenue	Flag stop, Closed
Cook	Cicero	Hyman Avenue	Flag stop, Closed
Cook	Cicero	Hawthorne	Closed
Cook	Cicero	Ogden Avenue	Flag stop, Closed
Cook	Berwyn	Berwyn	Flag stop, Closed
Cook	North Riverside	Parkway	Flag stop, Closed
Cook	North Riverside	North Riverside	Flag stop, Closed
Cook	North Riverside	Tuxedo Park	Flag stop, Closed
Cook	Hines	Speedway	Flag stop, Closed Points of interest: Speedway Park
Cook	Hines	Hines	Closed Points of interest: Hines Hospital
Cook	Broadview	Broadview	Closed
Cook	Hillside	Oakridge	Flag stop, Closed Points of interest: Oakridge Cemetery
Cook	Hillside	Hillside	Closed
Du Page	Elmhurst	Elmhurst	Later reconstructed for Amtrak service, Closed
Du Page	Elmhurst	St. Charles Road	Flag stop, Closed
Du Page	Villa Park	Suburb Hill	Flag stop, Closed
Du Page	Addison	South Addison	Closed
Du Page	Addison	Addison	Closed
