= East Dubuque School =

- U.S. National Register of Historic Places
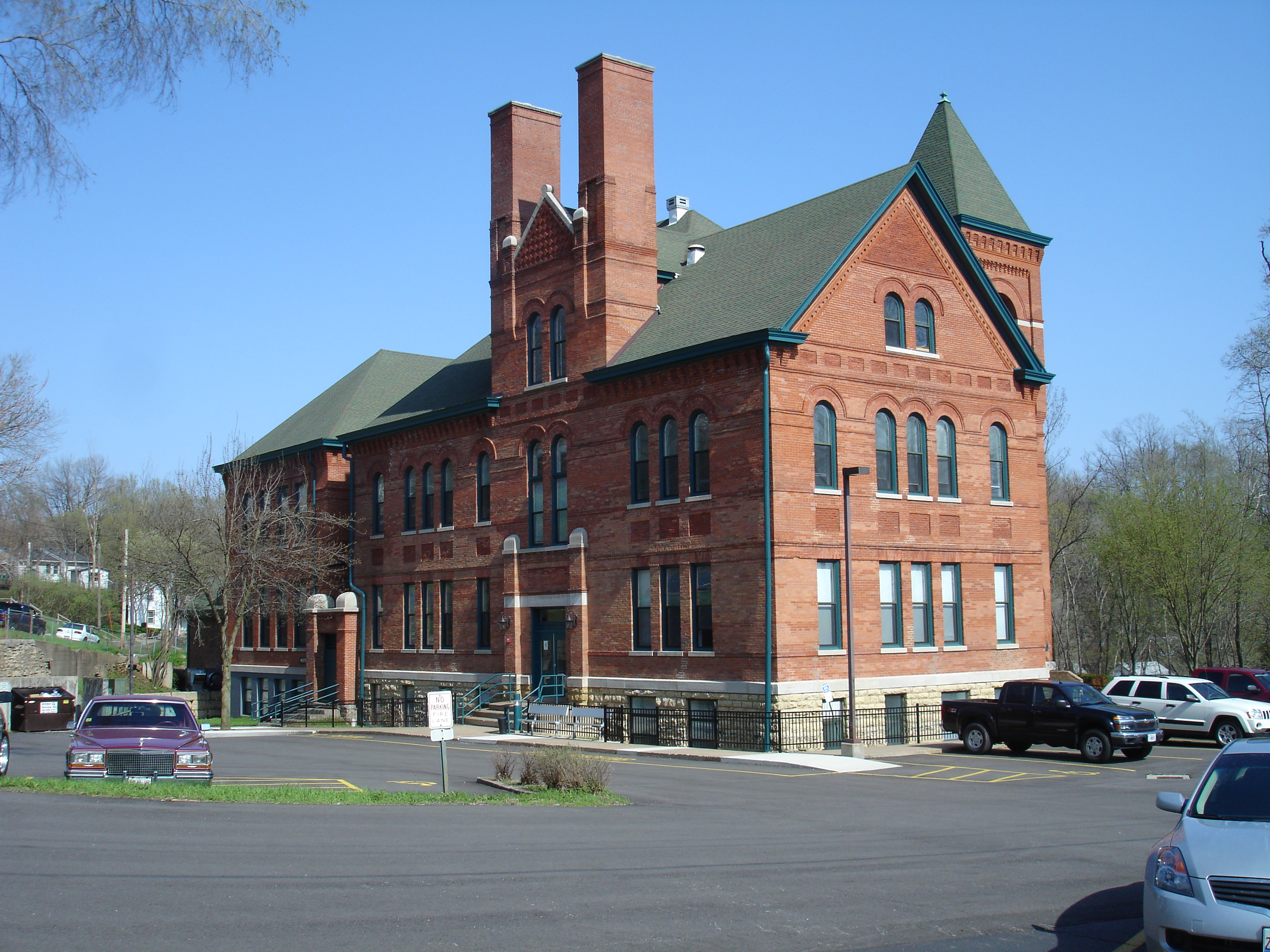

- Location within Illinois Location within the United States
- Location: Montgomery Ave., East Dubuque, Illinois
- Coordinates: 42°29′38″N 90°38′29″W
- Area: 1.4 acres (0.57 ha)
- Built: 1893, 1914
- Architect: Thomas T. Carkeek
- Architectural style: Romanesque Revival
- NRHP reference No.: 82000396
- Added to NRHP: November 12, 1982

The East Dubuque School, also known as the Ahva Living of East Dubuque, is a historic Romanesque Revival school building in the Mississippi River city of East Dubuque, Illinois, United States. It was constructed in two sections, one in 1893, the other in 1914 and designed by local architect Thomas Carkeek. The building was listed on the U.S. National Register of Historic Places in 1982.

== History ==
The East Dubuque School was constructed in two separate sections, the first, in 1893, consisted of a two-story rectangular structure and its three-story bell tower. The building sits on a limestone foundation and is built from brick of varying shades which give the structure an overall mottled appearance. The second section of the building was constructed in 1914 and consisted of a 36 by 68-foot (21 m) wing, known as the "east wing".

== Architecture ==
The East Dubuque School building sits on a prominent bluff overlooking the city of East Dubuque. The building is in the Romanesque Revival style and was designed by a prominent 1890s Dubuque architect, Thomas Carkeek.

== Historic significance ==
The building played a key role in public education in East Dubuque (formerly Dunleith) and has stood as a landmark in the city for more than 100 years. East Dubuque School possesses a high level of architectural integrity and is a good example of a school in Illinois cast in Romanesque Revival style. The U.S. National Register of Historic Places approved the listing of the East Dubuque School on November 12, 1982.
