= Dubuque Rail Bridge =

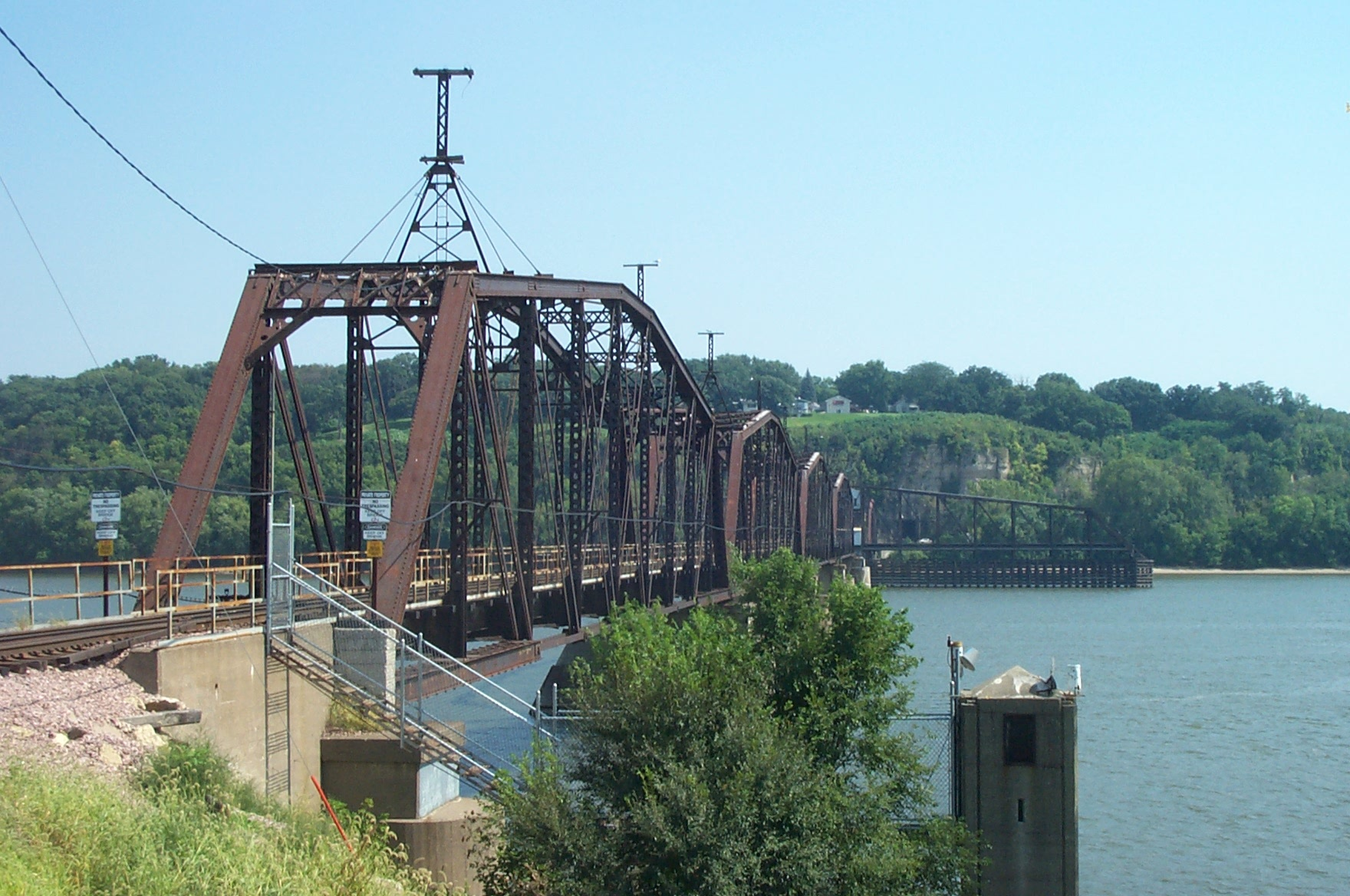
- The Dubuque Railroad Bridge.
- Coordinates: 42°29′55″N 90°39′01″W
- Carries: Single rail track
- Crosses: Mississippi River
- Locale: Dubuque, Iowa and East Dubuque, Illinois
- Maintained by: Canadian National Railway

Characteristics
- Design: Truss Bridge with Swing-span

History
- Opened: December 1868

The Dubuque Rail Bridge carries a single rail line across the Mississippi River between Dubuque, Iowa, and East Dubuque, Illinois, near river mile 580. It is currently operated by Canadian National Railway as a result of their 1999 purchase of Illinois Central Railroad.

== History ==
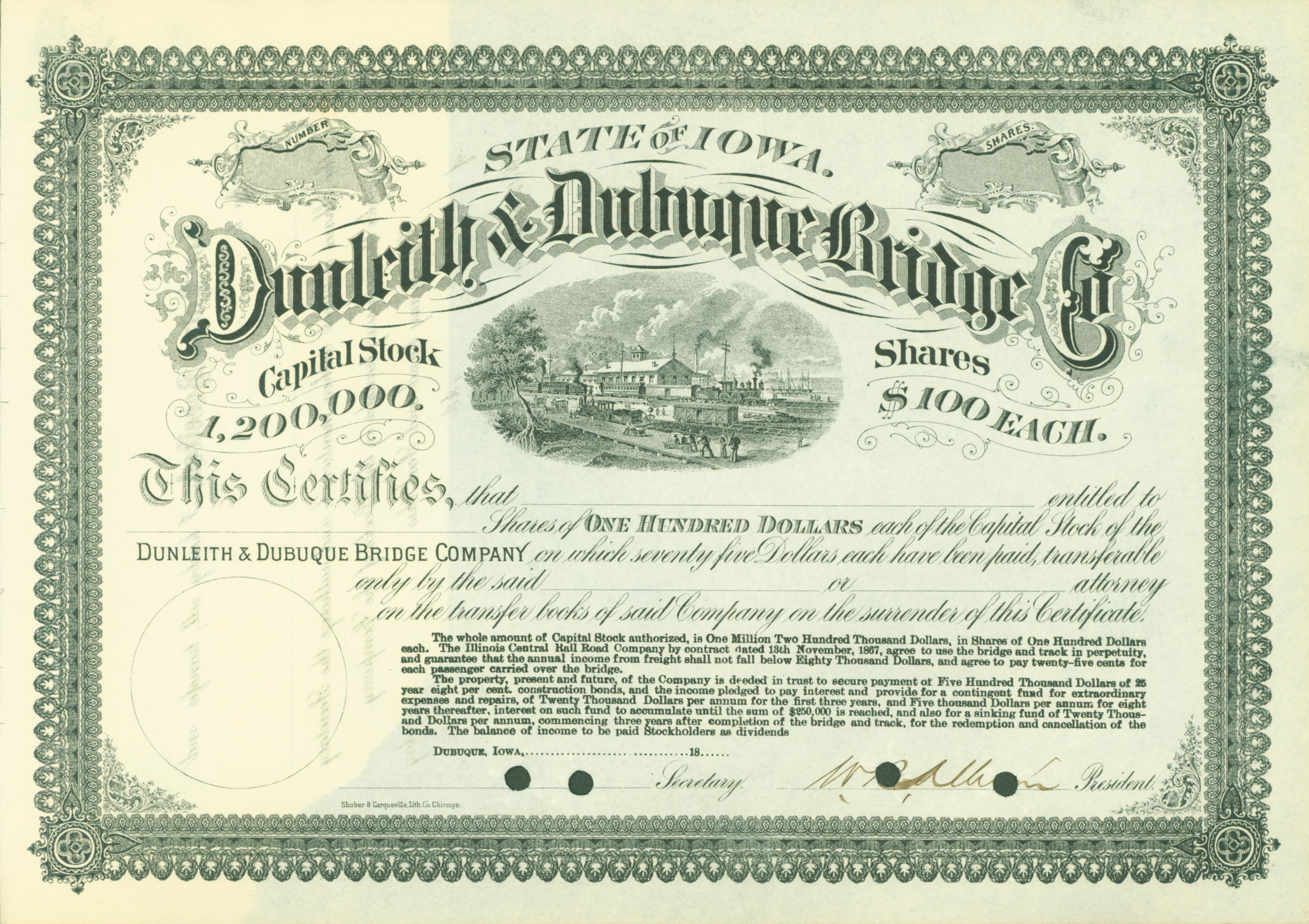
Share of the Dunleith & Dubuque Bridge Co., unissued

The original swing bridge was constructed by Andrew Carnegie and operated by the Dunleith & Dubuque Bridge Company. Going into service in December 1868, it primarily was used by the Illinois Central Railroad. It was rebuilt in the 1890s.

The current Dubuque Rail Bridge has 5 spans and a swing-span. It has been altered somewhat over the years, with last rehabilitation in 2012, but so far has retained the fixed center pier.

== Operation ==
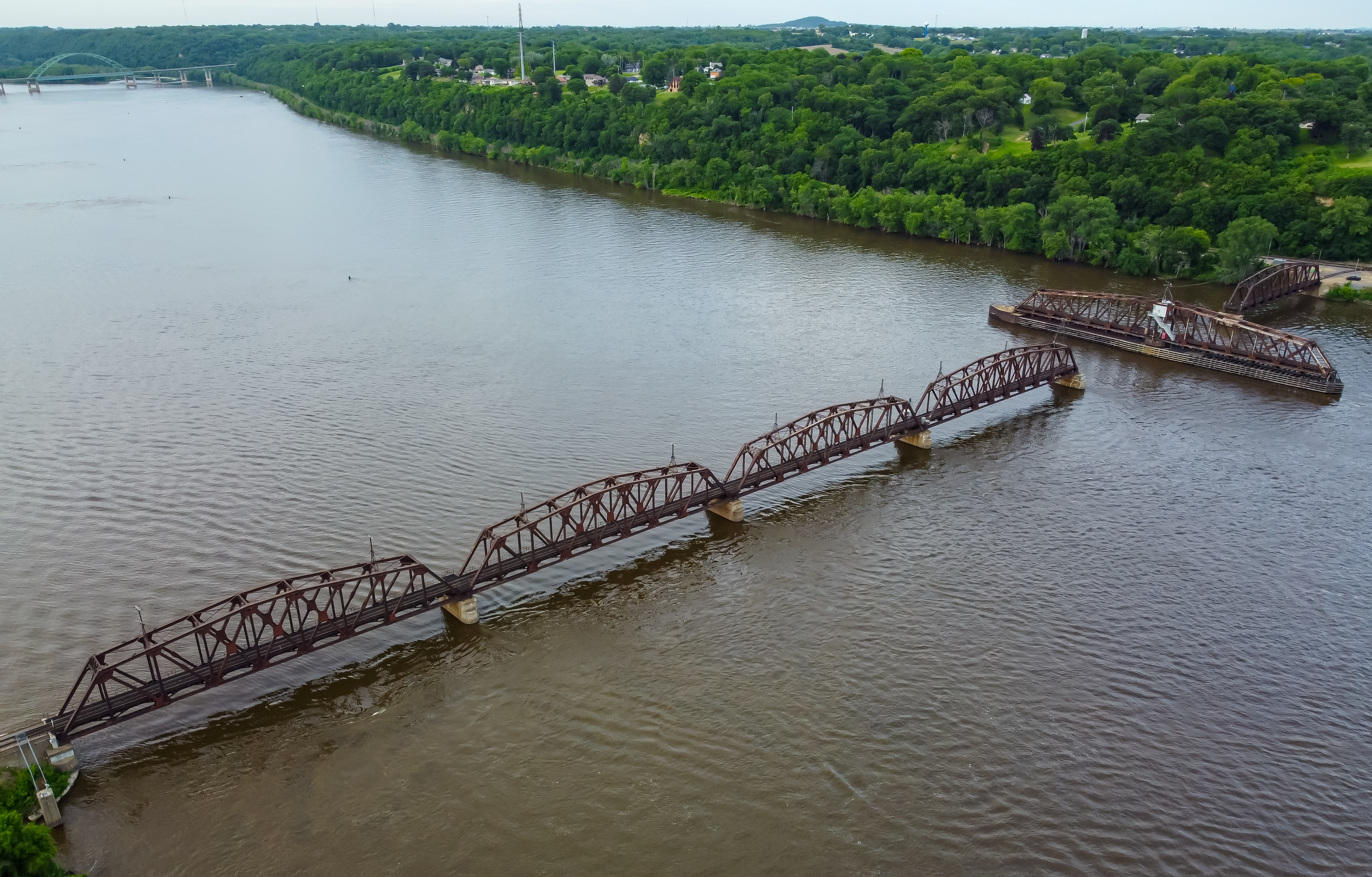
Dubuque rail bridge

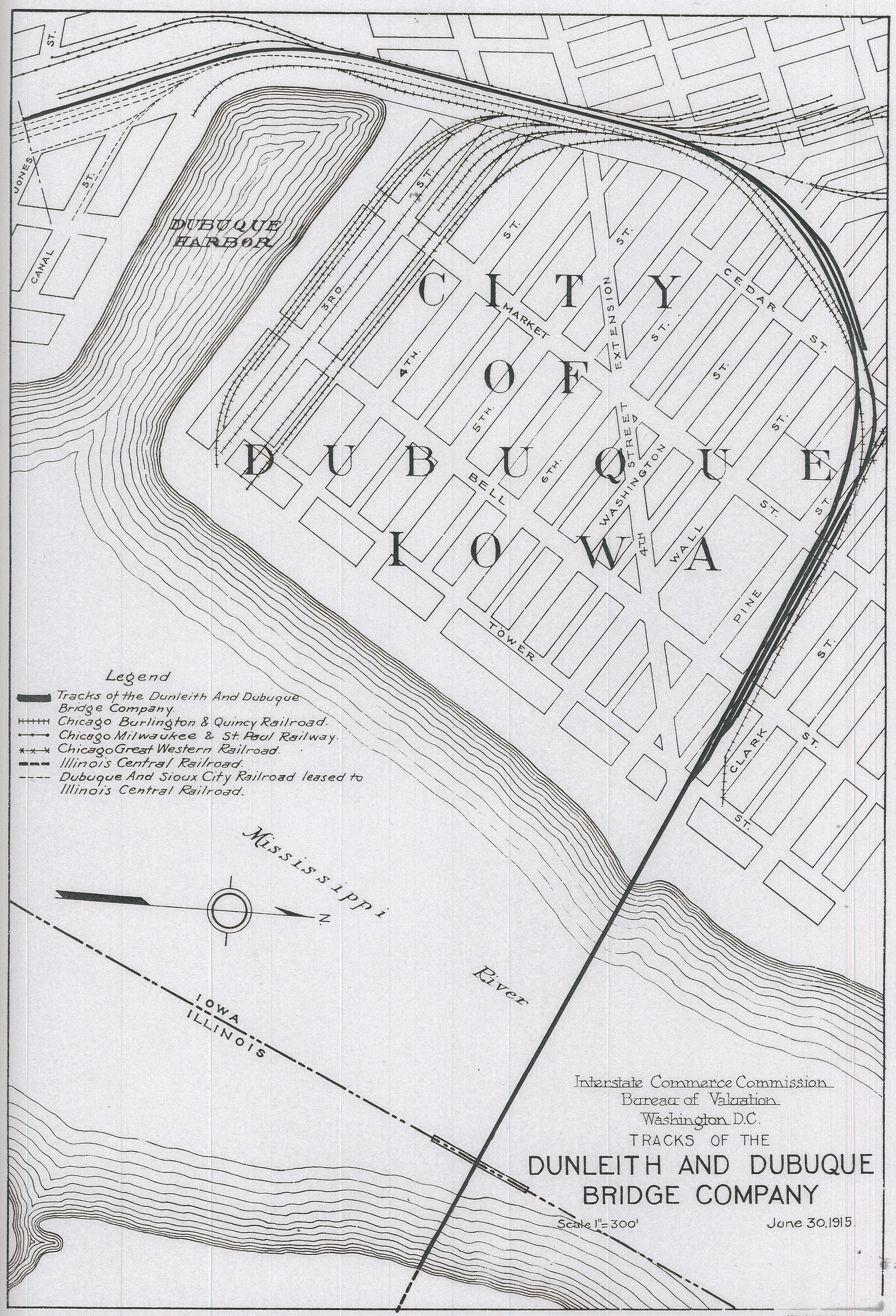
1915 map of the Dunleith and Dubuque Bridge Company

Because of a 150-foot (46 m) bluff very close to the Mississippi riverbank on the Illinois side, about 1/2 mile south of the bridge the approaching railroad track diverges away from the main tracks (and the river) to enter a 1/4-mile tunnel, which then curves about 90-degrees so the bridge track can cross the continuing tracks running adjacent to the river.

== See also ==
- List of crossings of the Upper Mississippi River
