= Chicago station =

Chicago station may refer to:

- Chicago Union Station
- Chicago Bus Station
- Chicago station (CTA Red Line)
- Chicago station (CTA Blue Line)
- Chicago station (CTA Brown and Purple Lines)
- Chicago station (CTA Logan Square branch)

Other intercity passenger terminals in Chicago include:

- Central Station (Chicago terminal)
- Dearborn Station
- Grand Central Station (Chicago)
- Great Central Station
- LaSalle Street Station
- Millennium Station
- Ogilvie Transportation Center
- Wells Street Station
- Wells Street Terminal
