= Dubuque station =

Rail station in Dubuque, Iowa, US

Dubuque, IA
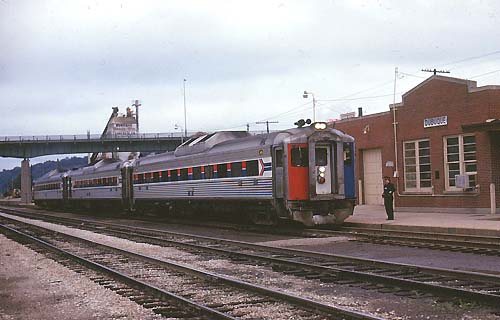
- The Black Hawk at Dubuque station in 1975

General information
- Location: Iowa and Jones Streets, Dubuque, Iowa
- Coordinates: 42.4931°N 90.6613°W
- Line: Illinois Central Gulf
- Platforms: 1 side platform

History
- Opened: February 13, 1974 (Amtrak)
- Closed: April 30, 1971 (Illinois Central); September 30, 1981 (Amtrak)
- Original company: Illinois Central

Former services
Preceding station	Amtrak	Following station
Terminus	Black Hawk 1974–1981	East Dubuque toward Chicago
Preceding station	Illinois Central Railroad	Following station
Peosta toward Sioux City	Sioux City – Chicago	East Dubuque toward Chicago
Location

Dubuque station was a train station in Dubuque, Iowa. It originally served the Illinois Central Railroad. In 1917, the site was considered for creating a Union station in Dubuque. However, no such plan transpired and each railroad continued to use separate depots. Over the years, the station hosted the Illinois Central's Hawkeye, Iowan, and Land O'Corn trains. Passenger service ceased upon the formation of Amtrak in 1971, but resumed between Chicago and Dubuque in 1974 under the name Black Hawk. Service ceased on September 30, 1981. A proposed revival of the service seeks to use the Dubuque Intermodal Transportation Center as its terminal.
