= East Dubuque, Illinois =

East Dubuque
- City
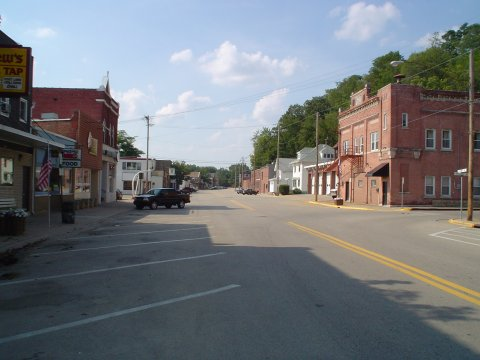
- Downtown East Dubuque, along Sinsinawa Avenue

- Flag Logo

- Location of East Dubuque in Jo Daviess County, Illinois.
- Coordinates: 42°29′28″N 90°37′28″W
- Country: United States
- State: Illinois
- County: Jo Daviess
- Township: Dunleith

Area
  - Total: 2.81 sq mi (7.29 km^{2})
  - Land: 2.7 sq mi (7.1 km^{2})
  - Water: 0.073 sq mi (0.19 km^{2})
- Elevation: 722 ft (220 m)

Population (2020)
  - Total: 1,505
  - Density: 548.9/sq mi (211.94/km^{2})
- Time zone: UTC-6 (CST)
  - Summer (DST): UTC-5 (CDT)
- ZIP Code(s): 61025
- Area code: 815
- FIPS code: 17-21683
- GNIS ID: 2394598
- Website: www.cityofeastdubuque.com

East Dubuque is a city in Jo Daviess County, Illinois, United States. The population was 1,505 at the 2020 census, down from 1,704 in 2010. East Dubuque is located alongside the Mississippi River. Across the river is the city of Dubuque, Iowa. The city limits extend along the river to the Illinois-Wisconsin border.

== History ==
East Dubuque was originally called Dunleith, and under the latter name was platted in 1853. The present name comes from the city's location east of Dubuque. A post office was established at Dunleith in 1854, and the post office was renamed East Dubuque in 1879.

== Geography ==
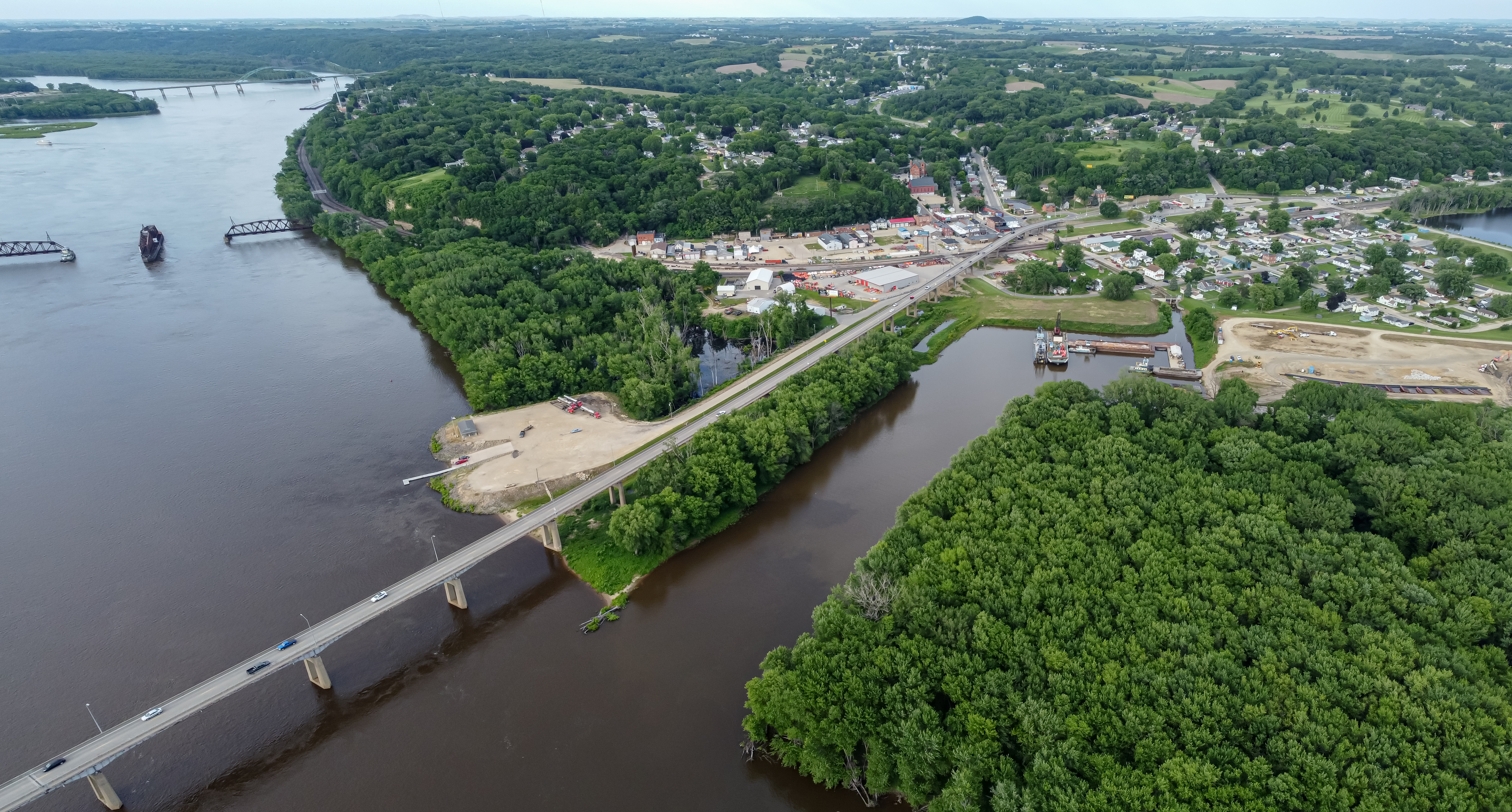
Julien Dubuque Bridge Dubuque Rail Bridge crossing the Mississippi into East Dubuque

According to the 2021 census gazetteer files, East Dubuque has a total area of 2.81 square miles (7.28 km^{2}), of which 2.74 square miles (7.10 km^{2}) (or 97.44%) is land and 0.07 square miles (0.18 km^{2}) (or 2.56%) is water.

Like the rest of Jo Daviess County, the city is topographically a part of the Driftless Area.

=== Prominent landmarks ===
- East Dubuque School
- Julien Dubuque Bridge
- Dunlieth Mounds

== Demographics ==
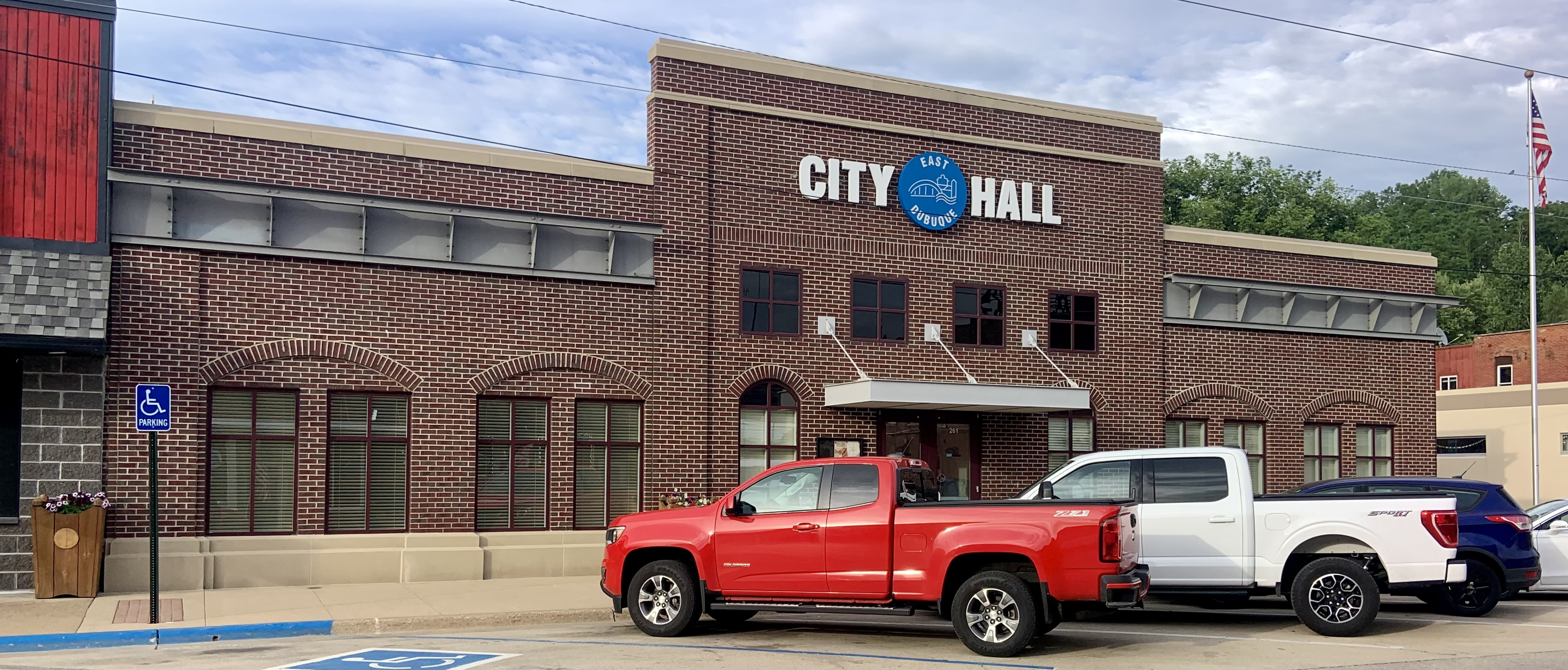
East Dubuque City Hall

Historical population
Census	Pop.	Note	%±
1880	1,037		—
1890	1,069		3.1%
1900	1,146		7.2%
1910	1,253		9.3%
1920	1,163		−7.2%
1930	1,395		19.9%
1940	1,475		5.7%
1950	1,697		15.1%
1960	2,082		22.7%
1970	2,408		15.7%
1980	2,194		−8.9%
1990	1,914		−12.8%
2000	1,995		4.2%
2010	1,704		−14.6%
2020	1,505		−11.7%
U.S. Decennial Census

=== 2020 census ===
As of the 2020 census, East Dubuque had a population of 1,505. The median age was 44.9 years. 20.1% of residents were under the age of 18 and 24.1% of residents were 65 years of age or older. For every 100 females there were 98.5 males, and for every 100 females age 18 and over there were 96.1 males age 18 and over.

81.9% of residents lived in urban areas, while 18.1% lived in rural areas.

There were 701 households and 426 families residing in the city. Of all households, 23.3% had children under the age of 18 living in them, 36.5% were married-couple households, 26.0% were households with a male householder and no spouse or partner present, and 31.2% were households with a female householder and no spouse or partner present. About 42.5% of all households were made up of individuals and 19.2% had someone living alone who was 65 years of age or older.

The population density was 534.83 inhabitants per square mile (206.50/km^{2}). There were 771 housing units at an average density of 273.99 per square mile (105.79/km^{2}).

There were 771 housing units, of which 9.1% were vacant. The homeowner vacancy rate was 1.0% and the rental vacancy rate was 9.8%.

Racial composition as of the 2020 census
Race	Number	Percent
White	1,392	92.5%
Black or African American	19	1.3%
American Indian and Alaska Native	3	0.2%
Asian	5	0.3%
Native Hawaiian and Other Pacific Islander	4	0.3%
Some other race	20	1.3%
Two or more races	62	4.1%
Hispanic or Latino (of any race)	35	2.3%

=== Income and poverty ===
The median income for a household in the city was $52,500, and the median income for a family was $72,500. Males had a median income of $41,357 versus $30,607 for females. The per capita income for the city was $30,587. About 7.5% of families and 12.5% of the population were below the poverty line, including 21.1% of those under age 18 and 3.6% of those age 65 or over.

== Transportation ==
The main roads in East Dubuque are Sinsinawa Avenue and U.S. Route 20 (Wall Street). The Julien Dubuque Bridge serves as the connection between East Dubuque and Dubuque. Illinois Route 35 serves as the primary connection between East Dubuque and Wisconsin. The East Dubuque station previously provided another transportation choice for residents of East Dubuque.

== Notable people ==
- Arthur Joseph O'Neill, Roman Catholic bishop
