= Freeport Subdivision =

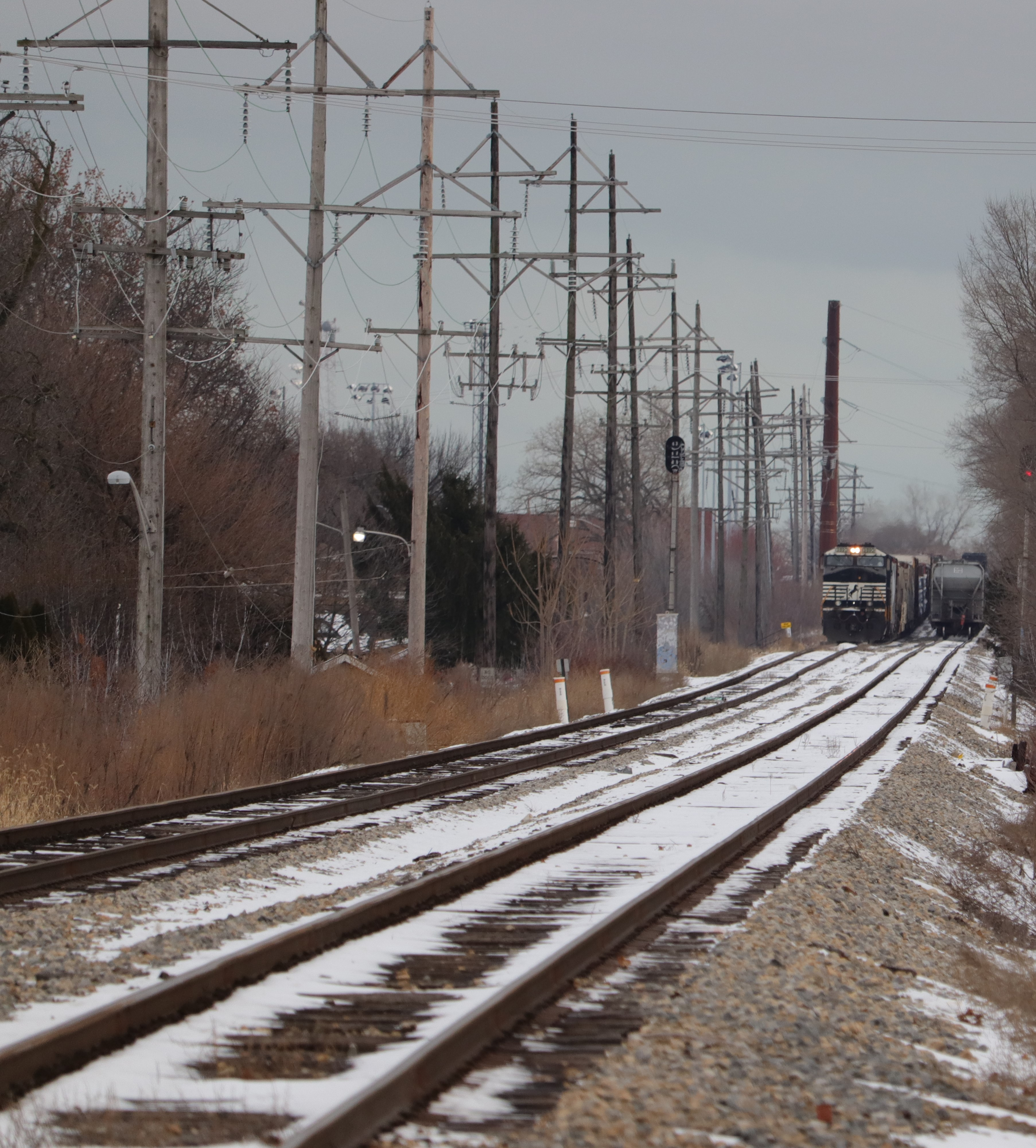
- The Freeport Subdivision as seen from Berwyn, Illinois

Overview
- Owner: Canadian National Railway
- Locale: Illinois
- Termini: Chicago; Freeport

Service
- Type: Freight rail

History
- Opened: 1891

Technical
- Line length: 113.5 mi (182.7 km)
- Number of tracks: 1-2
- Track gauge: 4 ft 8 1/2 in (1,435 mm) standard gauge
- Operating speed: 50 mph (80 km/h)

The Freeport Subdivision is a railroad line in Illinois which runs from 16th Street in downtown Chicago to Freeport, Illinois. It is owned and operated by the Canadian National Railway (CN). As of 2016 the line is almost exclusively freight-only, with only a small segment within Chicago, between 21st Street in Chinatown and Ashland Avenue in Bridgeport, hosting Amtrak and Metra passenger trains.

The line is 113.5 miles (182.7 km) long. At its east end it joins with the St. Charles Air Line and the Chicago Subdivision in Chicago's South Loop. From there to the interchange with the Indiana Harbor Belt Railroad in Broadview, Illinois, it is double-tracked and CTC-controlled. From Broadview to Freeport, Illinois, it is single-tracked and controlled by CTC. The maximum speed over the line is 50 miles per hour (80 km/h). The section between 16th Street and 21st Street mostly handles traffic between CN's Chicago yards; Amtrak trains such as the City of New Orleans, Illini, and Saluki also use it when the St. Charles Air Line is out of service.

The Illinois Central Railroad opened its line between Chicago and Freeport in 1891, giving it a direct route between Chicago and Iowa. The Illinois Central Gulf Railroad, successor to the Illinois Central, sold the line between Hawthorne Yard in Cicero, Illinois, and Freeport (and on to Iowa) in 1985 to the Chicago Central and Pacific Railroad. The Illinois Central, after dropping the "Gulf" portion of its name in the late 1980s, reacquired the route in 1996. The IC operated the Illinois Central West Line on this subdivision in 1892 before discontinuing it in 1931. It also operated passenger trains on the subdivision until the startup of Amtrak on May 1, 1971; Amtrak did not retain the Chicago–Sioux City, Iowa, Hawkeye. Passenger service returned on February 14, 1974, with the introduction of the Black Hawk between Chicago and Dubuque, Iowa. This service ended on September 30, 1981.
