= Land O'Corn =

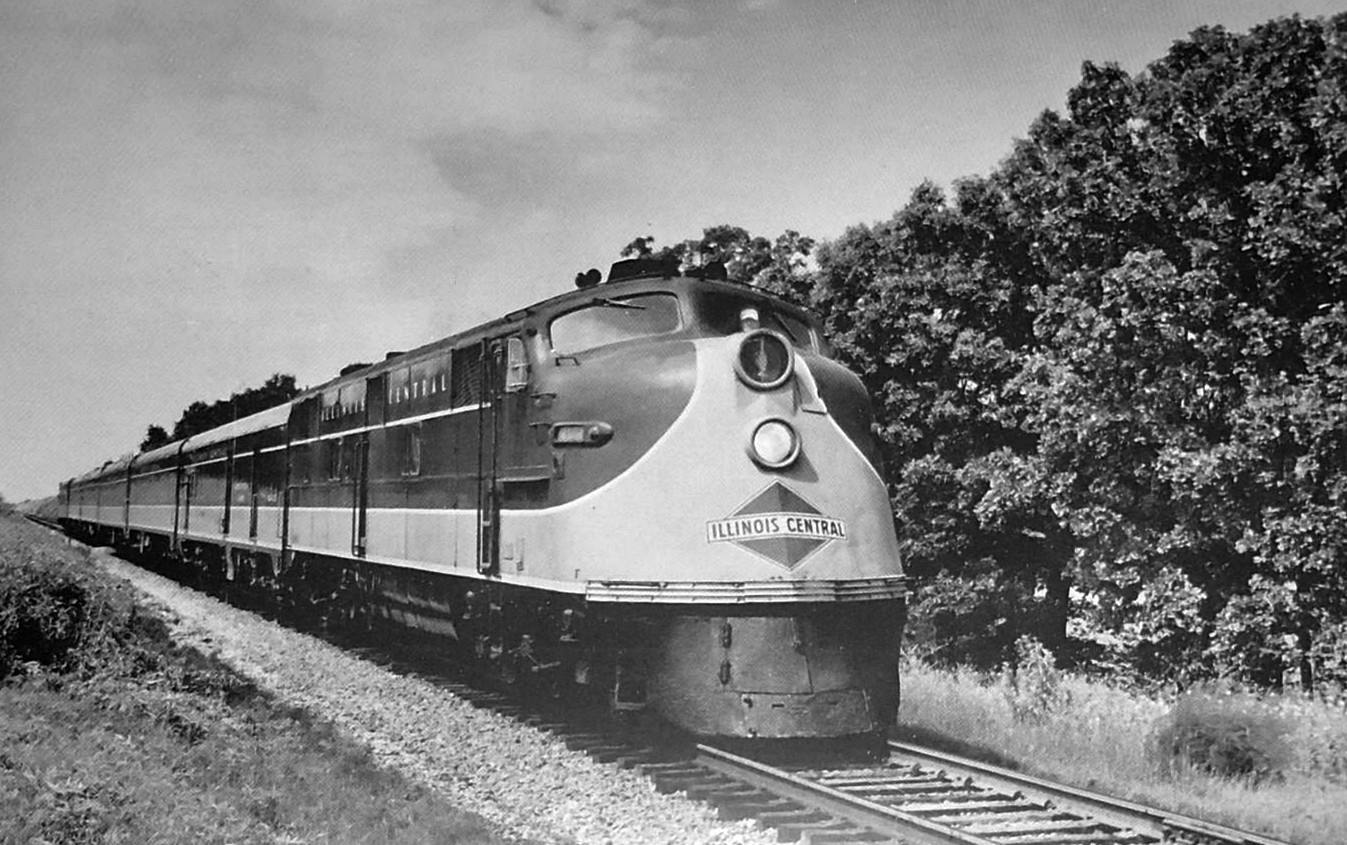
- The Land O'Corn after receiving conventional lightweight equipment.

Overview
- Locale: Midwestern United States
- First service: October 26, 1941
- Last service: August 5, 1967
- Former operator(s): Illinois Central Railroad

Route
- Distance travelled: 275.1 mi (442.7 km)
- Train number(s): Westbound: 13; eastbound: 14

On-board services
- Seating arrangements: Coaches
- Catering facilities: Diner-lounge

The Land O'Corn was a streamlined passenger train operated by the Illinois Central Railroad between Chicago, Illinois, and Waterloo, Iowa, from 1941 until 1967. Its inception was due in no small part to John W. Rath of Ackley, IA and part owner of the Rath Packing Co. of Waterloo, Iowa as well as a member of the Illinois Central's board of directors. It featured a wide range of equipment over its existence, including self-propelled Motorailers and steam locomotives, before finally adopting conventional diesel locomotives and lightweight cars. The Illinois Central discontinued the Land O'Corn in 1967; Amtrak later operated the Black Hawk over part of its route.

== History ==
Initially the Illinois Central used self-propelled "Motorailers" manufactured by the American Car and Foundry Company. The Motorailer was a two-unit diesel multiple unit with a top speed of 83 miles per hour (134 km/h). Both units were powered; the driving car had two engines and the trailer one. Each engine was rated at 225 horsepower (168 kW). The lead car seated 70 while the rear car seated 39 for a total capacity of 109. The rear car included a coffee shop/cafe with limited seating. Unusually, the engineer sat in the open at the front of the driving car. Each car was 75 feet (23 m) long.

The Motorailer-equipped Land O'Corn made its first run between Chicago and Waterloo on October 26, 1941. In February 1942 a collision with a beer truck wrecked the Motorailer and killed the engineer. Material shortages caused by World War II prevented ACF from building a replacement so the Illinois Central began operating regular steam-pulled coaches over the schedule. The Illinois Central re-equipped the Land O'Corn with diesel-pulled lightweight equipment on February 12, 1947, although steam engines continued to substitute well into the 1950s. The train's new consist was four 56-seat lightweight coaches built by Pullman-Standard (part of a larger order which reequipped the City of New Orleans and Green Diamond) and a heavyweight cafe/lounge. An EMD E7 headed up the train.

The Land O'Corn made the Waterloo–Chicago run in 5.5 hours (lengthening to 6-6.5 hours by the mid-1960s), departing Waterloo in the morning and returning in the evening. A standard consist in the diesel era was three coaches and a cafe. The Land O'Corn continued operating into the 1960s as the counterpart to the overnight Hawkeye, which continued west to Sioux City, Iowa. The Illinois Central discontinued the Land O'Corn on August 5, 1967.

Amtrak revived service over part of the Land O'Corn's route 1974–1981 when it operated a train between Chicago and Dubuque, Iowa. Amtrak proposed naming this train the Land O'Corn, but Illinois (which funded the service) preferred a more Illinois-centric name, so Amtrak named it the Black Hawk.
