= Black Hawk (Amtrak train) =

Former Amtrak intercity rail service

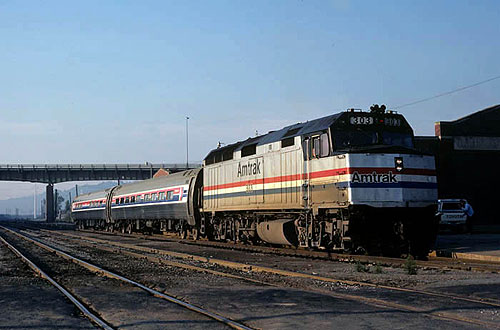
- The Black Hawk at Dubuque in 1981

Overview
- Service type: Inter-city rail
- Status: Discontinued
- Locale: Illinois, Iowa
- Predecessor: Land O'Corn
- First service: February 13, 1974
- Last service: September 30, 1981
- Successor: Rockford Intercity Passenger Rail (proposed)
- Former operator: Amtrak

Route
- Termini: Chicago, Illinois; Dubuque, Iowa
- Stops: 6
- Distance travelled: 182 miles (293 km)
- Average journey time: 4 hours 10 minutes
- Service frequency: Daily
- Train number: 370-372

On-board services
- Class: Unreserved coach
- Catering facilities: On-board cafe

Technical
- Track gauge: 4 ft 8 1/2 in (1,435 mm)
- Track owner: Chicago Central (CN)

The Black Hawk was an Amtrak passenger train service that operated from 1974 to 1981 between Chicago, Illinois, and Dubuque, Iowa, via Rockford, Illinois. The original Black Hawk operated over the Illinois Central route, now the Canadian National's Chicago Central/Iowa Zone.

From 2010 to 2014, plans called for the restored route to follow the same corridor; however, the state government could not come to an agreement with the railroad. Instead, the route would follow Metra's Milwaukee District West Line from Union Station to Big Timber Road, then the Union Pacific Railroad to Rockford. Restored service to Rockford was planned to begin in 2015, but was put on hold by Illinois Governor Bruce Rauner. An extension to Dubuque was to open at a later date.

The Rockford service was later funded in 2019 with the support of Governor J.B. Pritzker. In July 2023, Pritzker announced that two round trips a day between Chicago and Rockford would begin by 2027, with the service operated by Metra as Rockford Intercity Passenger Rail rather than by Amtrak.

== History ==
=== Previous operation ===
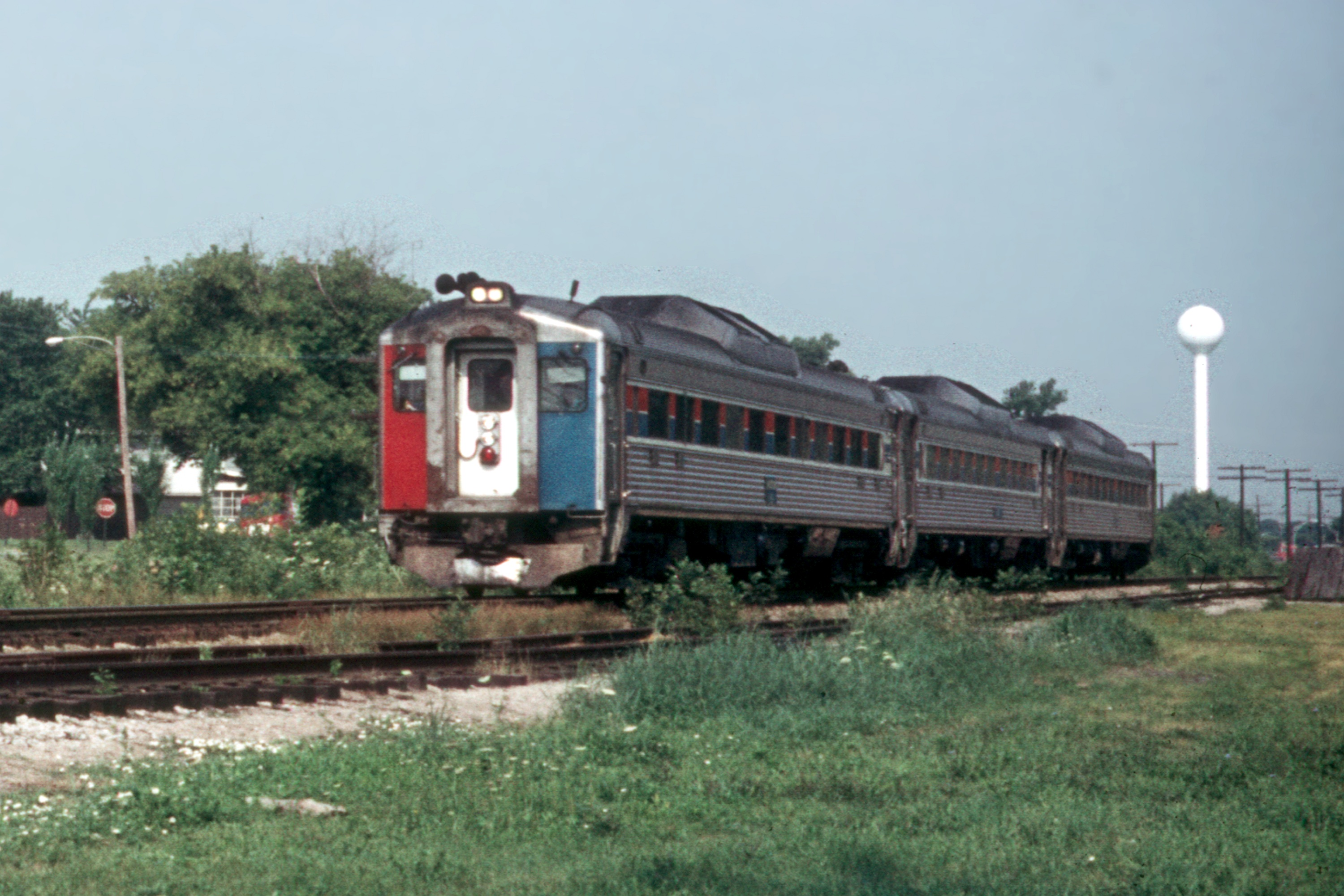
Amtrak Black Hawk in Hillside, July 1975

Prior to Amtrak, the Illinois Central Railroad operated the Land O'Corn between Chicago and Waterloo, Iowa, discontinuing it in 1967. Addition of a Chicago–Dubuque service was part of a 1973 state transportation bill, which also funded the addition of the Illini and Saluki and State House plus continued operation of the Illinois Zephyr and Carl Sandburg and two Rock Island trains.

The first Black Hawk began running on February 13, 1974, using Budd Rail Diesel Cars (RDCs). Conventional diesel locomotives and coaches replaced the RDCs after February 2, 1976. Equipment varied, including ex-Chicago & North Western gallery cars, dome cars, boat-tailed observation cars, full diners, lunch counter diners and ex-ATSF Hi-Level Coaches. Further, power for the Black Hawk also varied on a regular basis with GE P30CHs, EMD SDP40Fs, EMD F40PHs and the occasional Illinois Central Gulf "Geep" filling in for ailing motive power (an ICG EMD GP10 towed the last RDC consist into Chicago in 1976). Amfleet coaches arrived in November 1976. The Black Hawk ceased on September 30, 1981, after Illinois reduced its appropriations for passenger service.

Several Rockford based groups sponsored special charter trips on the Black Hawk to Chicago events such as Chicago Bears, Chicago Cubs and Chicago White Sox games as well as performances of "The Ice Capades". On these trips, the consists could swell to as many as seven to ten cars. During the RDC days, the usual consist consisted of three RDCs. During the mid-to-late 1970s the consist usually included three cars, including a food service car of one type or another. During a good part of the summer of 1977, the Black Hawk ran with a full dining car and dome coaches.

The route used the former Illinois Central Railroad route (then part of the Illinois Central Gulf) between Chicago's Union Station and Bridgeport and the Freeport Subdivision west of Bridgeport.

=== Restoration ===
In 2007, Amtrak, at the state of Illinois' request, conducted a feasibility study to reinstate the Black Hawk route to Rockford and Dubuque. Initial capital costs ranged from $32 million to $55 million, depending on the route. Once in operation, the service would require roughly $5 million a year in subsidies from the state. On December 10, 2010, the Illinois Department of Transportation (IDOT) announced that service would begin in 2014. The route would use the trackage of the Chicago Central and Pacific Railroad, itself owned by the Canadian National Railway. This would have been the only Illinois Service train not running along a Metra line. IDOT confirmed the return of the "Black Hawk" name in 2012.

The equipment to be used on the route was to be the Next Generation Bi-Level Passenger Rail Car built by Nippon Sharyo at a new plant in Rochelle, Illinois, which is located just 24 miles (39 km) south of a portion of the proposed route. However, when one of the first cars manufactured failed a critical safety test the contract was canceled and the plant never fully opened. The equipment will instead be single level Siemens Venture cars built at its plant in Sacramento, California, similar to cars supplied to Brightline for its services in Florida.

In April 2014, Governor Pat Quinn announced a $223 million investment to begin service as far as Rockford by 2015. After two years of negotiations, IDOT had been unable to reach a deal with Canadian National to use their lines. Instead, the train would take Metra's Milwaukee District West Line and Union Pacific tracks through Elgin, Huntley, and Belvidere before terminating in Rockford. This would require construction of a connecting track between the two lines near Big Timber Road station. IDOT planned to continue working with the CN to eventually extend the route to Dubuque. In February 2015, Governor Bruce Rauner announced that development of the route would be put on hold until further notice, as the state did not have sufficient funds to continue the project. $3 million had been spent out of the $223 million plan. Huntley, Illinois, had spent over $50,000 to build a station platform.

In July 2019, the state legislature passed a new transportation bill supported by Governor J. B. Pritzker, in which $275 million was appropriated to begin service to Rockford. IDOT hired WSP as the project manager in September 2020, with the intent to begin engineering and environmental analysis. In its 2020–2025 service plan, Amtrak forecasted that the Chicago–Rockford route would begin in fiscal year 2025 and attract 136,900 riders that year. In 2021, amid a push by the Biden administration to pass an infrastructure bill, Amtrak included two daily trains to Rockford in its 15-year expansion vision. The document lists a one-way trip time of 1 hour 51 minutes and includes an additional stop at Roselle station. In November 2021, Congress passed the Infrastructure Investment and Jobs Act, which includes $4 billion for public transportation in Illinois. While initial Black Hawk service had already been funded, local Democratic State Senator Steve Stadelman said, "maybe with this additional funding we can speed up the project."

On July 6, 2023, Illinois Governor J. B. Pritzker announced that the service would be operated by Metra. The service, planned to start operating in late 2027, will consist of two trains a day. Travel time is expected to take just under two hours.
