= Union Station (Washington Metro) =

Metro rail station in Washington, D.C.

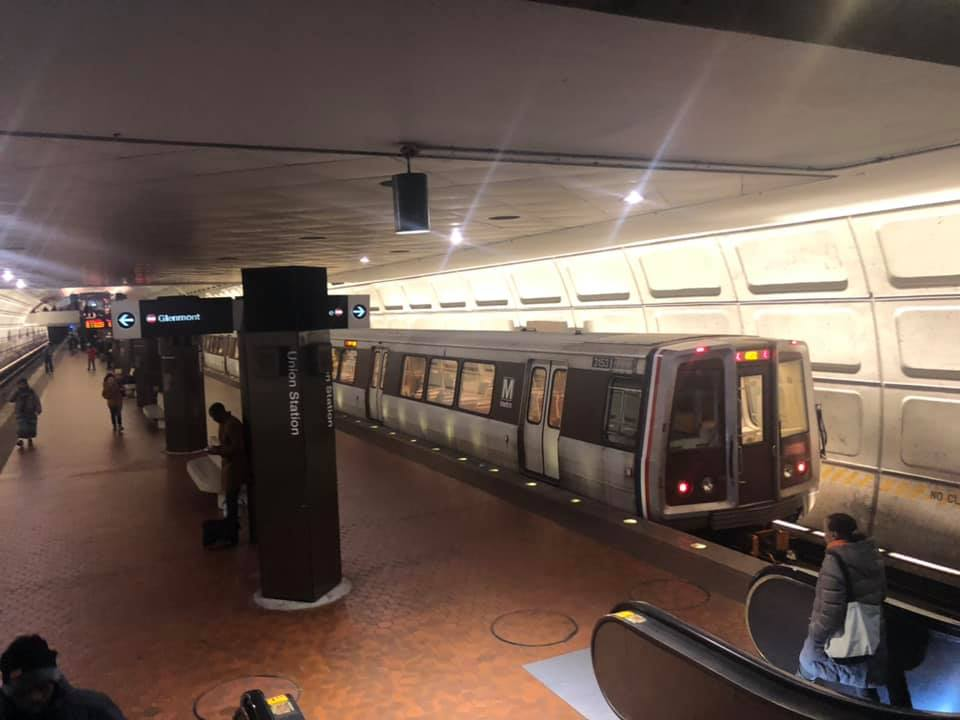
- Wide view of station platform in December 2018

General information
- Location: 701 1st Street NE; Washington, D.C.
- Coordinates: 38°53′52″N 77°00′24″W
- Owner: Washington Metropolitan Area Transit Authority
- Platforms: 1 island platform
- Tracks: 2
- Connections: Amtrak, MARC, VRE at Union Station; Metrobus: C43, C51, C55, C71, D20, D24, D2X, D30, D80; Loudoun County Transit; MTA Maryland Bus: 903, 922

Construction
- Structure type: Underground
- Cycle facilities: Capital Bikeshare, 23 racks
- Accessible: Yes

Other information
- Station code: B03

History
- Opened: March 27, 1976
- Former names: Union Station–Visitor Center (until January 21, 1982)

Passengers
- 2025: 18,393 (average weekday)
- Rank: 1 of 98

Services
Preceding station	Washington Metro	Following station
Judiciary Square toward Shady Grove	Red Line	NoMa–Gallaudet U toward Glenmont
Former services
Preceding station	Washington Metro	Following station
Judiciary Square toward Farragut North	Green Line Commuter Shortcut	Rhode Island Avenue toward Greenbelt
Route map
Location

Union Station is a Washington Metro station in Washington, D.C., on the Red Line. The station is located in the Northeast quadrant of the city under the western end of Washington Union Station, the main train station for Washington. With a daily average of 12,202 tapped entries in 2024, it was the busiest station in the system.

== Station layout ==
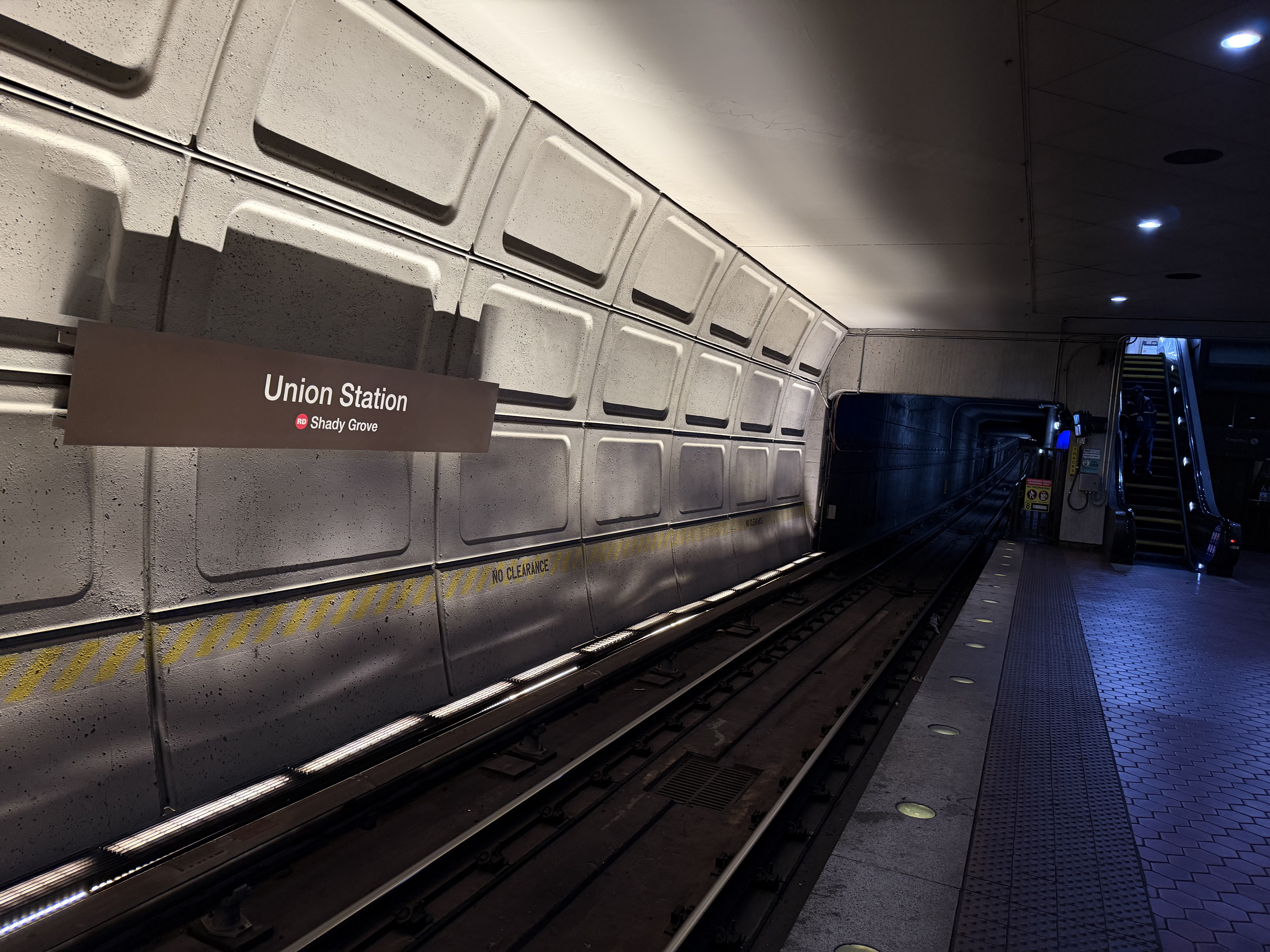
Union Station Metro Station in January 2026

Like the other original stations of the Metro, Union Station sports coffered vaults of concrete in its ceiling. One end of the station has a lowered "box" cut out of the ceiling. The station features an island platform with two exits, one mid-platform mezzanine leading to the main hall of Union Station and Massachusetts Avenue and the one northern exit leading to 1st Street NE and to the main boarding concourse. The station features escalators with the elevator between them as seen at Addison Road and North Bethesda between the mezzanine and platform.

Union Station is the last underground station for northbound trains to Glenmont until Forest Glen.

== History ==
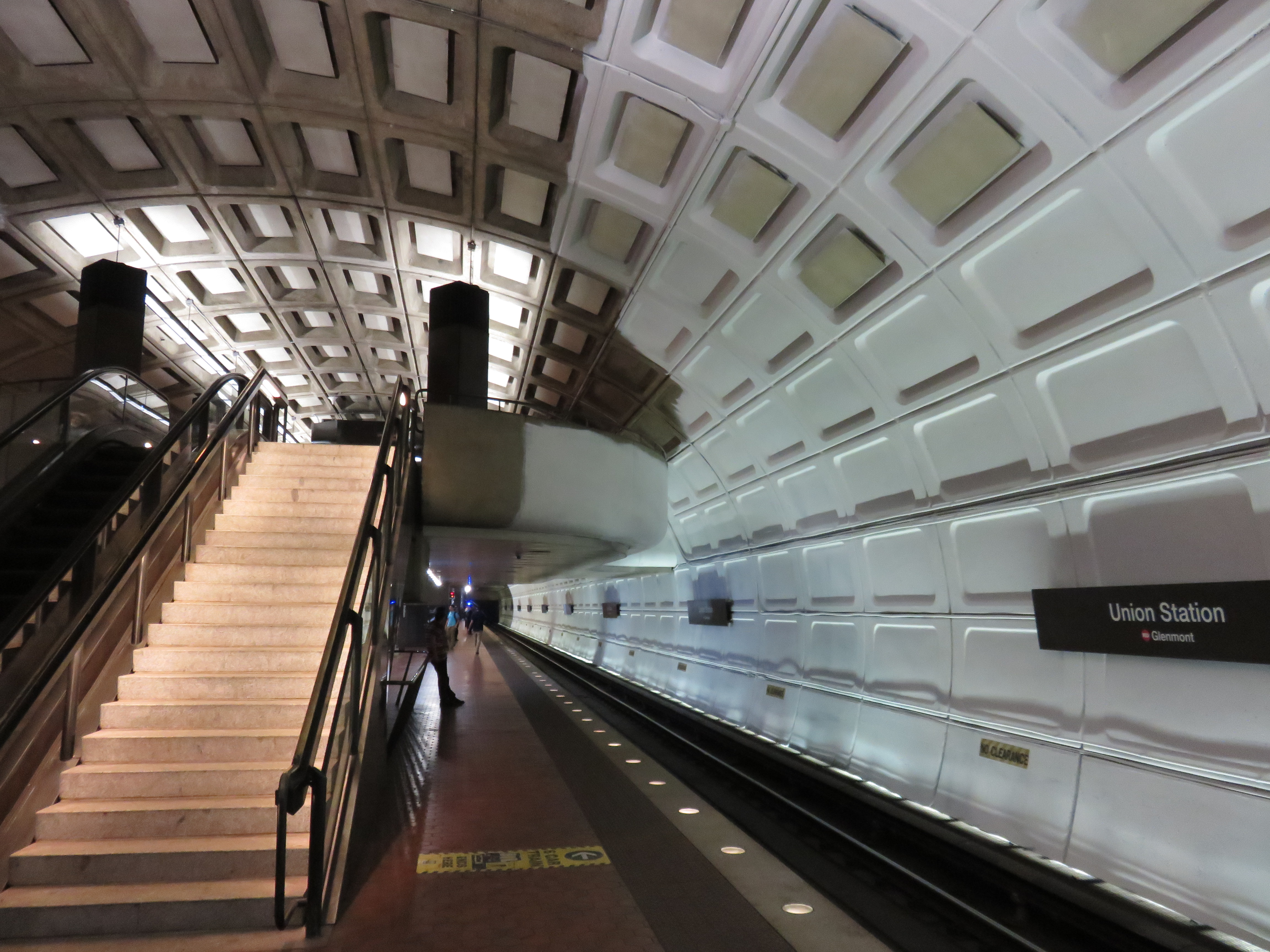
The station in the process of being painted white in April 2017

After groundbreaking in 1969, the station opened as Union Station-Visitor Center (National Visitor Center) on March 27, 1976, with the rest of the Red Line. It was renamed to simply "Union Station" in 1982 following the closure of the National Visitor Center.

Union Station had dirtier walls than most stations as trains brought in soot from diesel engines in Union Station, resulting in a dimmer station. In March 2017, it was announced the station would be painted white at a cost of $75,000–$100,000. This sparked a debate amongst riders, as preservationists did not like the irrevocable act of painting the brutalist cavern, while other riders liked the brightened stations and cleaner feels that resulted from the white paint.

Between January 15 to January 21, 2021, the station was closed because of security concerns due to the 2020 Inauguration.

The street-level entrance on First Street, built into the existing retaining wall, was rebuilt to accessible-compliant standards, adding more space for extra fare gates and connections between the platform and track level. During initial construction of the station, a 600-foot (180-meter) pedestrian tunnel was constructed between the north mezzanine and H Street NE. However, prior to the station's opening, the tunnel was boarded up and the space is now used by WMATA to store equipment. There have been plans to incorporate the abandoned tunnel into future station planned improvements.
