= Washington Union Station =

Intermodal hub in Washington, D.C.

Union Station Washington, D.C.
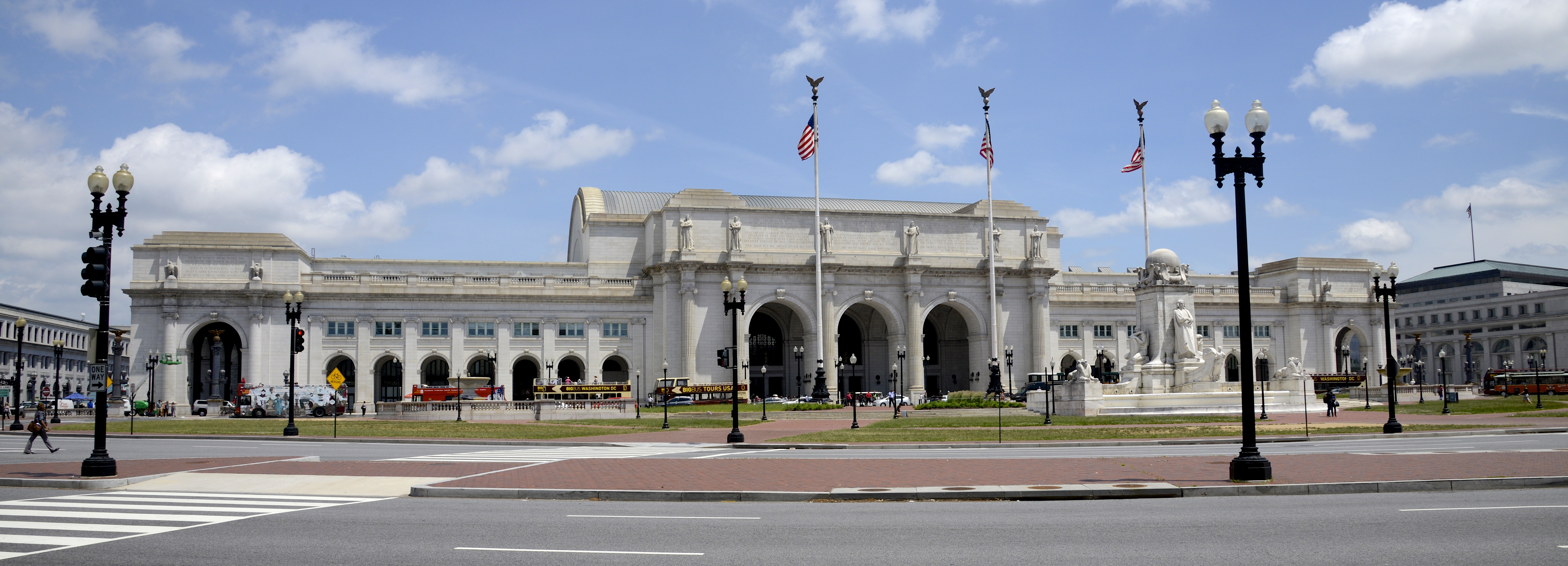
- Union Station in May 2015

General information
- Location: 50 Massachusetts Avenue NE; Washington, D.C., U.S.
- Coordinates: 38°53′50″N 77°00′23″W
- Owner: United States Department of Transportation (station building and parking); Washington Terminal Company/Amtrak (platforms and tracks) Union Station Redevelopment Corp.
- Operator: Amtrak
- Lines: Amtrak Northeast Corridor; CSX RF&P Subdivision
- Platforms: 18
- Tracks: 22
- Train operators: Amtrak, MARC, VRE
- Bus stands: located on the mezzanine level
- Bus operators: WMATA Metrobus; Maryland MTA Commuter Bus; Loudoun County Commuter Bus; PRTC Buses; Greyhound Lines; Peter Pan Bus Lines; Washington Deluxe; BestBus; OurBus
- Connections: at Union Station; Metropolitan Branch Trail

Construction
- Parking: 2,448 spaces
- Cycle facilities: 180
- Accessible: Yes

Other information
- Station code: Amtrak: WAS
- IATA code: ZWU
- Fare zone: 1 (VREX)
- Website: unionstationdc.com

History
- Opened: 1908
- Rebuilt: 1981–1989
- Electrified: January 28, 1935 (ceremonial); February 10, 1935 (regular service)

Passengers
- FY 2025: 6,010,221 (Amtrak only)
Services
Preceding station	Amtrak	Following station
Terminus	Acela	BWI Airport toward Boston South
Terminus	Vermonter	New Carrollton toward St. Albans
Alexandria toward Chicago	Cardinal	Baltimore toward New York
Alexandria toward Charlotte	Carolinian	Baltimore toward New York
Alexandria toward Miami	Silver Meteor	Baltimore toward New York
Alexandria toward Miami	Floridian	Rockville toward Chicago
Alexandria toward New Orleans	Crescent	BWI Airport toward New York
Alexandria toward Norfolk, Newport News or Roanoke	Northeast Regional	New Carrollton toward Boston South or Springfield
Alexandria toward Savannah	Palmetto	New Carrollton toward New York
Preceding station	MARC	Following station
Silver Spring toward Martinsburg or Frederick	Brunswick Line	Terminus
Terminus	Camden Line	Riverdale toward Camden Station
Terminus	Penn Line	New Carrollton toward Perryville
Preceding station	Virginia Railway Express	Following station
L'Enfant toward Spotsylvania	Fredericksburg Line	Terminus
L'Enfant toward Broad Run	Manassas Line	Terminus
Former services
Preceding station	Amtrak	Following station
Terminus	Chesapeake	Capital Beltway toward Philadelphia–Suburban
Alexandria toward Tri-State	Hilltopper	New Carrollton toward Boston South
Terminus	Metroliner	Capital Beltway toward New York
Silver Spring toward Cincinnati (River Road)	Shenandoah	Terminus
Terminus	National Limited	Capital Beltway toward Kansas City
Terminus	Montrealer	Capital Beltway toward Montreal
Rockville toward Chicago	Capitol Limited	Terminus
Alexandria toward Miami	Silver Star	Baltimore toward New York
Preceding station	Baltimore and Ohio Railroad	Following station
Takoma toward Chicago	Main Line	Riverdale toward Jersey City
University toward Chicago	Main Line	Langdon toward Jersey City
Preceding station	Chesapeake and Ohio Railway	Following station
Alexandria toward Cincinnati	Main Line	Terminus
Preceding station	Pennsylvania Railroad	Following station
Terminus	Philadelphia, Wilmington and Baltimore Railroad	Landover toward Philadelphia
Preceding station	Southern Railway	Following station
Alexandria toward Birmingham	Main Line	Terminus
Preceding station	Richmond, Fredericksburg and Potomac Railroad	Following station
Washington 7th Street toward Richmond: Broad Street or Main Street	Main Line	Terminus
Preceding station	DC Streetcar	Following station
Terminus	H Street/Benning Road Line	3rd Street toward Oklahoma Avenue
Proposed services
Preceding station	MARC	Following station
L'Enfant Plaza toward Alexandria	Penn Line	New Carrollton toward Newark
L'Enfant Plaza toward Alexandria	Brunswick Line	Silver Spring toward Martinsburg or Frederick
- Washington D.C. Union Station
- U.S. National Register of Historic Places
- Built: 1908
- Architects: D.H. Burnham & Company (William Pierce Anderson, Daniel Burnham)
- Architectural style: Classical, Beaux-Arts, among others
- NRHP reference No.: 69000302
- Designated: March 24, 1969
Location

Washington Union Station, known locally as Union Station, is a major train station, transportation hub, and leisure destination in Washington, D.C. Designed by Daniel Burnham and opened in 1907, it is Amtrak's second-busiest station and North America's 13th-busiest railroad station. The station is the southern terminus of the Northeast Corridor, an electrified rail line extending north through major cities including Baltimore, Philadelphia, New York City, and Boston, and the busiest passenger rail line in the nation. In 2015, it served just under five million passengers.

An intermodal facility, Union Station also serves MARC and VRE commuter rail services, the Washington Metro, intercity bus lines, and local Metrobus buses. It carries the IATA airport code of ZWU.

At the height of its traffic, during World War II, as many as 200,000 passengers passed through the station in a single day. In 1988, a headhouse wing was added and the original station renovated for use as a shopping mall. As of 2014, Union Station was one of the busiest rail facilities and shopping destinations in the United States, visited by over 40 million people a year. The COVID-19 pandemic and other factors caused a sharp decline in retail and dining; by late 2022, more than half its commercial space was vacant. Amtrak took control of the station in 2024 and is working on a major renovation and expansion. On August 27, 2025, the Trump administration announced it would negotiate to resume direct federal management of non-railroad areas.

== History ==
=== Pre-Union Station terminals ===
Before Union Station opened, each of the major railroads operated out of one of two stations:

- New Jersey Avenue Station (1851–1907): Baltimore and Ohio Railroad trains arrived and left from this railroad station. It was located at the corner of New Jersey Avenue NW and C Street NW.
- Baltimore and Potomac Railroad Station (1872–1907): Baltimore and Potomac Railroad (B&P), a subsidiary of the Pennsylvania Railroad, the Chesapeake and Ohio Railway, and the Southern Railway all left from this train station. It was located at the corner of B Street NW, now Constitution Avenue, and 6th Street NW.

The Baltimore and Ohio Railroad line ran east on D Street NE across North Capitol Street, then north on Delaware Avenue NE. It divided into two lines. The Metropolitan branch continued north on 1st Street NE, turning east on New York Ave NE and continuing north through Eckington. The other line turned east onto I Street NE up to 7th Street NE where it headed back north on what is today West Virginia Avenue running next to the Columbia Institution for the Deaf and Dumb (now Gallaudet University).

=== 20th century ===
==== Construction ====
When the Pennsylvania Railroad and the Baltimore and Ohio Railroad announced in 1901 that they had agreed to build a new union station together, the city had two reasons to celebrate. The decision meant that both railroads would soon remove their trackwork and terminals from the National Mall. Though changes there appeared only gradually, the consolidation of the depots allowed the creation of the Mall as it appears today. Secondly, the plan to bring all the city's railroads under one roof promised that Washington would finally have a station both large enough to handle large crowds and impressive enough to befit the city's role as the federal capital. The station was to be designed under the guidance of Daniel Burnham, a famed Chicago architect and member of the U.S. Senate Park Commission, who in September 1901 wrote to the Commission's chairman, Sen. James McMillan, of the proposed project: "The station and its surroundings should be treated in a monumental manner, as they will become the vestibule of the city of Washington, and as they will be in close proximity to the Capitol itself."

After two years of complicated and sometimes contentious negotiations, Congress passed S. 4825 (58th-1st session) entitled "An Act to provide a union railroad station in the District of Columbia" which was signed into law by 26th President Theodore Roosevelt on February 28, 1903. The Act authorized the Washington Terminal Company (which was to be jointly owned by the B&O and the PRR-controlled Philadelphia, Baltimore and Washington Railroad) to construct a station "monumental in character" that would cost at least $4 million (equivalent to $120 million in 2025). (The main station building's actual cost eventually exceeded $5.9 million [equivalent to $177 million in 2025].) Including additional outlays for new terminal grades, approaches, bridges, viaducts, coach and freight yards, tunnels, shops, support buildings and other infrastructure, the total cost to the Terminal Company for all the improvements associated with Union Station exceeded $16 million (equivalent to $481 million in 2025). This cost was financed by $12 million (equivalent to $361 million in 2025) in first mortgage bonds as well as advances by the owners which were repaid by stock and cash.

Each carrier also received $1.5 million (equivalent to $45.1 million in 2025) in government funding to compensate them for the costs of eliminating grade crossings in the city. The only railroad station in the nation specifically authorized by the U.S. Congress, the building was primarily designed by William Pierce Anderson of the Chicago architectural firm of D.H. Burnham & Company.

==== Effect on the neighborhood ====
Though the project was supported by the federal government, there was opposition at the local level. The new depot would displace residents and cleave new neighborhoods east of the tracks.

On January 10, 1902, representatives of the railroads presented preliminary plans for the construction of the Union Depot (Union Station) to representatives of the District of Columbia. They proposed to build tunnels under the tracks for K, L, and M Streets NE and to close H Street. The street would be closed 300 feet (91 m) on both sides of Delaware Avenue (for a total of 600 feet [180 m]). If a tunnel was to be built for H Street NE, the cost would be an extra $10,000 (equivalent to $301,000 in 2025).

Three days later, officers and members of the Northeast Washington Citizens' Association expressed their outrage to representatives of Congress and the railroads at an Association meeting at the Northeast Temple on H Street NE. The president of the Association claimed that the Pennsylvania Railroad controlled Congress; a member of the Association threatened to take the matter to court. The Association declared unacceptable the loss of a major access road to downtown for the residents of Northeast; the loss of millions of dollars of business properties and of the business it represented; the closure of a vital streetcar line used by commuters, considering the alternative cost of building an access across the tracks.

At the association's March 10, 1902, meeting, its president told the audience that the District Commissioners had heard their complaints, and that H Street would remain open with a 750-foot (230 m) tunnel running under the tracks.

More than 100 houses were demolished to make way for the station and its tracks. The demolition erased the heart of an impoverished neighborhood called "Swampoodle" where crime was rampant. It was the end of a community but the beginning of a new era for Washington, D.C. Tiber Creek, which was prone to flooding, was put in a tunnel. Delaware Avenue disappeared from the map between Massachusetts Avenue and Florida Avenue under the tracks. Only a small section remains, next to the tracks between L and M Streets NE.

==== Opening and operation ====
The first B&O train to arrive with passengers was the Pittsburgh Express, at 6:50 a.m. on October 27, 1907; the first PRR train arrived three weeks later on November 17. The main building itself was completed in 1908. Of the 32 station tracks present at the time, 23 entered from the northeast and terminate at the station's headhouse. The remaining 9 tracks continued below ground level to the south via a 4,033-foot twin-tube tunnel passing under Capitol Hill and an 898-foot long subway under Massachusetts Avenue. These latter tracks allow through traffic direct access to the rail networks both north and south of the city.

Among the new station's unique features was an opulent "Presidential Suite" (aka "State Reception Suite") where the U.S. President, State Department and Congressional leaders could receive distinguished visitors arriving in Washington. Provided with a separate entrance, the suite (which was first used by 27th President William Howard Taft in 1909) was also meant to safeguard the Chief Executive during his travels in an effort to prevent a repeat of the July, 1881 assassination of 20th President James A. Garfield in the old former Baltimore and Potomac Railroad Station. The suite was converted in December 1941, during World War II, to a U.S.O. (United Services Organization) canteen, which went on to serve 6.5 million military service members during World War II. Although closed on May 31, 1946, it was reopened in 1951 as a U.S.O. lounge and dedicated by President Harry Truman as a permanent "home away from home" for traveling U.S. Armed Services members.

On the morning of January 15, 1953, the Pennsylvania Railroad's Federal, the overnight train from Boston, crashed into the station. When the engineer tried to apply the trainline brakes two miles out of the platforms, he discovered that he only had engine brakes. A switchman on the approach to the station noticed the runaway train and telephoned a warning to the station, as the train coasted downhill into track 16. The GG1 electric locomotive, No. 4876, hit the bumper block at about 35 miles per hour (56 km/h), jumped onto the platform, destroyed the stationmaster's office at the end of the track, took out a newsstand, and was on its way to crashing through the wall into the Great Hall. Just then, the floor of the terminal, having never been designed to carry the 475,000-pound weight of this locomotive, gave way, dropping the engine into the basement. The 447,000-pound (202,800 kg) electric locomotive fell into about the center of what is now the food court. Remarkably, no one was killed, and passengers in the rear cars thought that they had only had a rough stop. An investigation revealed that an anglecock on the brakeline had been closed, probably by an icicle knocked from an overhead bridge. The accident inspired the finale of the 1976 film Silver Streak. The durable design of the GG1 made its damage repairable, and it was soon back in service after being hauled away in pieces to the PRR's main shops in Altoona, Pennsylvania. Before the latter action was undertaken, the GG1 and the hole it made were temporarily planked over and hidden from view due to the imminent inauguration of General Dwight D. Eisenhower as the thirty-fourth President of the United States.

Until intercity passenger rail service was taken over by Amtrak on May 1, 1971, Union Station served as a hub for the Baltimore and Ohio Railroad, Chesapeake and Ohio Railway, Pennsylvania Railroad, and Southern Railway. The Richmond, Fredericksburg and Potomac provided a link to Richmond, Virginia, about 100 miles (161 km) to the south, where major north–south lines of the Atlantic Coast Line Railroad and Seaboard Air Line Railroad provided service to the Carolinas, Georgia and Florida. World War II was the busiest period in the station's history in terms of passenger traffic, with up to 200,000 people passing through on a single day.

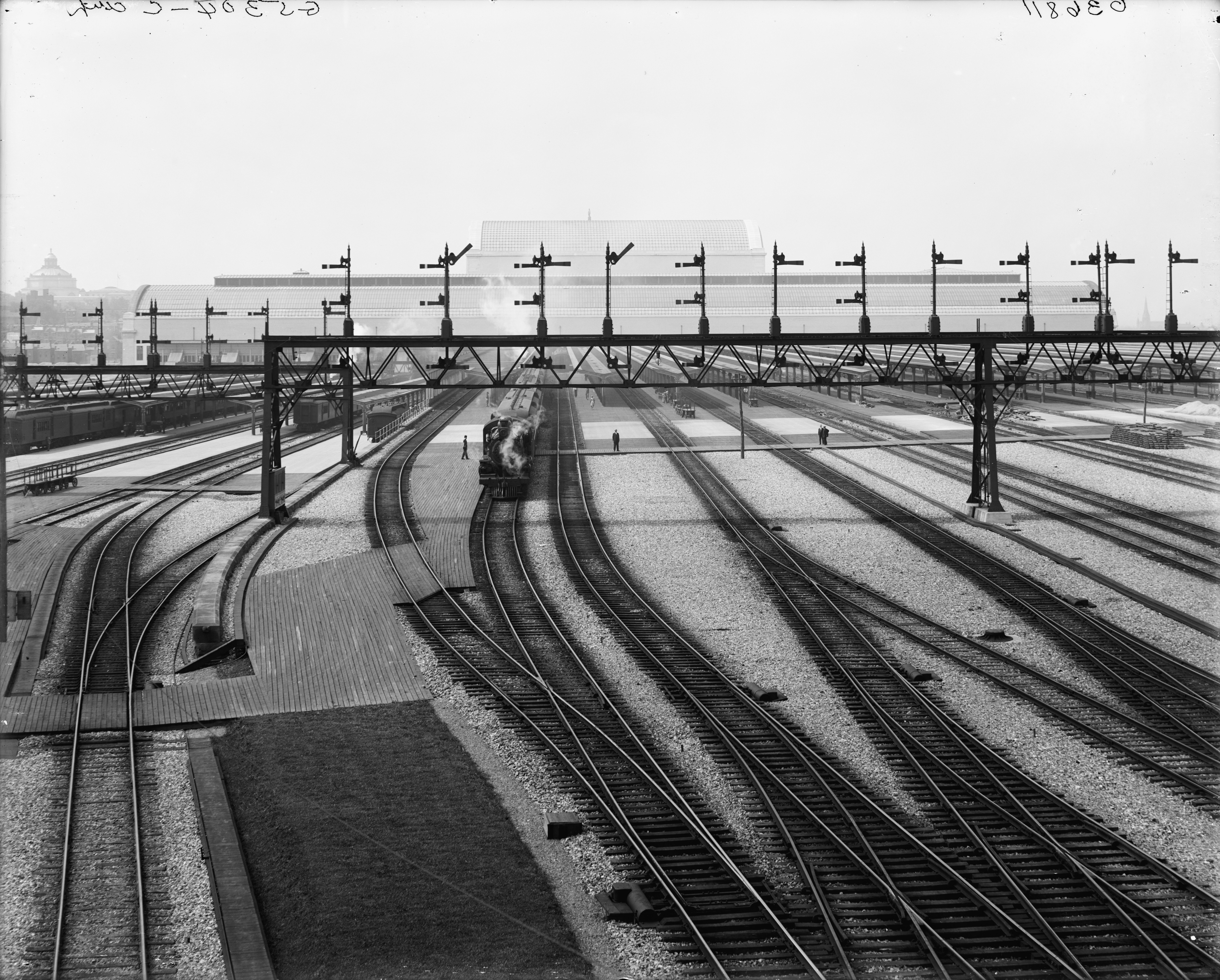
Trains at the station shortly after its completion, c. 1908

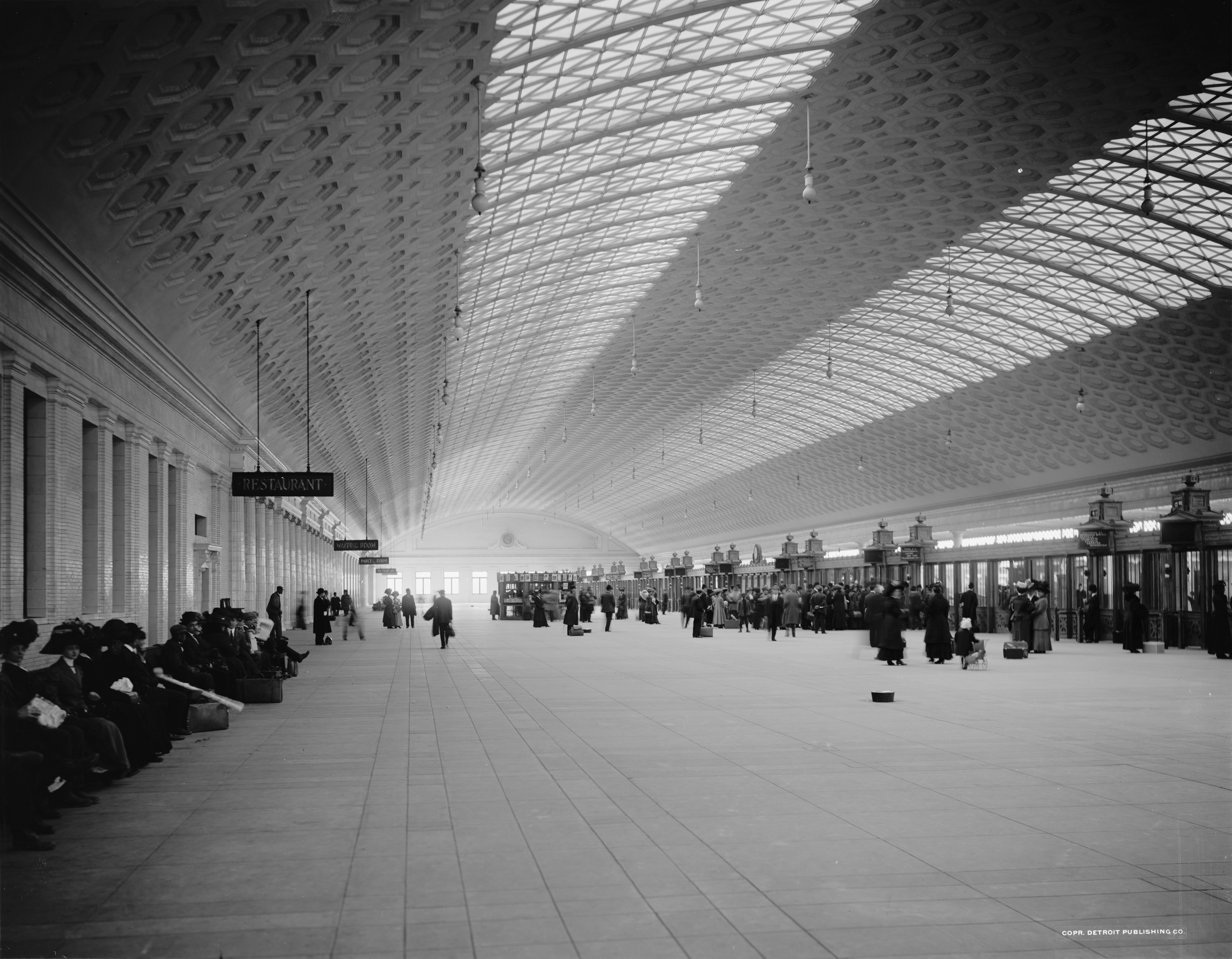
Train concourse, c. 1915

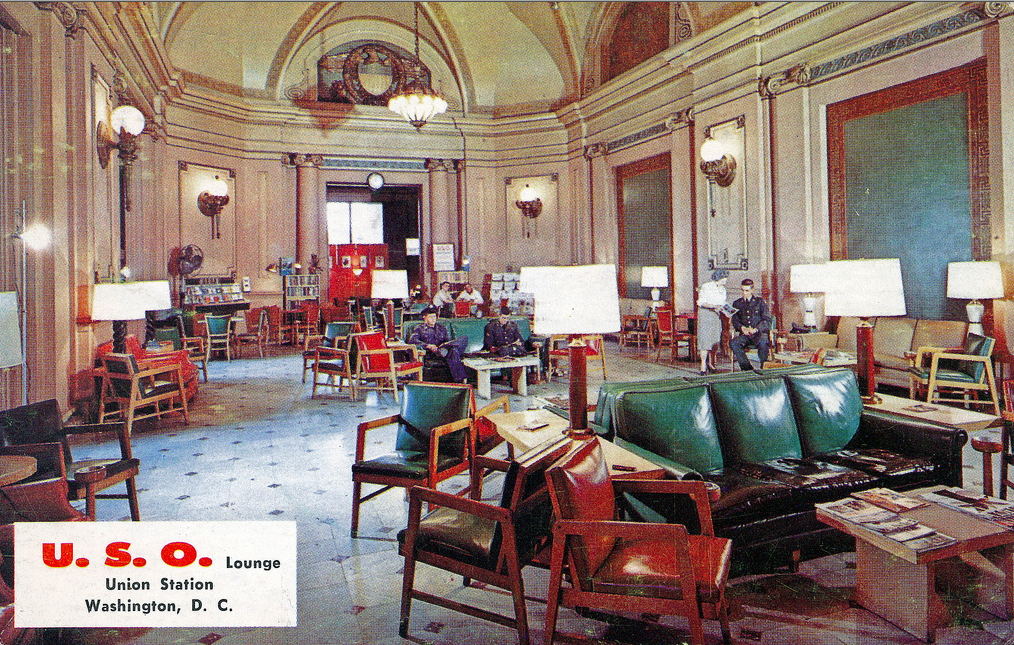
U.S.O. Lounge (former Presidential Suite), c. 1960

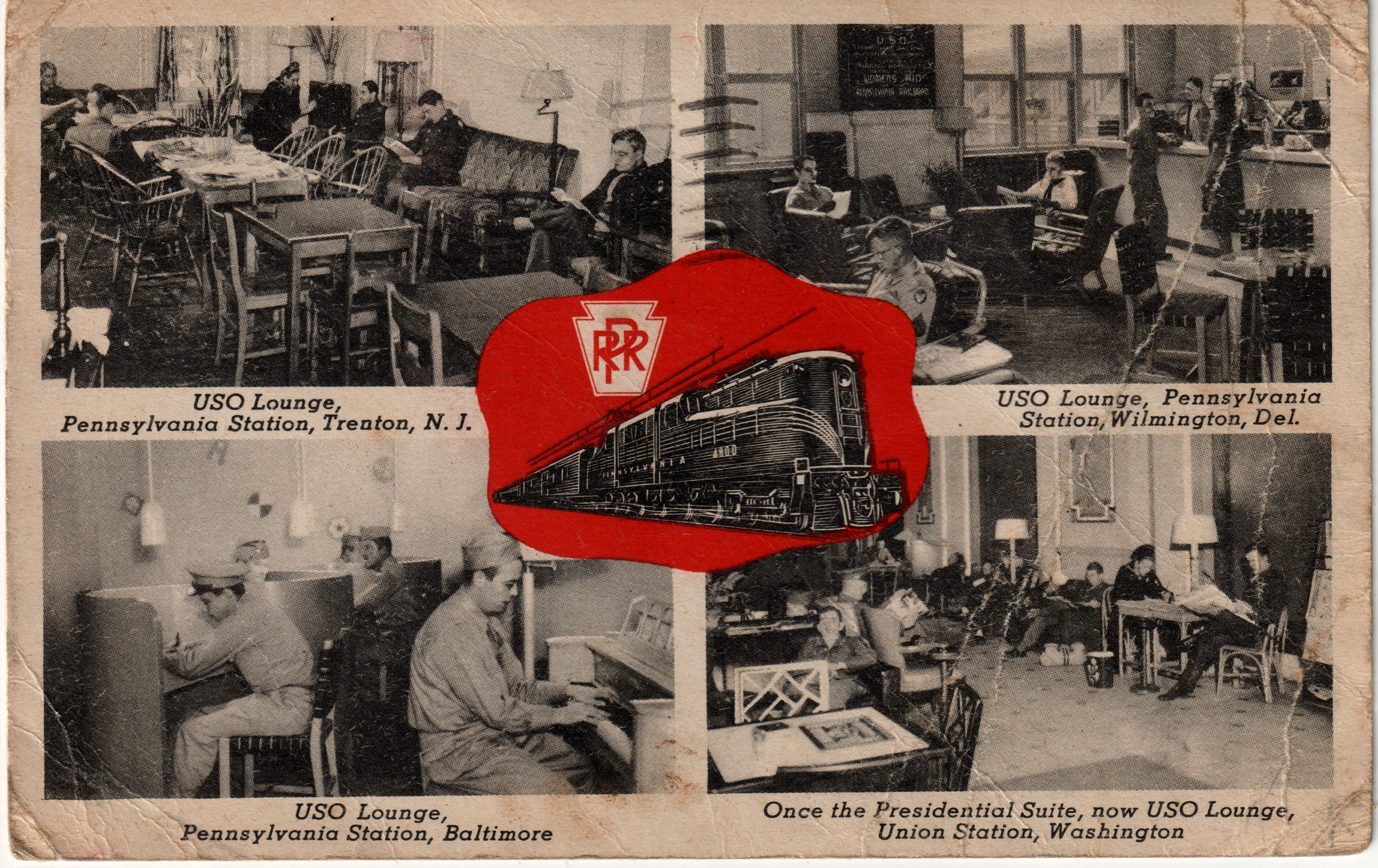
USO lounge in use in the 1940s, along with those of other stations on an advertising card

==== Decline ====
The "Pit"

In 1967, the chairman of the Civil Service Commission expressed interest in using Union Station as a visitor center during the upcoming Bicentennial celebrations. Funding for this was collected over the next six years, and the reconstruction of the station included outfitting the Main Hall with a recessed pit to display a slide show presentation. This was officially the PAVE (Primary Audio-Visual Experience), but was sarcastically referred to as "the Pit". The entire project was completed, save for the parking garage, and opening ceremonies were held on Independence Day 1976. Due to a lack of publicity and convenient parking, the National Visitor Center was never popular. Financial considerations caused the National Park Service to close the theaters, end the slideshow presentation in "the Pit", and lay off almost three-quarters of the center's staff on October 28, 1978.

During this time a replacement station for Amtrak had been built behind the Union Station concourse and under a parking garage. Two traffic lanes were planned but were actually only wide enough for 1-1/2 lanes. On observing its low ceiling and plastic chairs New Yorker magazine editor E. M. Frimbo described it as "...a bad small town bus terminal." Train passengers had to walk 1,900 feet from the front door to the tracks. The most common question asked at the Visitor Center was, "Where are the trains?"

After the leaking roof caused the partial collapse of plaster from the ceiling in the eastern wing of the building, the National Park Service declared the entire structure unsafe on February 23, 1981, and sealed the structure to the public.

==== Restoration ====
The 1981 ceiling collapse deeply alarmed members of Congress and officials in the new Reagan administration. On April 3, despite a budget austerity push, administration officials proposed a plan to appropriate $7 million (equivalent to $21 million in 2025) to allow the Department of the Interior to finish its authorized $8 million (equivalent to $23.9 million in 2025) roof repair program. In addition, the government of the District of Columbia would be permitted to reprogram up to $40 million (equivalent to $120 million in 2025) in federal highway money to finish the parking garage at Union Station. On October 19, administration officials and members of the United States Senate Committee on Commerce, Science, and Transportation agreed on additional aspects of the plan. Up to $1 million (equivalent to $2.99 million in 2025) would be authorized and appropriated to fund a study on needed repairs at the station and a second study on the feasibility of turning Union Station into a retail complex. The Department of Transportation (DOT) was authorized to sign contracts with any willing corporation to construct a retail complex in and around Union Station. DOT was also authorized to spend up to $29 million (equivalent to $86.8 million in 2025) in already-appropriated money from its Northeast Corridor rail capital building program on Union Station repairs. The revised bill also required DOT to take control of Union Station from the Department of the Interior, and for DOT to buy out its lease with the station's private-sector owners. The buy-out would be spread over six years, for which $275,000 a year (equivalent to $8.23 million in 2025) was authorized and appropriated. The bill required DOT to operate Union Station as a train station once more, complete with ticketing, waiting areas, baggage areas, and boarding. Although no statement was made in the bill, Senate aides said the intent was to have Amtrak tear down its 1960s-era station at the rear of Union Station and move its operations back inside. The Senate passed the bill unanimously on November 23. The House approved the bill on December 16. President Ronald Reagan signed the Union Station Redevelopment Act into law on December 29.

As a result of the Redevelopment Act of 1981, Union Station was closed for restoration and refurbishing. Mold was growing in the leaking ceiling of the Main Hall, and the carpet laid out for an Inauguration Day celebration was full of cigarette-burned holes. In 1988, Secretary of Transportation Elizabeth Dole awarded $70 million (equivalent to $164 million in 2025) to the restoration effort. "The Pit" was transformed into a new basement level, and the Main Hall floor was refitted with marble. While installing new HVAC systems, crews discovered antique items in shafts that had not been opened since the building's creation.

==== Remodel ====
Washington Union Station Mall
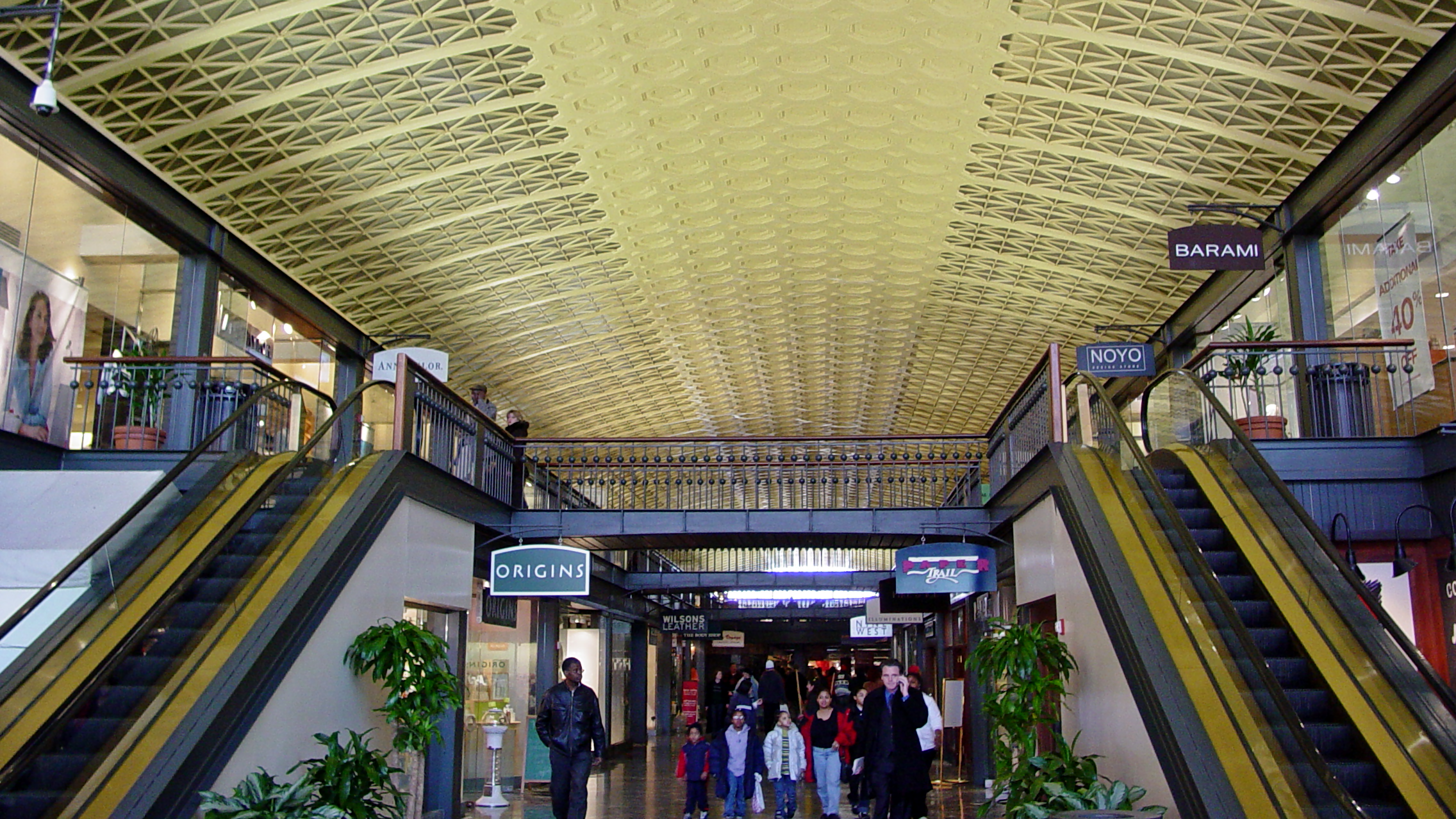
- Shopping mall section in February 2003
- Location: Washington, D.C., U.S.
- Address: 50 Massachusetts Ave NE, 20002
- Opened: September 29, 1988; 38 years ago
- Developer: Williams Jackson Ewing (WJE) and the Union Station Redevelopment Corporation
- Manager: Union Station Redevelopment Corporation (under direction by USDOT)
- Owner: Federal Railroad Administration
- Architect: Benjamin Thompson & Associates, Inc.
- Num. of stores: 130+ (at peak)
- Parking: Union Station Car Park (Parking garage)

Washington Union Station Mall is a festival marketplace in Washington, D.C., United States, that is currently undergoing a significant management transition following the termination of long-standing private leasehold agreements. The previous operator of the retail space, New York-based Ashkenazy Acquisition Corporation, has been accused of neglecting the mall and not filling in vacancies.

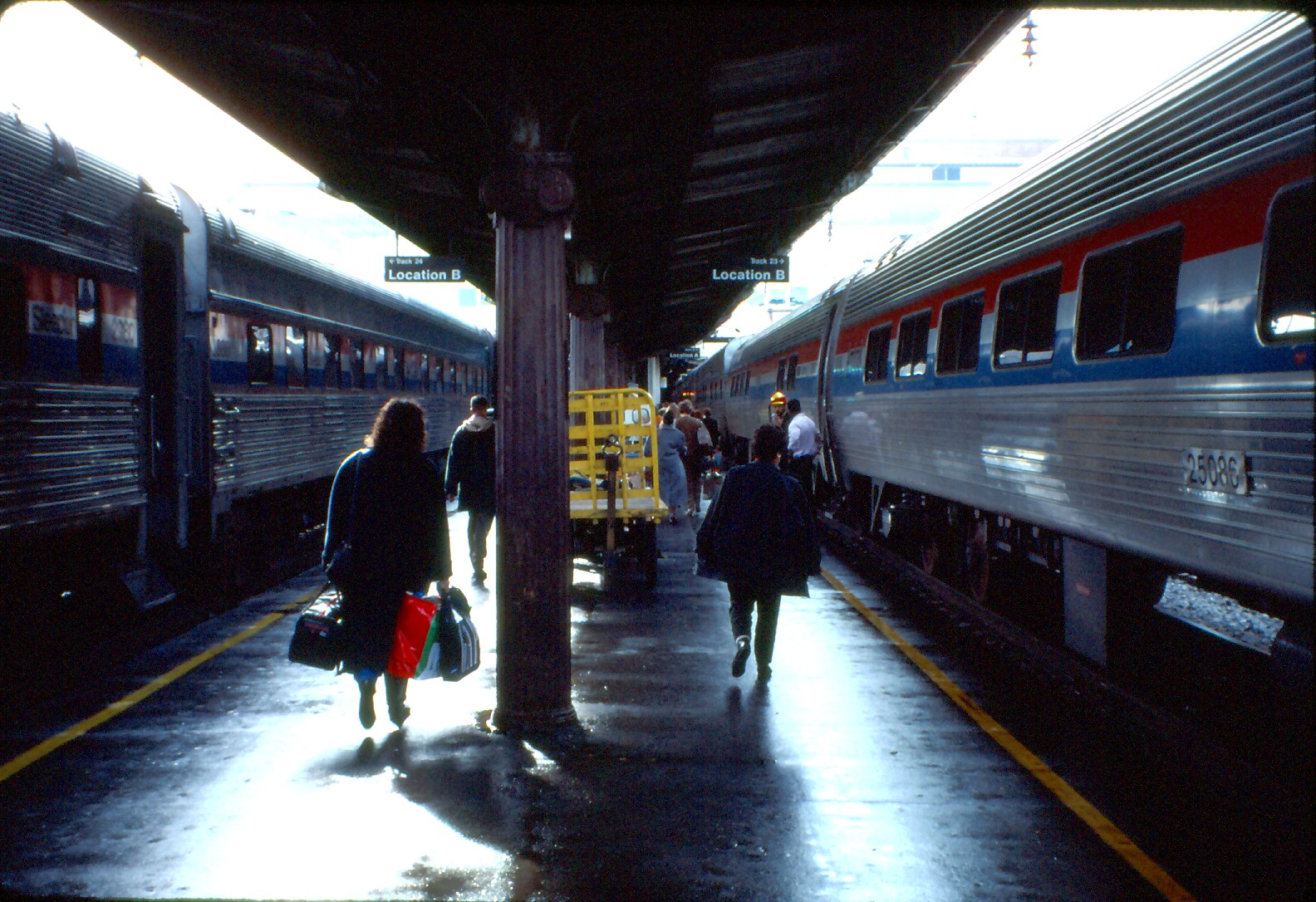
Trains on the platform in January 1994

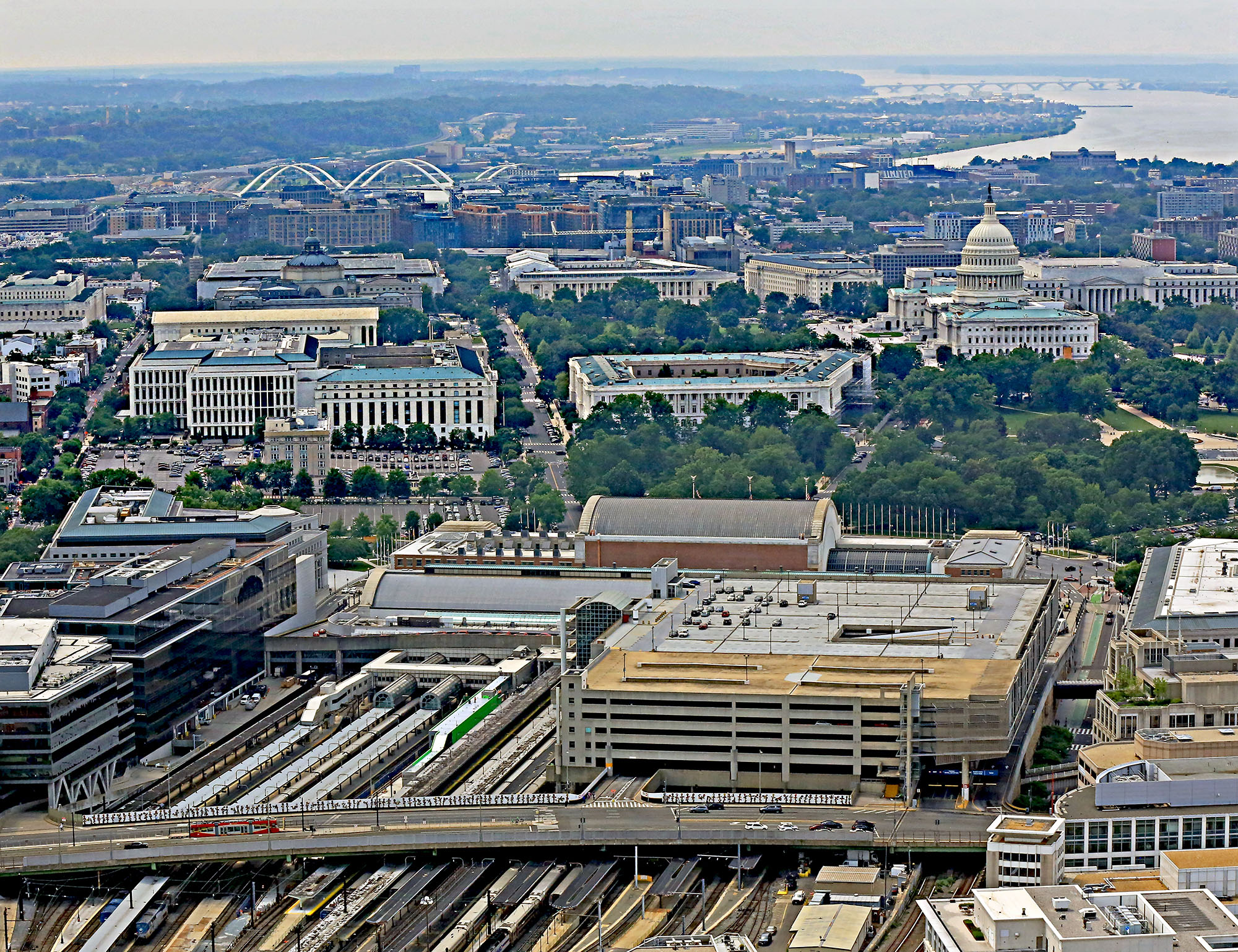
Washington Union Station with the United States Capitol in the background in May 2022

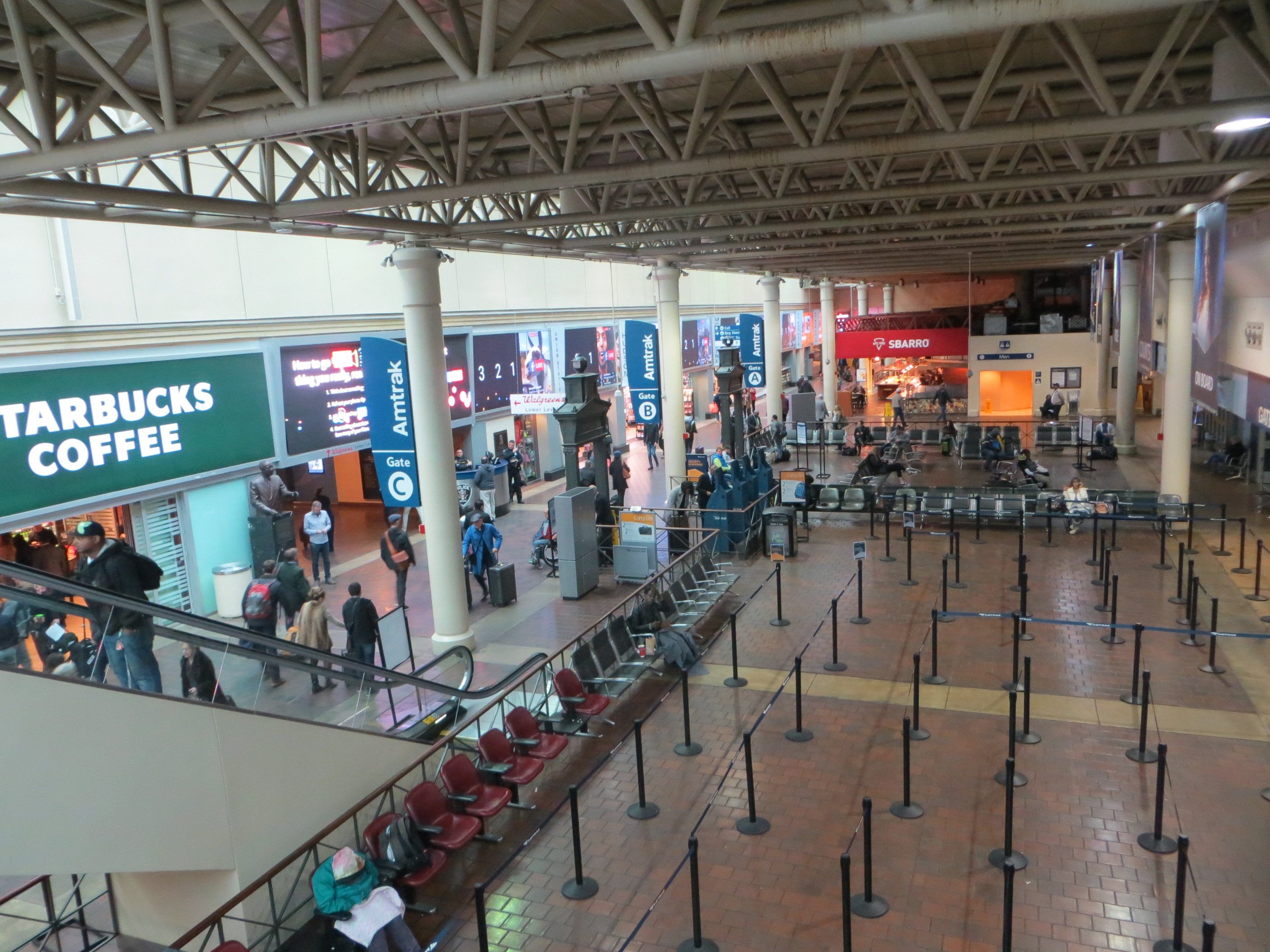
The Amtrak boarding area in November 2016. It is behind the original structure opened in September 1988

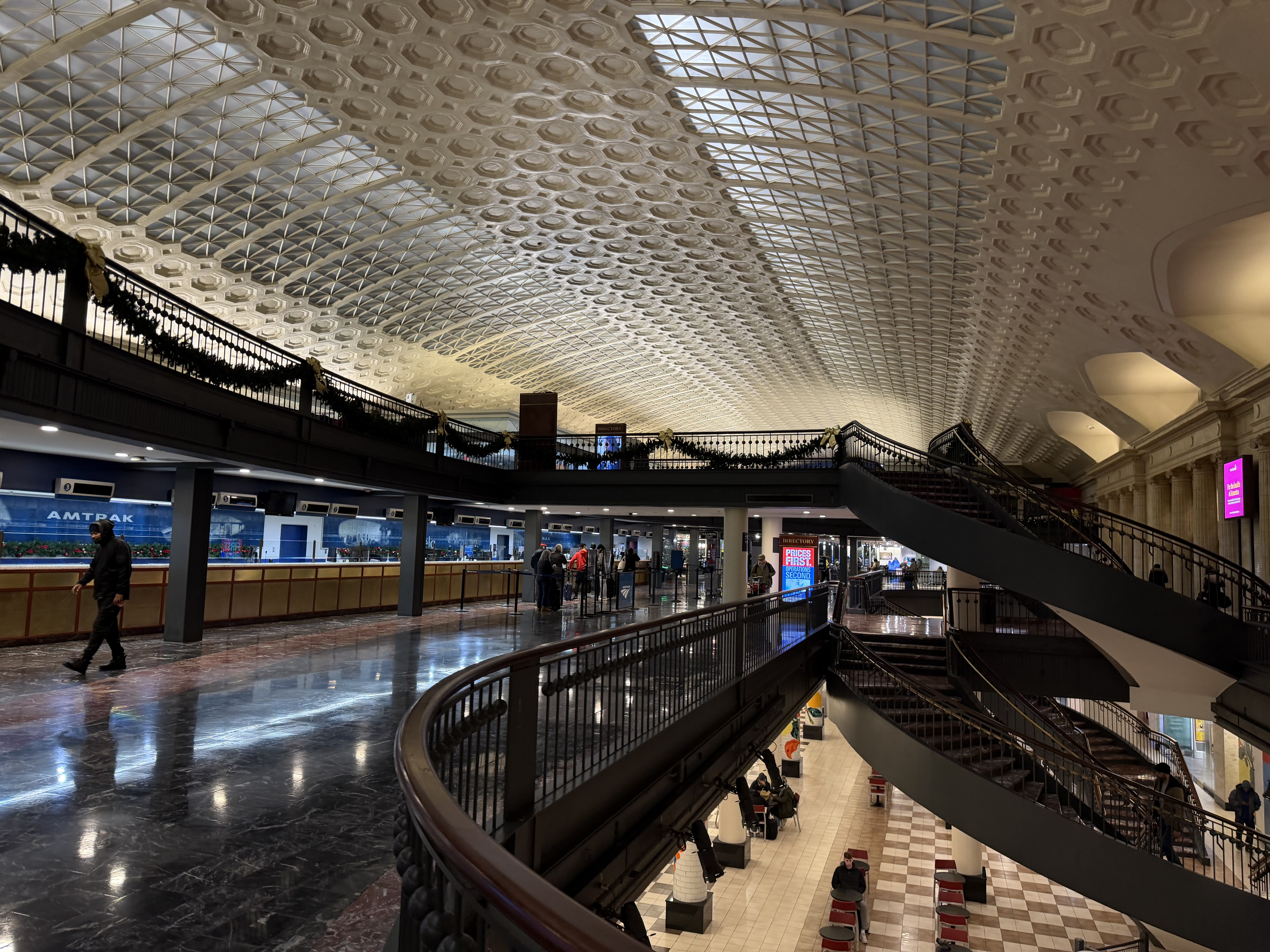
The main concourse of Union Station in December 2025

The mall was developed by former Rouse Company executives Jackson "Jackie" Ewing, famous for Faneuil Hall Marketplace, Michael Ewing, who directed the WJE firm on integrating retail into historical landmarks, and Roy Williams, a principal at WJE who helped oversee the Union Station project, applying "festival marketplace" concepts pioneered at Rouse properties, including Baltimore's Harborplace. Union Station Mall was designed by Benjamin C. Thompson, who also designed Harborplace and Faneuil Hall Marketplace.

The station reopened in its present form on September 29, 1988. The former "Pit" area was replaced with a movie theater called Union Station 9, which later became AMC Theatres (operating as AMC Union Station 9), and after that, became Phoenix Theatres (operating as Phoenix Theatres Union Station 9), which closed on October 12, 2009, and was replaced with an expanded food court and a Walgreens store. The food court still retains the original arches under which the trains were parked as well as the track numbers on those arches. A variety of shops opened along the Concourse and Main Hall, and a new Amtrak terminal at the back behind the original Concourse. Trains no longer enter the original Concourse, but the original, decorative gates were relocated to the new passenger concourse. In 1994, this new passenger concourse was renamed to honor W. Graham Claytor Jr., who served as Amtrak's president from 1982 to 1993. The decorative elements of the station were also restored. The skylights were preserved, but sunlight no longer illuminates the Concourse because it is blocked by the newer roof structure built directly overhead to support the aging, original structure.

=== 21st century ===
Ashkenazy Acquisition Corporation acquired Union Station Mall in late January 2007 for $160 million from Union Station Venture II.

In July 2012, Amtrak announced a four-phase, $7 billion plan to revamp and renovate the station over 15 to 20 years. The proposed conversion would "double the number of trains and triple the number of passengers in gleaming, glass-encased halls". Then-Amtrak President and CEO Joseph H. Boardman hoped the federal government would finance "50 to 80 percent" of the project.

In June 2015, the Union Station Redevelopment Corporation released a Historic Preservation Plan to guide preservation and restoration at the station complex.

==== A new decline ====
The cinema closed in 2009, B. Smith's restaurant and Barnes & Noble in 2013, and the latter's replacement, H&M, in 2019.

Amtrak moved its headquarters offices from Union Station to a nearby building in 2017. That same year, the Trump administration listed an $8.7 billion expansion and refurbishment of Washington Union Station as an infrastructure funding priority. In the early 2020s, the station saw a further decline in the number of restaurants and stores as a result of the COVID-19 pandemic.

"A once-thriving terminal is now filled with vacant storefronts," the Washington Post reported in 2022. "Union Station had as many as 100 stores more than two decades ago. It’s down to about 40 retailers and eateries while more than half its commercial space sits vacant." The station continued to wrestle with issues stemming from people experiencing homelessness camped around the station and relying on its waiting and restroom facilities.

==== Renovations after transfer ====
In April 2022, Amtrak began condemnation proceedings to take over the leasehold interest, saying that "poor maintenance and lack of capital investment" had "plagued" the station for years. Ashkenazy handed the mall to its lender, Rexmark, through foreclosure. In the meantime, the agency described plans for a major renovation and expansion, which seek to triple passenger capacity and double train capacity by modernizing and expanding station facilities over 20 years. The "Second Century Plan" accommodates Burnham Place, a planned transit-oriented, three million square-foot mixed-use development over the existing rail yard, that will connect the station complex to the burgeoning neighborhoods of NoMa and the H Street Corridor. The plan cleared a regulatory obstacle in March 2024, when the Federal Railroad Administration completed its final environmental impact statement.

On April 17, 2024, U.S. District Court Judge Amit Mehta ruled that Amtrak could seize the station’s commercial space through eminent domain, with the price to be set later. Officials said the renovation could start as early as 2027. Amtrak took over control of Union Station in late July 2024. Though Amtrak agreed to pay $505 million for the station's leasehold in February 2025, the station's former operator USSM sued to prevent the agreement from being approved.

On August 8, 2024, free transfers were implemented between MARC and VRE via Union Station with a ten-trip ticket, weekly pass, or monthly pass. The intention of the transfers was affordable travel across state lines, connecting urban centers, and more job opportunities.

In March 2025, a federal judge dismissed Ashkenazy's last remaining claims to the station, ruling the company had no legal right to any portion of the settlement proceeds due to the firm allowing the facility to deteriorate.

In August 2025, a former lower-level storage track (Track 22) was reopened as a platform track for Amtrak and VRE use. On August 27, 2025, the Trump administration announced it would negotiate to resume direct federal management of non-railroad areas. The mall is now owned by the Federal Railroad Administration (U.S. Department of Transportation (USDOT)). The Union Station Redevelopment Corporation (USRC) now manages the retail, office, and event spaces.

On March 5, 2026, the National Capital Planning Commission (NCPC) approved a plan to install energy-efficient white lighting on the station's exterior, the purpose being to improve public safety and light up the building's architecture at night, with completion expected by early 2027.

Amtrak is nearing the completion of its Concourse Modernization Project. This renovation includes double passenger capacity by the end of 2026, with expanded seating, improved boarding processes, and upgraded restrooms.

In March 2026, the USDOT launched a civics-themed storytelling program featuring large-scale visual installations at the station to celebrate America250.

The Trump administration cancelled the previously approved expansion project in July 2026.

== Architecture ==
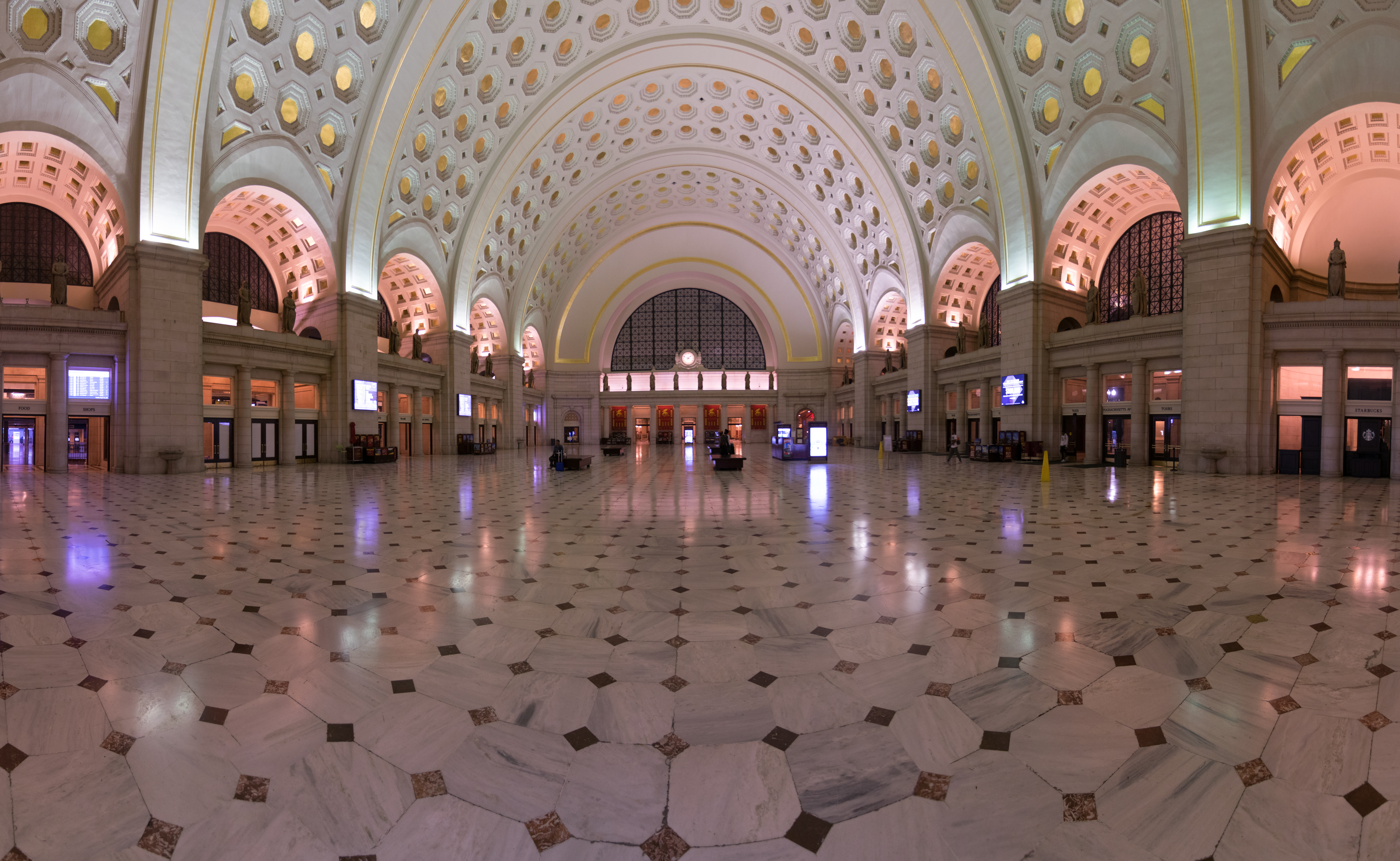
The central interior of Union Station in August 2017

Architect Daniel H. Burnham, assisted by Pierce Anderson, was inspired by a number of architectural styles. Classical elements included the Arch of Constantine (exterior and main façade) and the great vaulted spaces of the Baths of Diocletian (interior); prominent siting at the intersection of two of Pierre (Peter) Charles L'Enfant's avenues, with an orientation that faced the United States Capitol just five blocks away; a massive scale, including a façade stretching more than 600 feet (180 m) and a waiting room ceiling 96 feet (29 m) above the floor; stone inscriptions and allegorical sculpture in the Beaux-Arts style; expensive materials such as marble, gold leaf and white granite from a previously unused quarry.

In the Attic block, above the main cornice of the central block, stand six colossal statues (modeled on the Dacian prisoners of the Arch of Constantine) designed by Louis St. Gaudens. These are entitled "The Progress of Railroading" and their iconography expresses the confident enthusiasm of the American Renaissance movement:

- Prometheus (for Fire)
- Thales (for Electricity)
- Themis (for Freedom)
- Apollo (for Imagination)
- Ceres (for Agriculture)
- Archimedes (for Mechanics)
Prometheus (Fire)

Thales (Electricity)

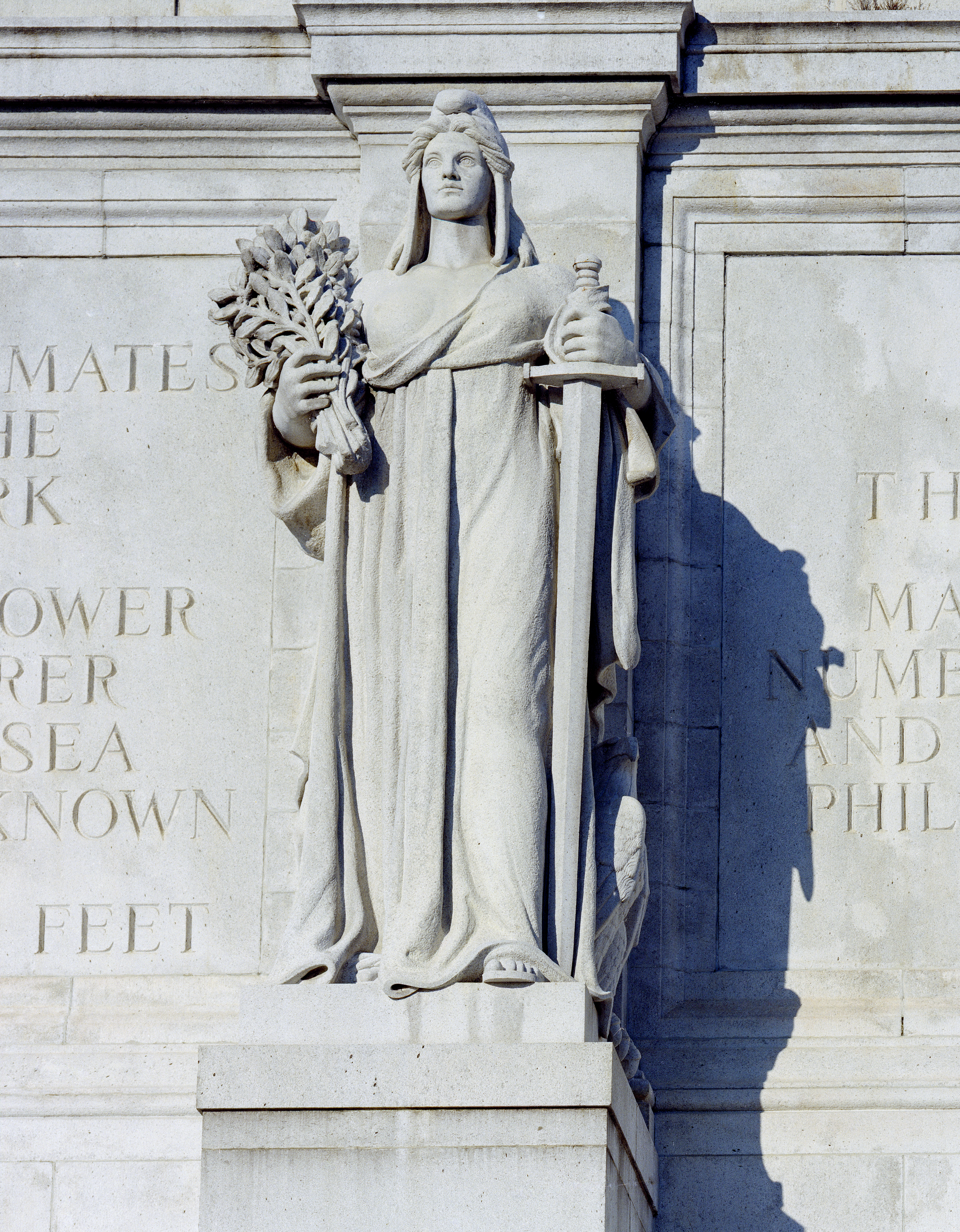
Themis (Freedom)

Ceres (Agriculture)

Archimedes (Mechanics)

The substitution of Agriculture for Commerce in a railroad station iconography vividly conveys the power of a specifically American lobbying bloc.

St. Gaudens also created the 46 centurion statues for the station's main hall, one for each state in the Union at the time the station opened. Also referred to as Legionnaires, they are made of plaster and modelled after ancient Roman soldiers, symbolically guarding over all who travel through the halls of Union Station. Each of the statues' large shields were added shortly after their installation, following complaints regarding the centurions' nudity from the hips down.

Burnham drew upon a tradition, launched with the 1837 Euston railway station in London, of treating the entrance to a major terminal as a triumphal arch. He linked the monumental end pavilions with long arcades enclosing loggias in a long series of bays that were vaulted with the lightweight fireproof Guastavino tiles favored by American Beaux-Arts architects. The final aspect owed much to the Court of Heroes at the World's Columbian Exposition of 1893 in Chicago, where Burnham had been coordinating architect. The setting of Union Station's façade at the focus of converging avenues in a park-like green setting is one of the few executed achievements of the City Beautiful movement: elite city planning that was based on the "goosefoot" (patte d'oie) of formal garden plans made by Baroque designers such as André Le Nôtre.

The station held a full range of dining rooms and other services, including barber shops and a mortuary. Union Station was equipped with a presidential suite which is now occupied by a restaurant.

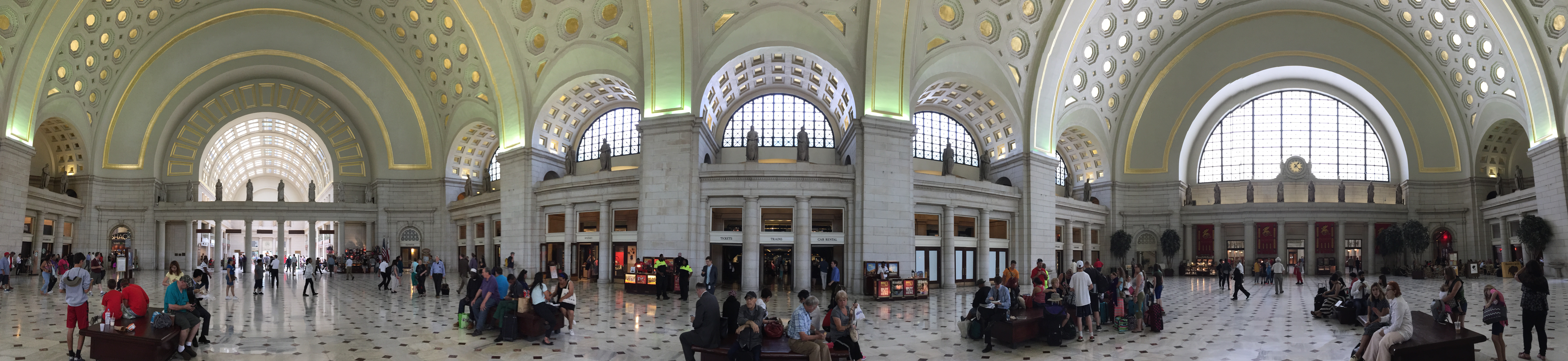
Panoramic image of the great hall in June 2016

== Services ==
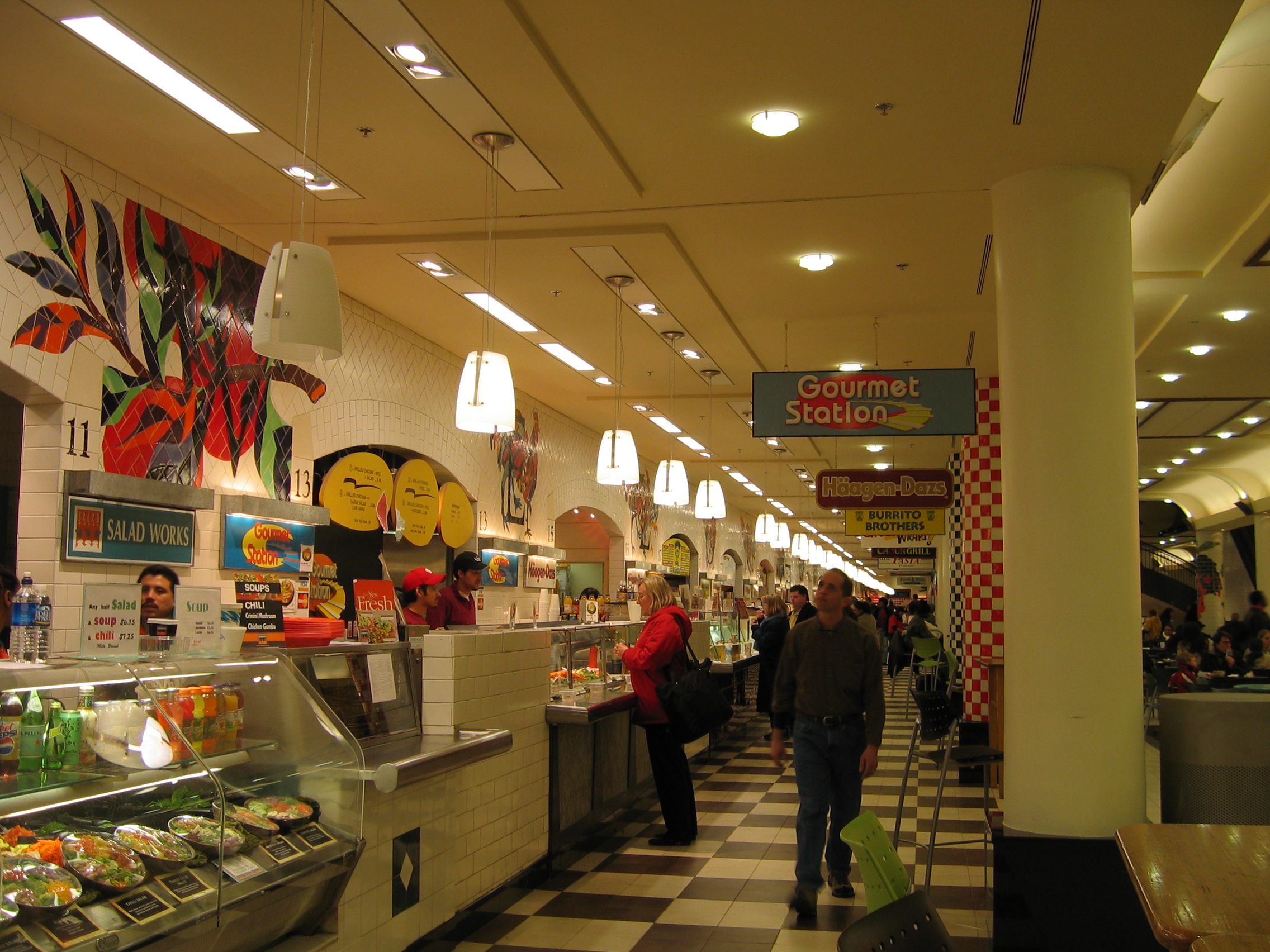
The food court at Union Station in February 2006

=== Trains ===
Union Station is served by Amtrak's high-speed Acela Express, Northeast Regional, and several of Amtrak's long-distance trains (including, among others, the Floridian, Crescent, and Silver Meteor trains). From Union Station, Amtrak also operates long-distance services to the Southeast and Midwest, to destinations such as Chicago, Charlotte, New Orleans, and Miami. In 2024, an average of more than 70,000 passengers passed through the station each day. It is also the busiest station that can handle Superliner railcars; inadequate tunnel clearances in Baltimore and New York preclude the use of Superliners on most Eastern routes.

The station is the terminus for commuter railways that link Washington to Maryland and West Virginia (MARC) and Northern Virginia (Virginia Railway Express).

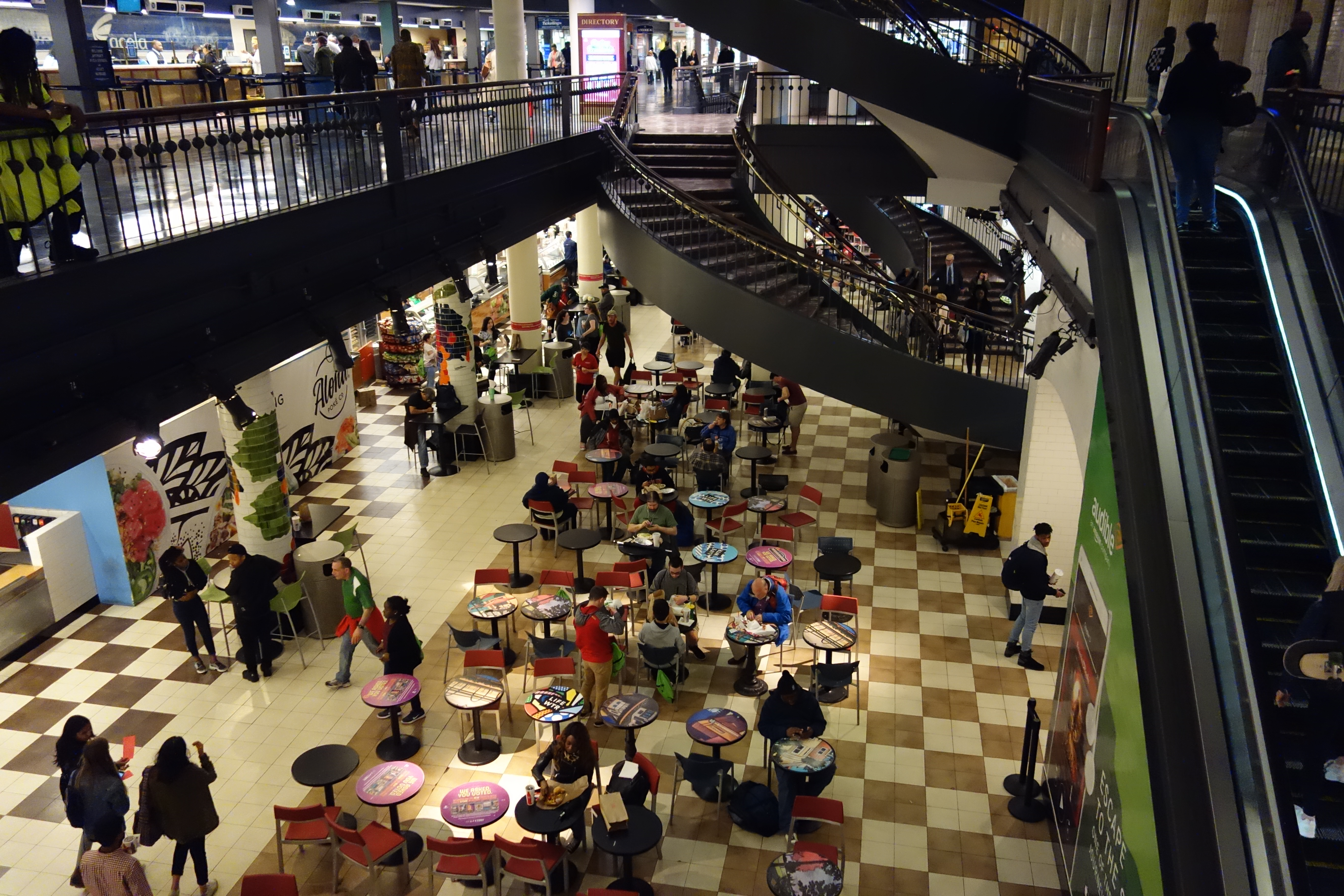
The food court from above in April 2018

The station's tracks are split between a ground level and a lower level. The ground level contains tracks 7–20 (tracks 1–6 no longer exist), which are served by high-level bay platforms at the door level of most trains. These tracks are used by all MARC commuter rail services, all Amtrak Acela Express trains, and Amtrak Northeast Regional trains that terminate at the station. All of the tracks on this level terminate at the station and are only used by trains arriving from and departing to the north.

The lower level contains tracks 22–29, which are served by low-level platforms at the track level. These platforms are served by all VRE trains, all Amtrak long-distance trains, and Amtrak Northeast Regional trains that continue south to Virginia. Unlike the tracks on the upper level, the lower level tracks run through under the station building and Capitol Hill via the First Street tunnel. Electrification ends at the station, and all trains continuing south through the tunnel must have their electric engines swapped out for diesel-electric locomotives. For example, when a southbound Northeast Regional train arrives on a lower-level platform on its way to Newport News, Virginia, its Siemens ACS-64 electric engine is removed and set aside. A GE Genesis diesel engine that was earlier removed from a northbound train is coupled to the front of the southbound, and it continues through the tunnel toward Virginia. The ACS-64 is readied for a Northeast Regional arriving from Alexandria, and once coupled pulls the train toward Baltimore, Philadelphia, and New York or Boston.

=== Transit ===
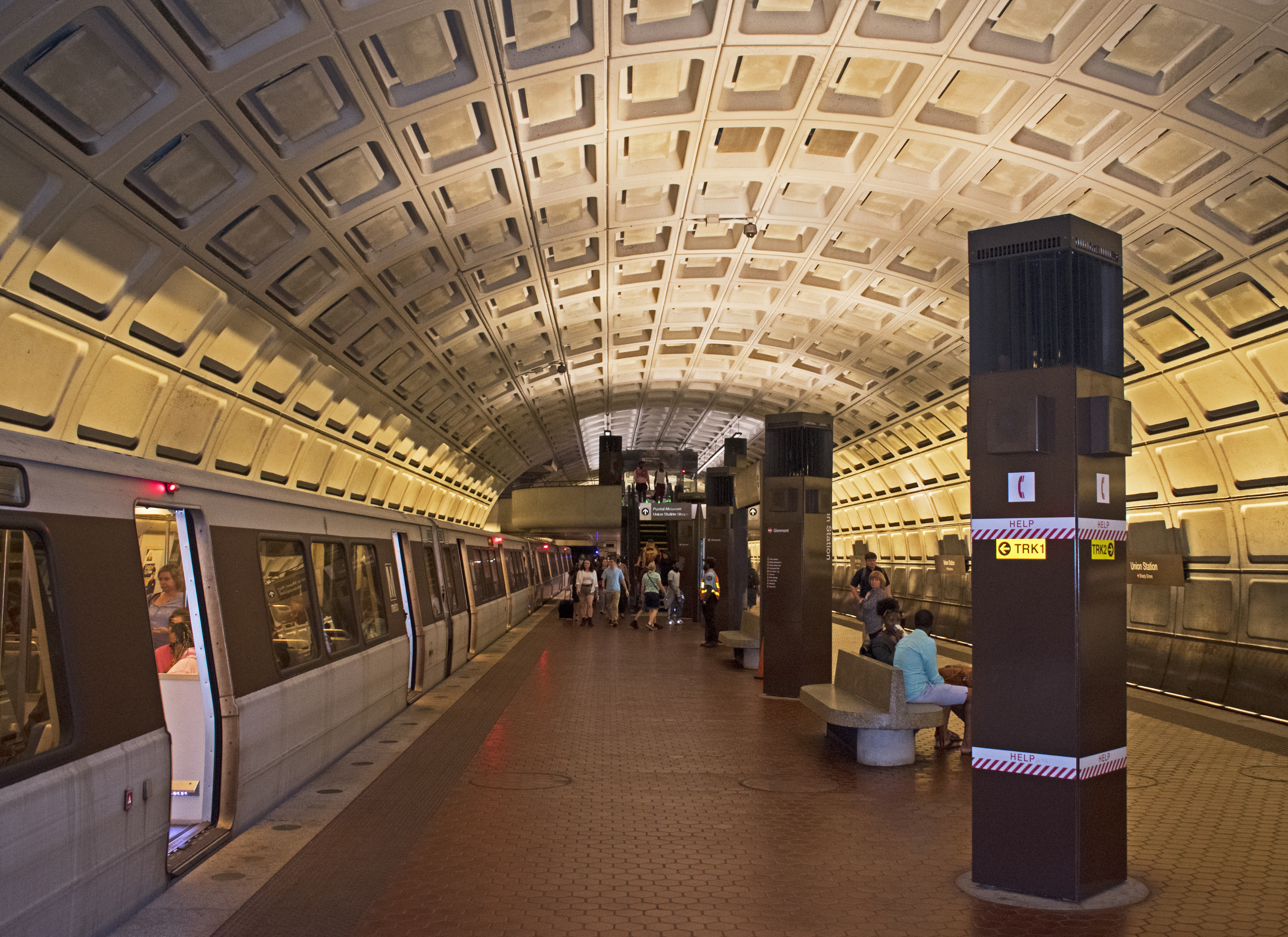
Union Station platform in August 2023, serving Washington Metro’s Red Line

A nearby Washington Metro station connects to the Red Line. The Metrorail station is underground beneath the western side of the building. Entrances are inside Union Station with direct access from the high-level MARC and Amtrak platforms, from the east side of First Street NE, or from just outside the station at Massachusetts Avenue NE, providing access to the main concourse.

The DC Streetcar's H Street/Benning Road Line served the station from a stop on the H Street Bridge (a.k.a. the "Hopscotch Bridge") directly north of the station. The stop was accessible via the station's parking garage.

=== Intercity buses ===
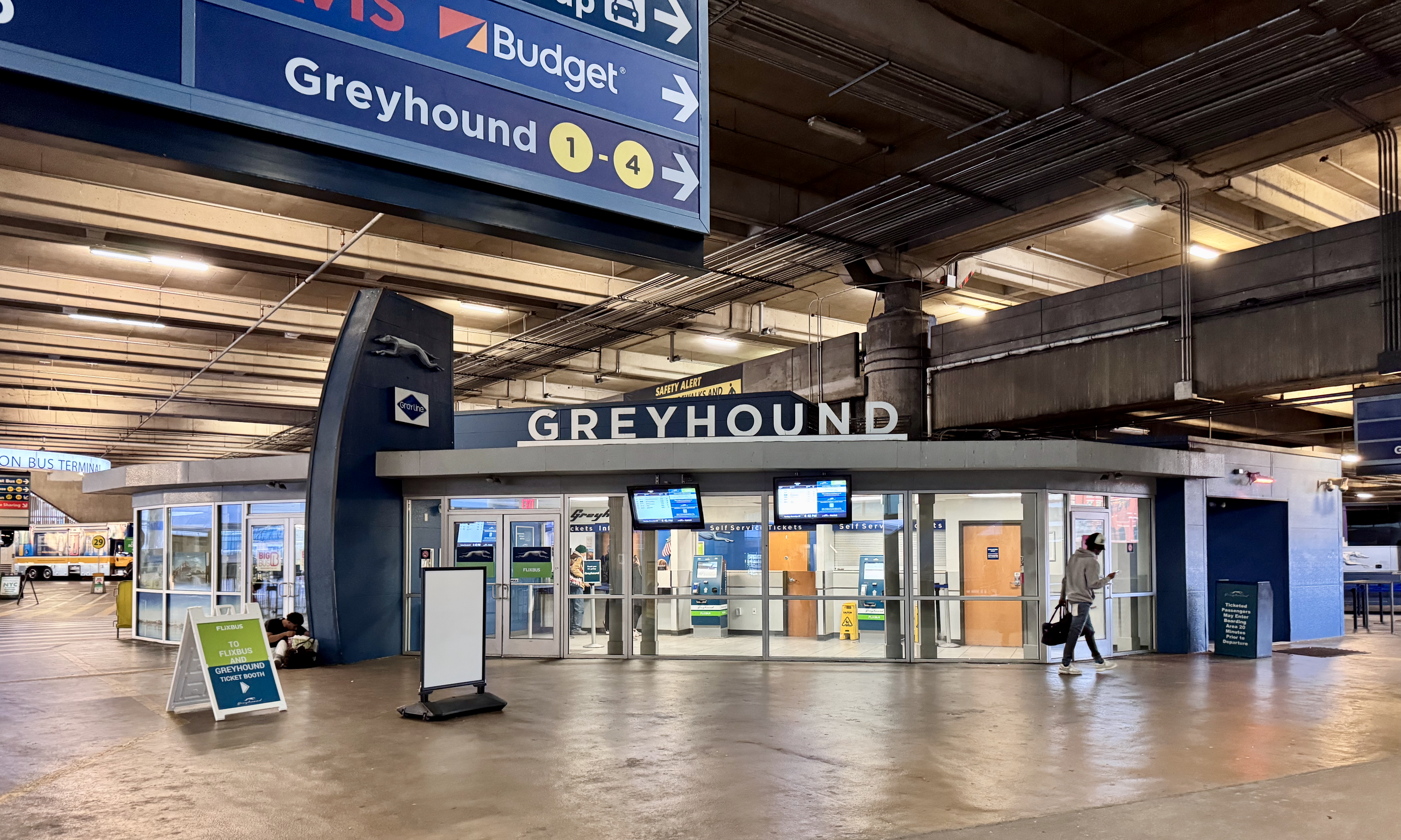
Greyhound ticket counter at the Union Station bus terminal

On August 1, 2011, John Porcari, the United States Deputy Secretary of Transportation, announced that Greyhound Lines, BoltBus, Megabus, and Washington Deluxe would begin operating intercity buses later that year from a new bus facility in the station's parking garage. By November 15, 2011, BoltBus, Megabus, Tripper Bus, and Washington Deluxe were operating from the new facility. On September 26, 2012, Greyhound and Peter Pan Bus Lines moved all of their Washington, D.C., operations to the facility. In 2017, OurBus began offering service from Union Station to Maryland, New Jersey, and New York. On August 16, 2024, Megabus discontinued service nationwide after the parent company filed for bankruptcy earlier in the year, prompting Peter Pan to take over the former's northeastern bus routes from Union Station.

=== Maintenance ===
The Ivy City Yard, just north of Union Station, houses a large Amtrak maintenance facility. This includes the new maintenance facility for the Acela high-speed train sets. Amtrak also does contract work for MARC's electric locomotives. Metro's Brentwood maintenance facility is also in the southwest corner of the Ivy City Yard. Riders on the Metro Red Line between Union Station and Rhode Island Avenue Station get an aerial view of the south end of the Ivy City Yard.

== Owner ==
Union Station is owned by Amtrak and the United States Department of Transportation. The DOT owns the station building itself and the surrounding parking lots, while Amtrak owns the platforms and tracks through the Washington Terminal Company: a nearly wholly owned subsidiary (99.9% controlling interest).

Formerly, the non-profit Union Station Redevelopment Corporation managed the station on behalf of the owners, but an 84-year lease of the property was held by Ashkenazy Acquisition Corporation and managed by Chicago-based Jones Lang LaSalle. Ashkenazy no longer owns or manages the building.

== In popular culture ==
Washington Union Station has appeared in several movies and television shows. Among them are Mr. Smith Goes to Washington (1939), Strangers on a Train (1951), Don't Give Up the Ship (1959), Hannibal (2001), Collateral Damage (2002), and Head of State (2003).

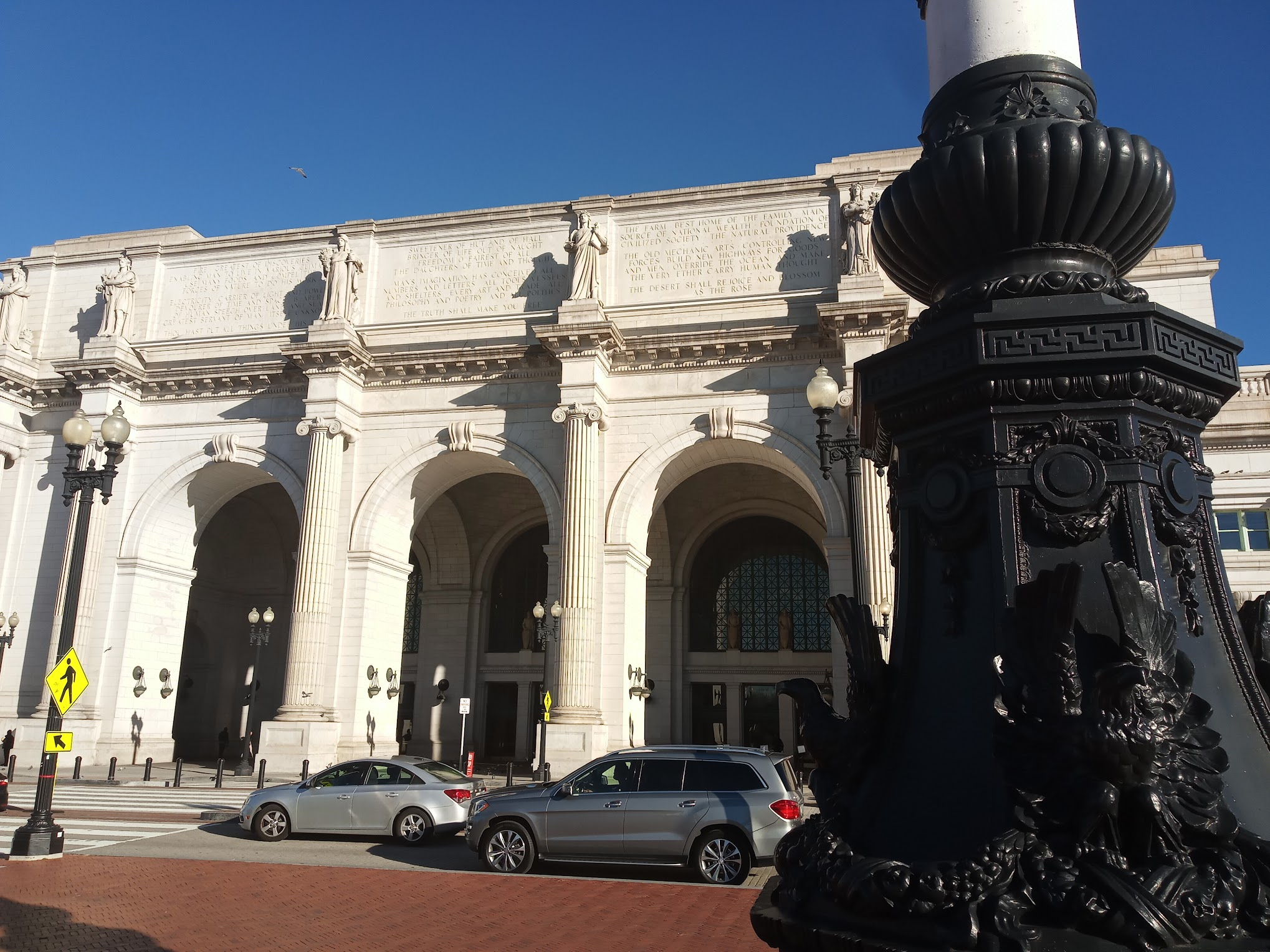
Union Station Facade

== Gallery ==
Map showing the impact of the railway tracks

Map showing the impact of Union Station

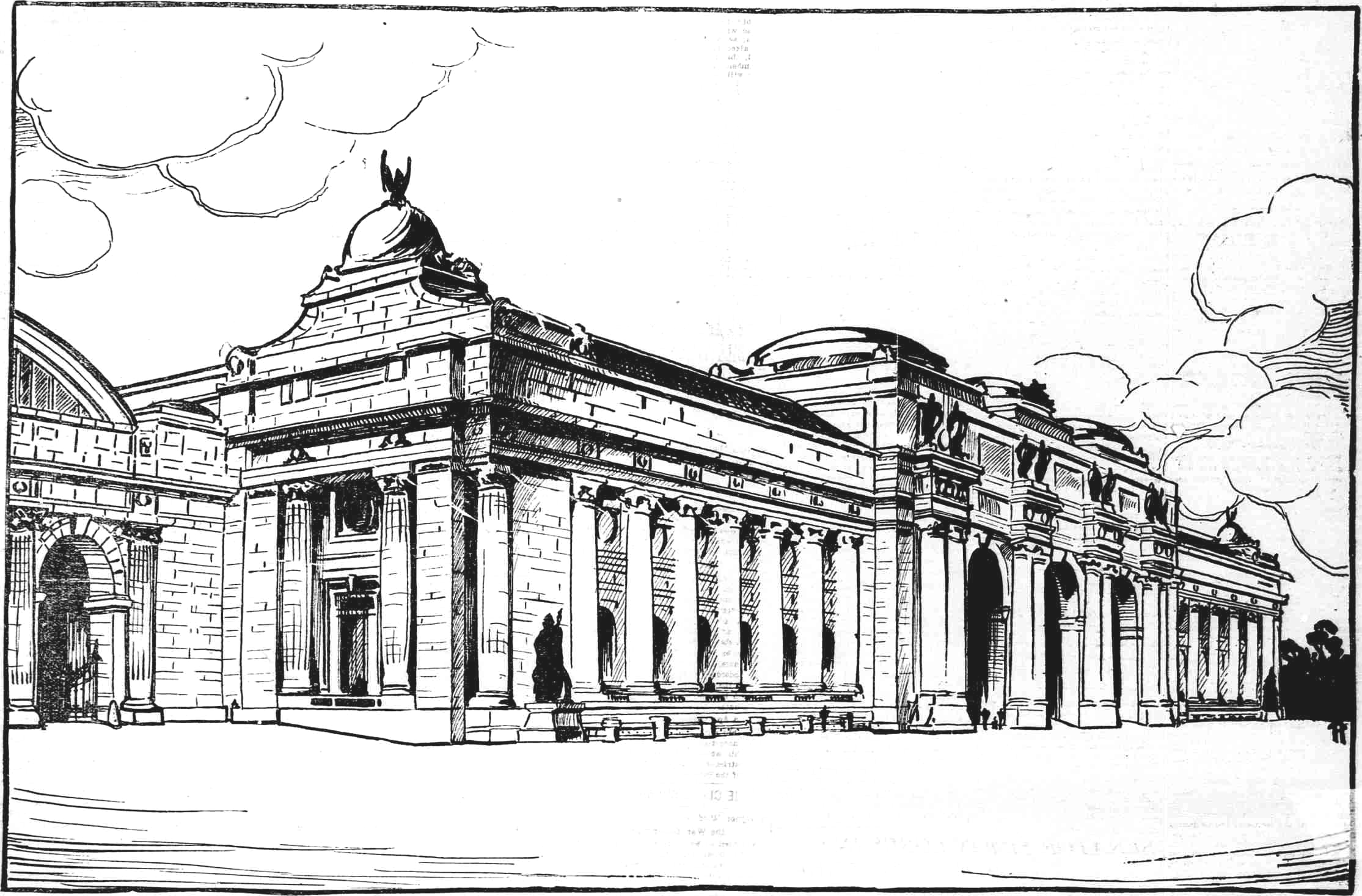
A 1902 drawing of a proposal for the design of Union Station

Union Station in 1906 before its opening. Notice the absence of the Columbus Fountain

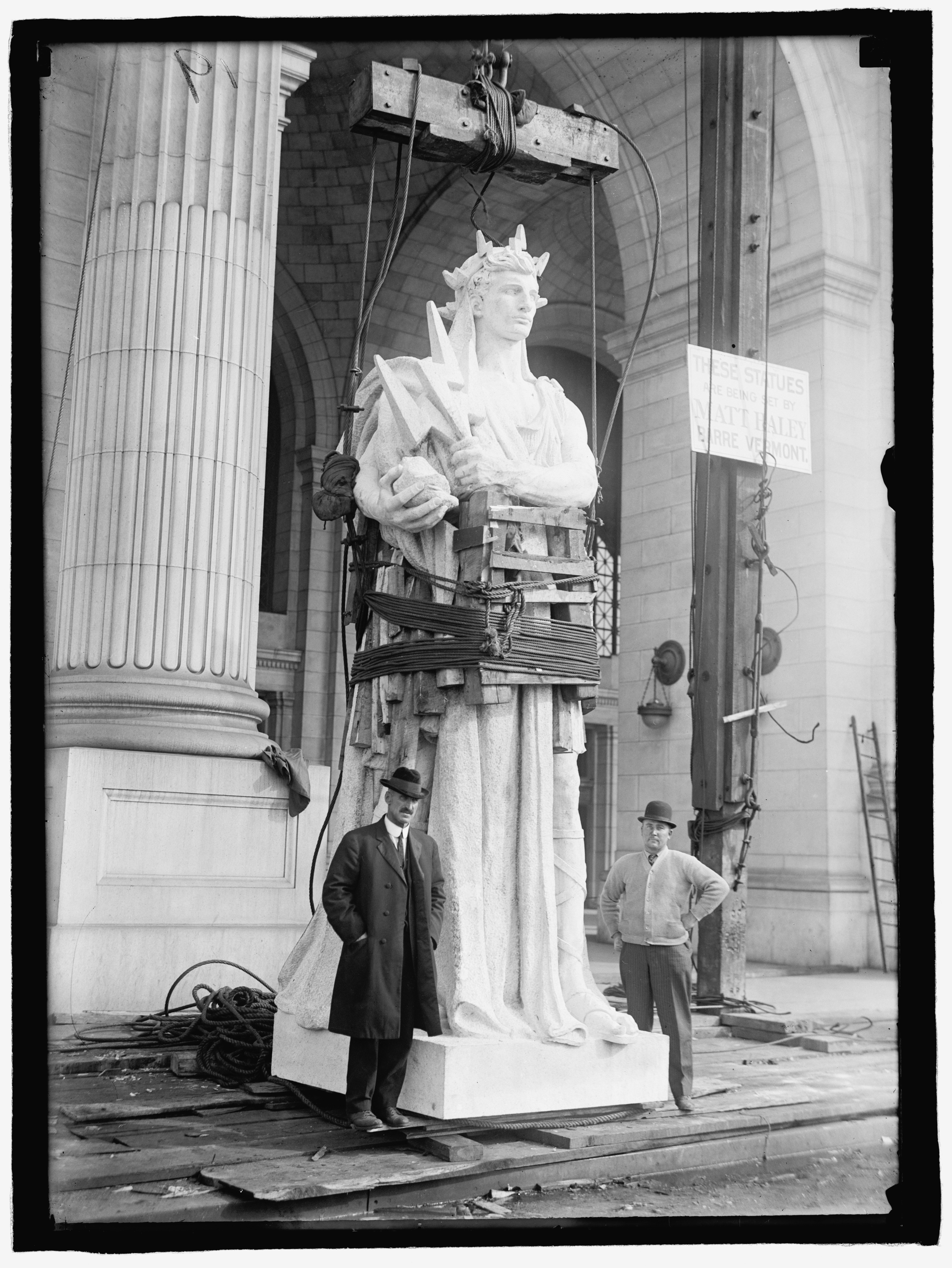
Statue of Thales representing electricity being hoisted up

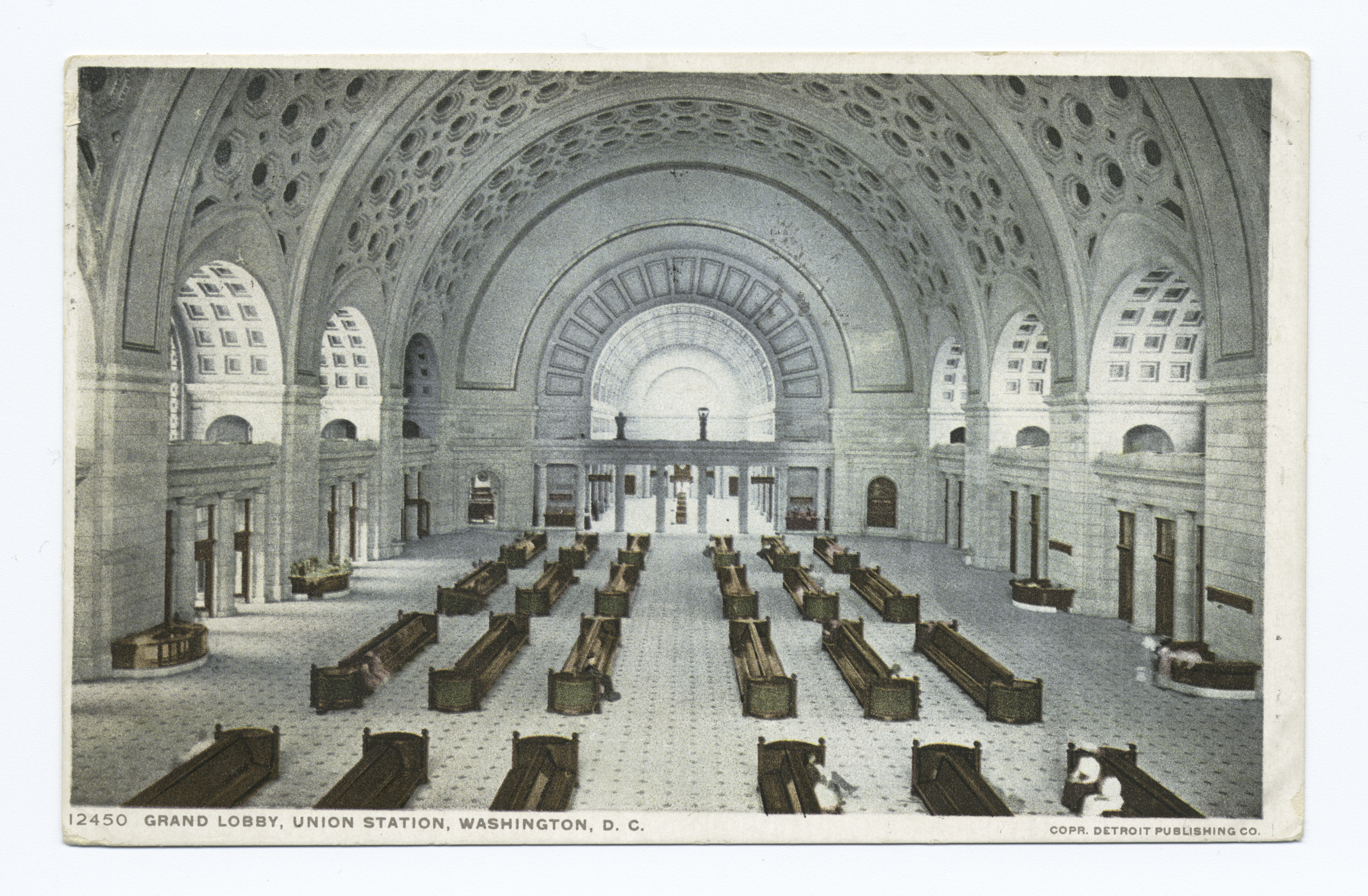
Interior, Waiting Room ca. 1915

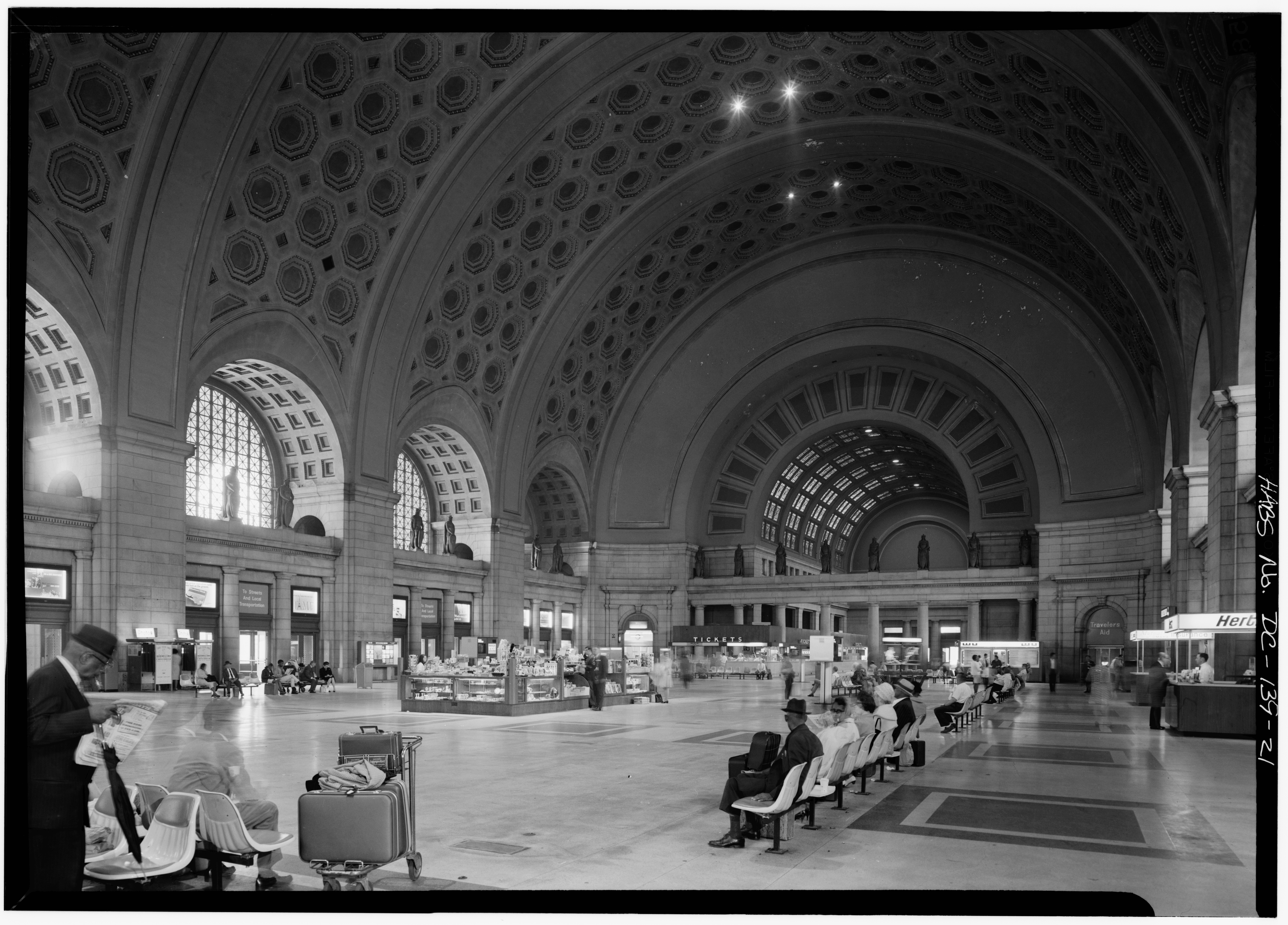
Union Station's interior waiting room.

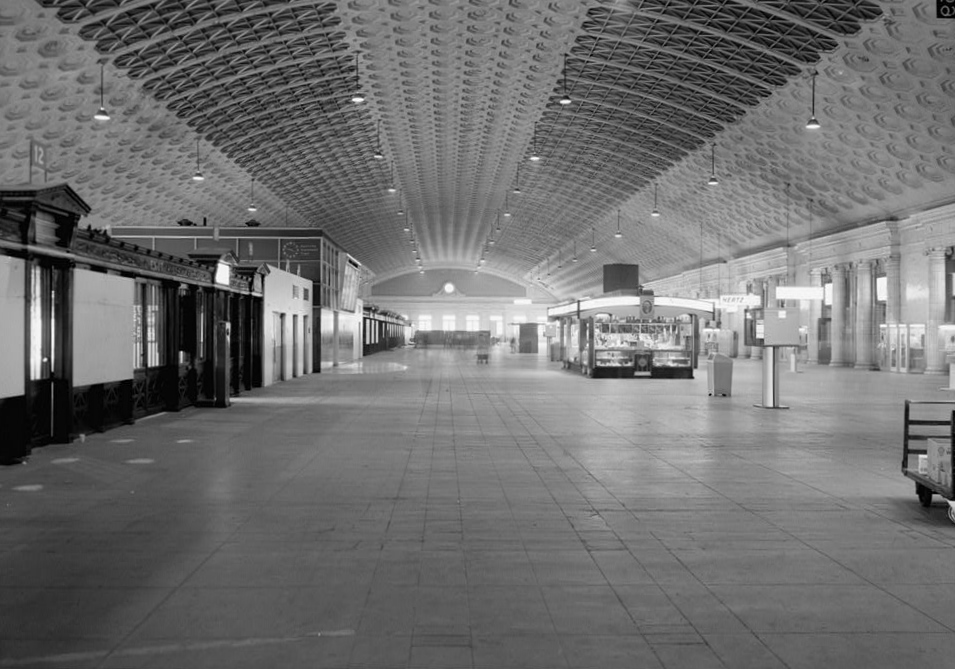
Interior of Union Station train concourse from West

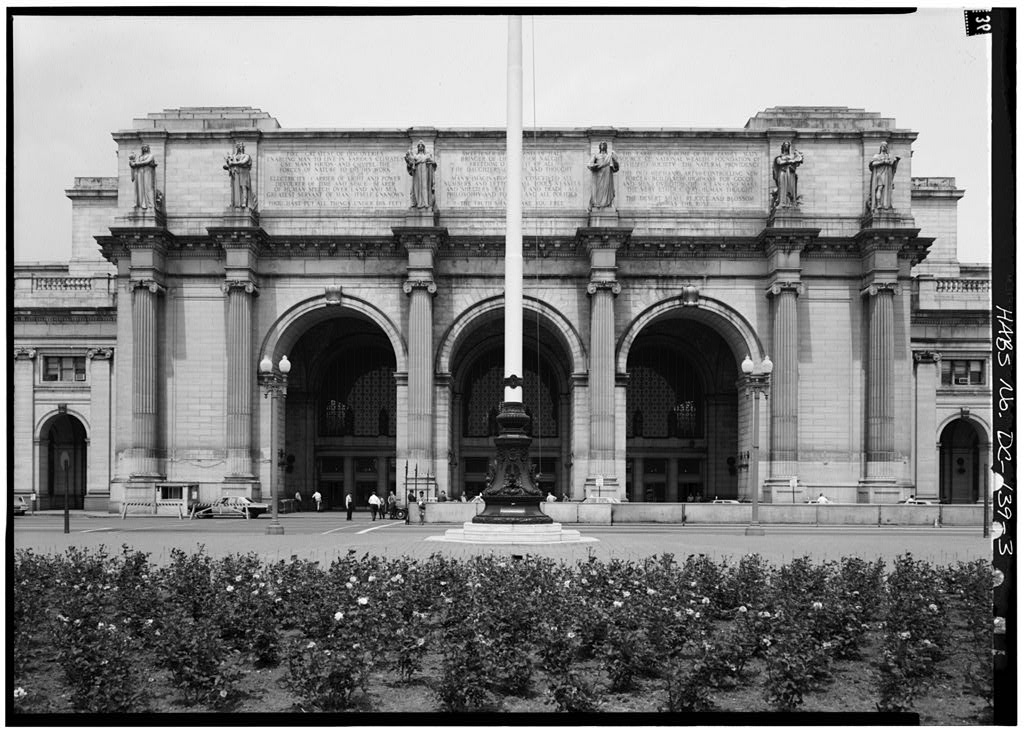
South Front Entrance, 1968

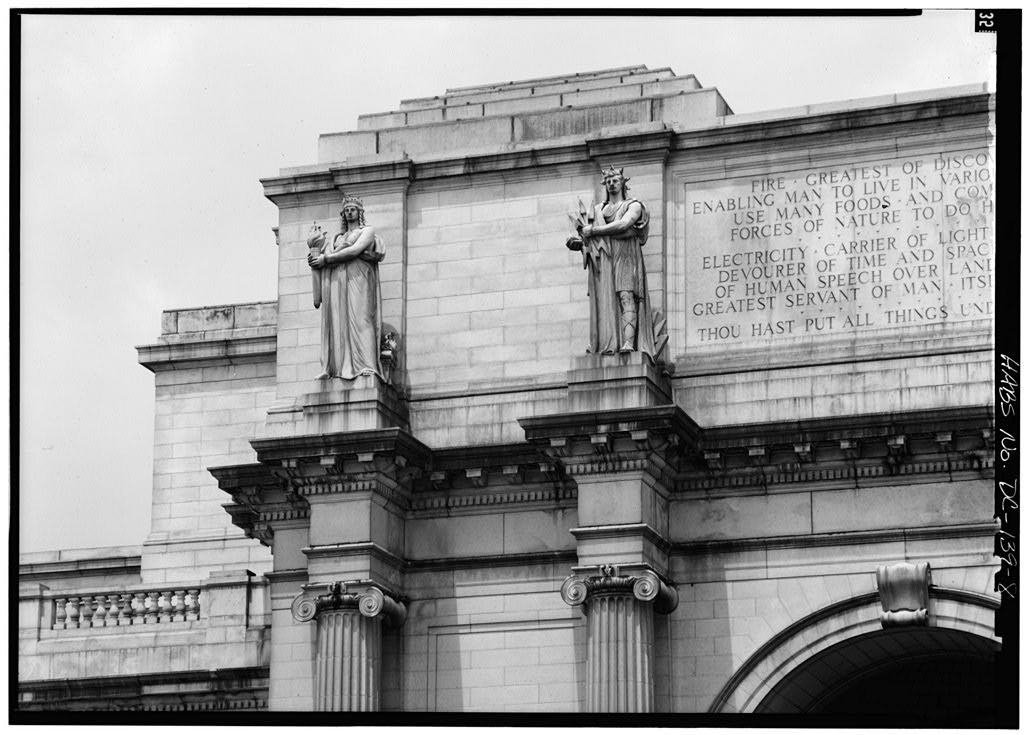
Detail of the west end of the main entrance pavilion, showing statuary and inscription

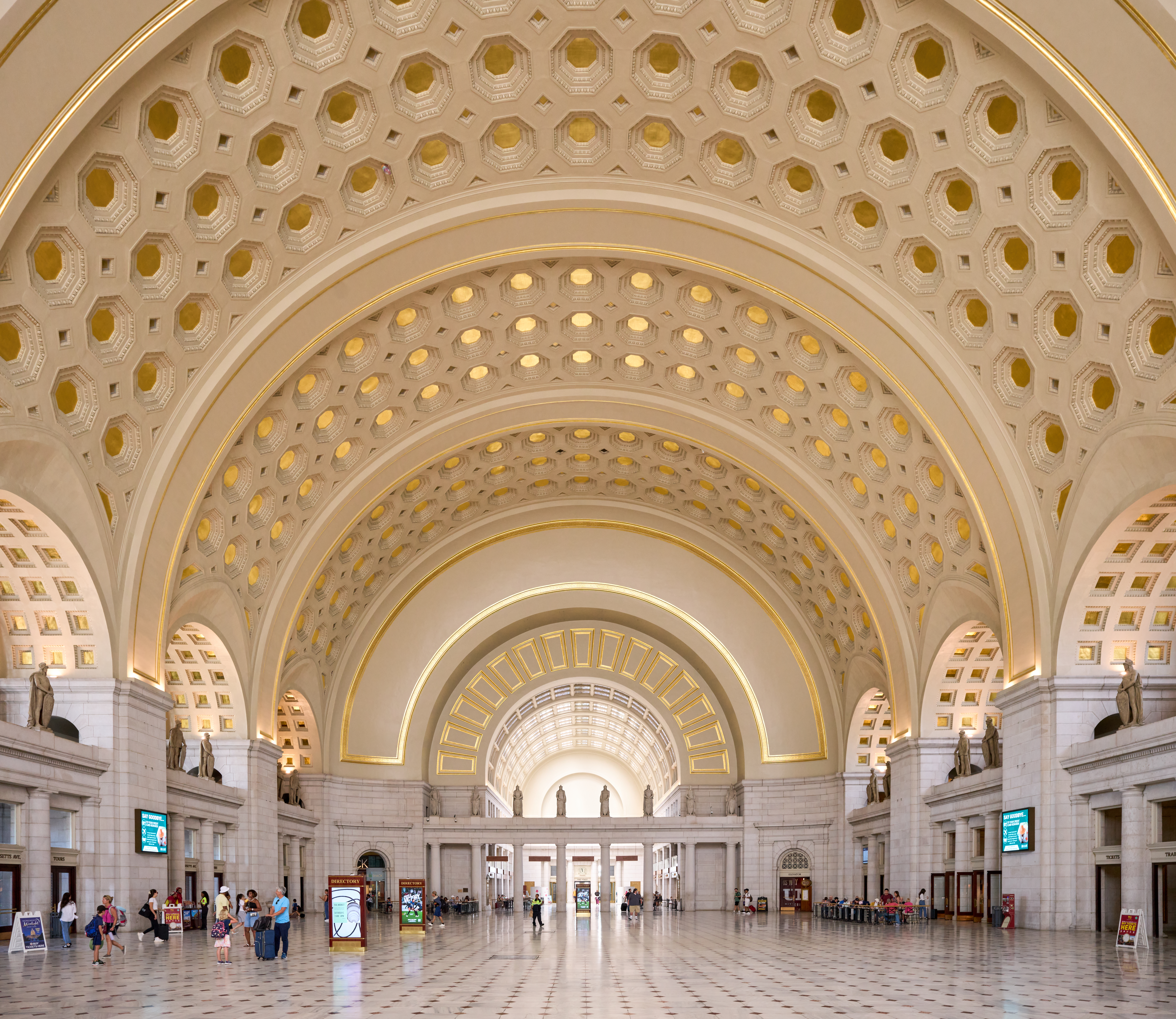
Great Hall in June 2024

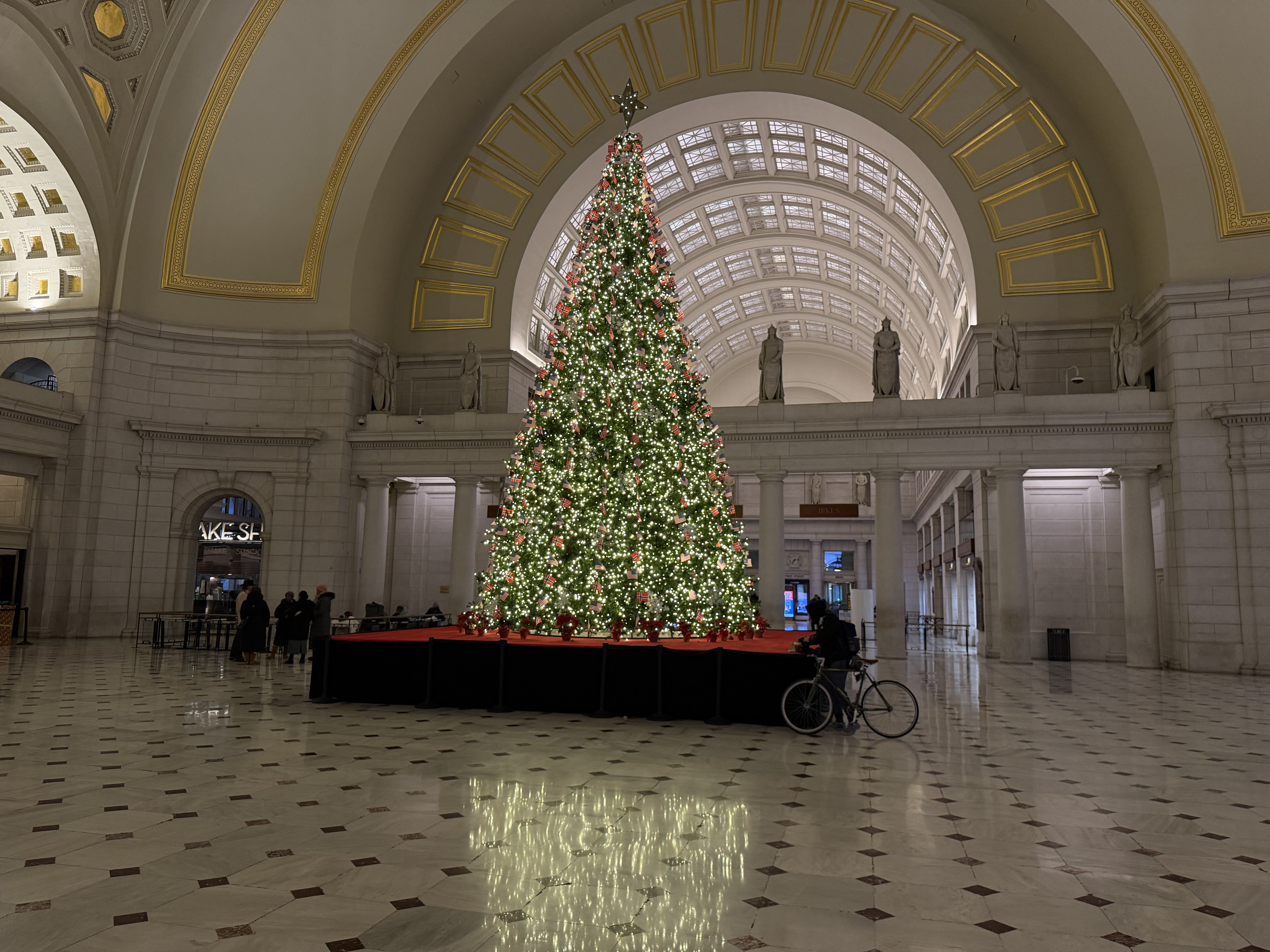
Great Hall in December 2025

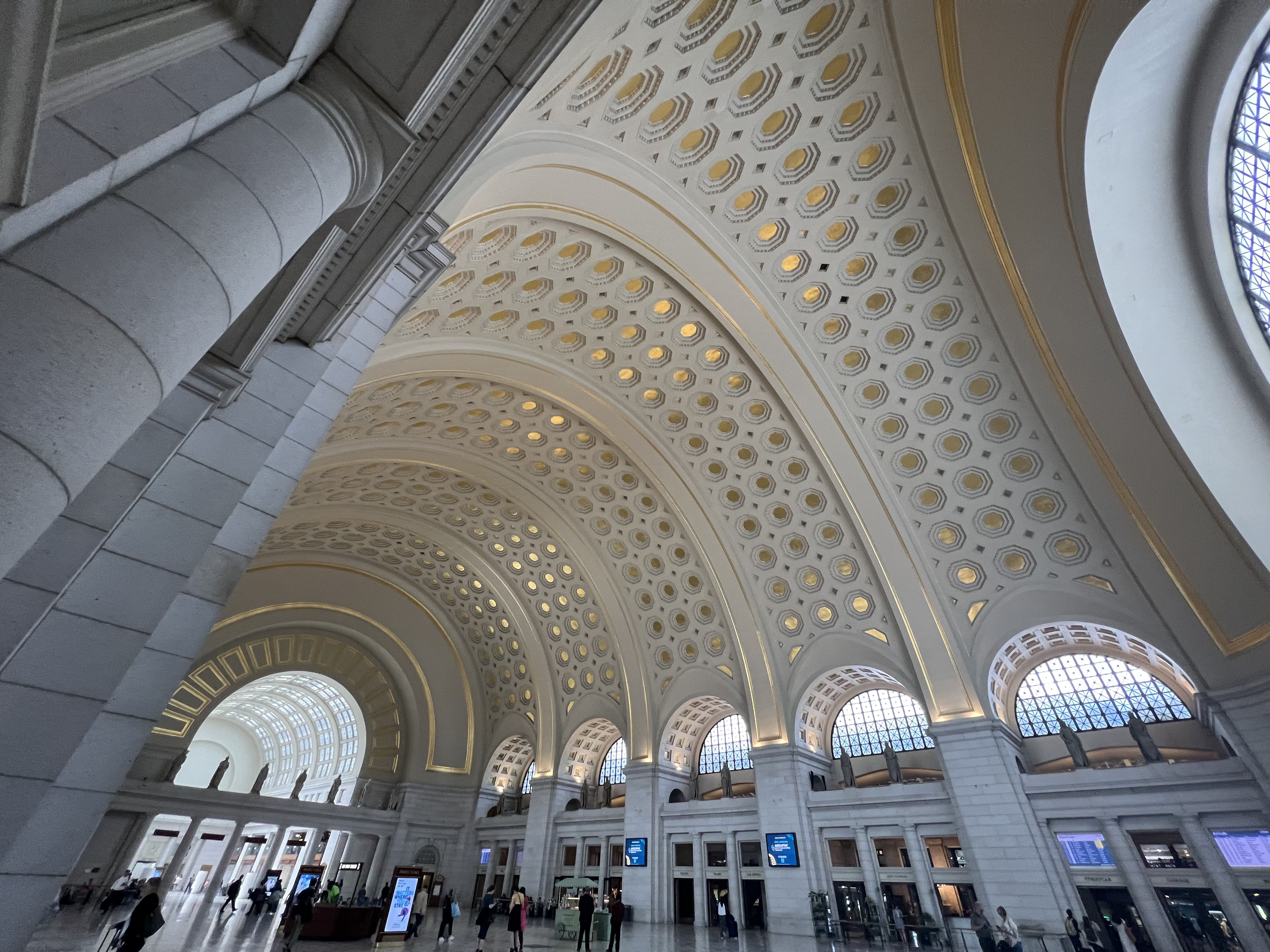
Ceiling of the great hall in May 2023

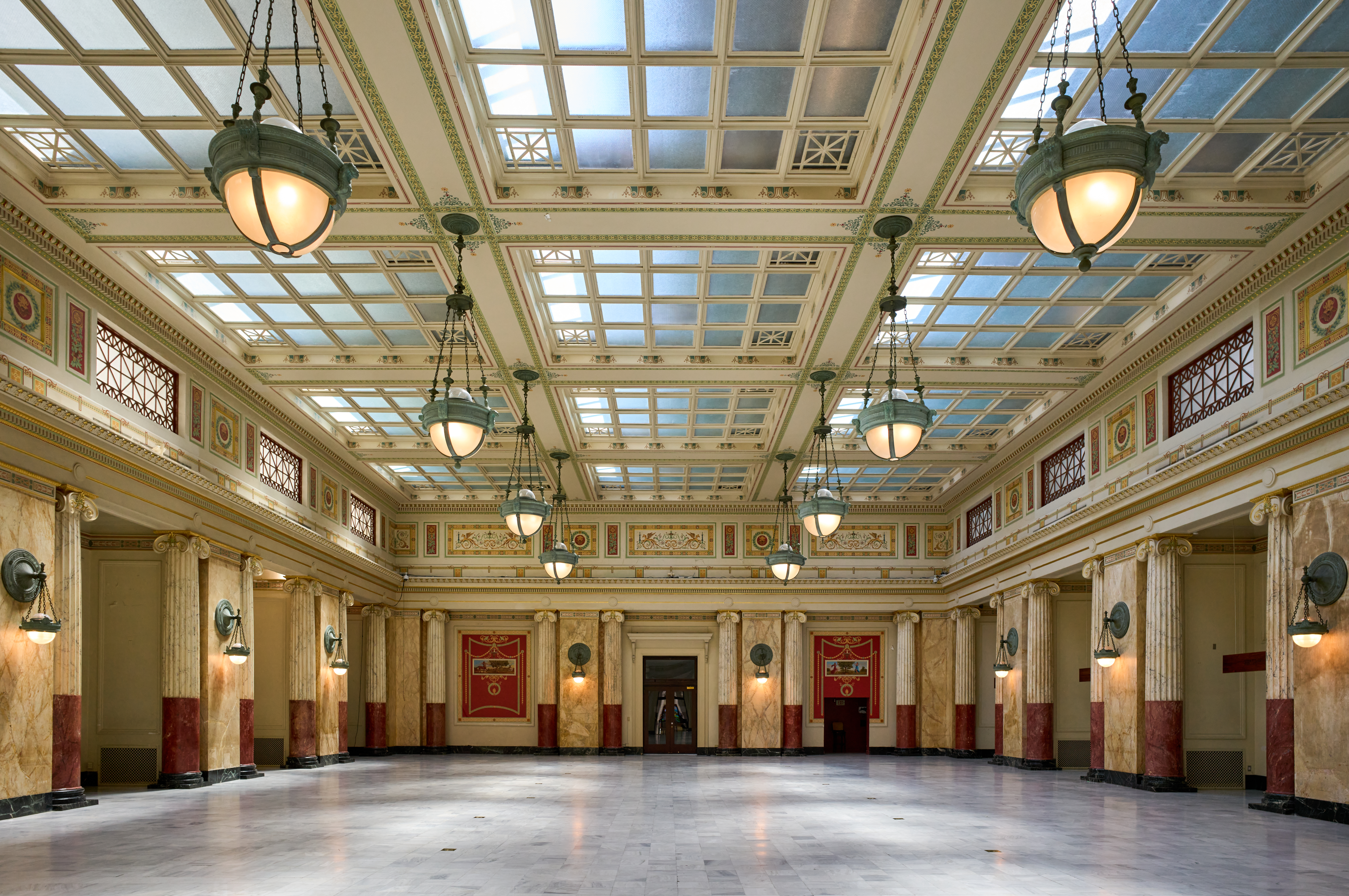
East Hall in June 2024

== See also ==
- Freedom Bell, American Legion, an artwork installed in front of Union Station
- List of busiest railway stations in North America
- Norwegian Christmas Tree in Washington, D.C.
