= National Visitor Center =

Attempt to redevelop Washington DC Union Station

Coordinates: 38.89731°N 77.00626°W

The ill-fated "National Visitor Center" slide-show area, dug beneath the floor of Washington, D.C.'s Union Station before a wholesale restoration in the 1980s

The National Visitor Center was an ill-fated attempt to repurpose Washington, D.C.'s Union Station as an information center for tourists visiting the United States Capitol and other Washington attractions. It opened for the Bicentennial celebrations in 1976, but it was never able to attract enough crowds to sustain its operating costs, and it closed in 1978.

== Conception and construction ==
As American railroad travel declined in the years after World War II, Union Station fell into financial and physical disrepair, losing much of its former glory as "one of Washington's grandest public spaces" and leading to discussion of alternative uses for the building. In 1958, the Baltimore and Ohio Railroad (B&O) and the Pennsylvania Railroad considered giving away the station or tearing it down and replacing it with an office building. In the early 1960s, government proposals to convert the station into a cultural center or a railroad museum were rejected.

In 1967, the chairman of the U.S. Civil Service Commission expressed interest in using Union Station as a visitor center during the upcoming U.S. Bicentennial celebrations. The notion found a strong supporter in U.S. Representative Kenneth J. Gray. In 1968, Congress passed the National Visitor Center Facilities Act toward this end. President Lyndon B. Johnson signed the act into law to create a "central clearinghouse where a visitor can gather information about our many monuments, museums, and Government buildings". On March 12, 1968, the center was authorized into the hands of the National Park Service.

The original 1967 agreement stipulated that Union Station's owners would pay $16 million for the renovation of the Visitor Center and the construction of the parking garage. When completed, it would then be leased to the government. In 1969, however, the Washington, D.C. City Planning Commission proposed that facilities for an intermodal terminal—combining trains, intercity buses, and local buses—should be included in the renovation. Years later, this change was cited as the turning point for cascading construction delays: it was now impossible to complete the project for $16 million. Progress was slowed by lawsuits, issues with contracts, and battles among Amtrak and the other railroads involved, Congress, the National Park Service, the Federal Railroad Administration, the Department of the Interior, and the Department of Transportation. Construction finally began in May 1974, and was rushed due to being behind schedule.

== Features ==
Reconstruction of the station included outfitting the famous Main Hall, with its 90-foot ceilings, with a recessed pit to display "Welcome to Washington", an expensive slide show presentation. A video recreation of this presentation may now be searched for and found on YouTube. This was officially the PAVE - the Primary Audio-Visual Experience, produced by the joint output of 80 Kodak Carousel slide projectors behind 80 screens, but was sarcastically referred to as "the Pit". Ironically the chief architect had intended that this viewing area would "...not offend the integrity of the architecture." The visitor center was planned to have two levels. Visitors would enter at the basement level and pass through the theaters and exhibits. They would then transition upward by the Pit escalators to the main floor. Ultimately, Congress never funded the basement level, and a new architect had the basement walls closed in. The already-installed escalators were too expensive to remove and were left in place.

The center also featured two 175-seat movie theaters, multilingual information desks, an exhibit on first ladies, a Hall of States, a new parking garage, and a bookstore.

== Opening and quick decline ==
The entire project was completed, save for the parking garage, and opening ceremonies were held on July 4, 1976. But the expected large Bicentennial crowds failed to materialize.

Time did not help; due to a lack of publicity and convenient parking, the National Visitor Center was never popular. To some, the problem was more basic; Senator Daniel Patrick Moynihan said, "What is the point of looking at slides of the U.S. Capitol when you can walk out the front door and see it?" By May 1978, the parking garage was still only half complete. On some days, there were only a few dozen tourists who used the center. Two 175-seat movie theaters in the center played the film City Out of Wilderness to small handfuls of people. Total National Park Service expenditures for the National Visitor Center eventually ran to over $100 million, and Congress held some 20 hearings about the project. The Pit, whose slide show was by now frequently turned off, became emblematic of the whole center's failure.

The lack of crowds meant the center could not sustain its operation. Financial considerations caused the National Park Service to close the theaters, end the slideshow presentation in "the Pit", and lay off almost three-quarters of the center's staff on October 28, 1978.

== Union Station afterward ==
With the visitor center closed, the physical condition of the structure worsened. The conversion had failed to address critical infrastructure within the 70-year-old building, such as its roof integrity and the electrical, plumbing, and heating systems. Parts of the roof collapsed and rain damage ensued, toadstools grew inside the main hall, and the whole station was sealed shut in 1981. Congress decided to save it by act, and control over the entity was transferred from the National Park Service to the Department of Transportation on December 29, 1981. Contractors soon covered over the unloved Pit, completed and expanded the unfinished parking garage, and refurbished the basement movie theaters. Union Station was eventually restored, expanded, and reopened in 1988 as both a busy train station and a popular commercial retail area.

In retrospect, the National Visitor Center was viewed as a classic case of "federal tinkering" gone bad, "one of Washington's major embarrassments" and an idea that "failed miserably ... [and] closed in disgrace". Along with the new parking garage, one National Park Service historian later wrote sardonically that the primary legacy of the National Visitor Center was "100 surplus Carousels".

== See also ==
- United States Capitol Visitor Center
