= Mayfair-Hillcrest Line =

C35
- Mayfair-Hillcrest Line

Overview
- System: Metrobus
- Operator: Washington Metropolitan Area Transit Authority
- Garage: Andrews Federal Center
- Livery: Local
- Status: Active
- Began service: June 21, 2015
- Predecessors: U7

Route
- Locale: Northeast, Southeast, Prince George's County
- Communities served: Deanwood, Kenilworth, Mayfair, Parkside, Central Northeast, Greenway, Fort Dupont, Hillcrest, Temple Hills
- Start: Deanwood station
- Via: Kenilworth Avenue Service Road NE, Hayes/Jay Streets NE, Minnesota Avenue NE/SE, Branch Avenue SE
- End: Naylor Road station (Weekdays & Sundays); Fort Dupont (Saturdays)
- Length: 60 Minutes

Service
- Level: Daily
- Frequency: 20 Minutes (Weekdays); 30 Minutes (Weekends & Late Nights)
- Operates: 4:40 AM – 12:16 AM
- Ridership: 411,074 (FY 2024)
- Timetable: Mayfair-Hillcrest Line

The Mayfair-Hillcrest Line Line, designated Route C35, is a daily bus route operated by the Washington Metropolitan Area Transit Authority between Deanwood station of the Orange and Silver Lines of the Washington Metro and Naylor Road station of the Green Line of the Washington Metro via Fort Dupont. Saturday service operates between Deanwood station and Fort Dupont only. The line operates every 20 minutes during the weekdays and every 30 minutes during late nights and weekends.

== Background ==
Route C35 operates between Deanwood and Naylor Road stations weekdays and Sundays via Minnesota Avenue station, Mayfair, and Fort Dupont. Saturday service operates between Deanwood station and Fort Dupont only. Route C35 operates out of Andrews Federal Center division.

== History ==
During WMATA's Fiscal Year of 2015, they announced a series of proposals of simplification affecting the current routes U2, U4, U5, U6, U8, V7, V8, and V9.

At the time of the proposals, the routes were suffering from on-time performances, and several bus bunching on the routes.

=== U2, V7, V8, V9 ===
For routes U2, V7, V8, V9, it goes as the following:

- Route U2 will have daily service at all times between Capitol Heights station and Anacostia station via the current U8 route between Capitol Heights station and Minnesota Avenue station via Nannie Helen Burroughs Avenue, then via the current U2 route to Anacostia station.
- Routes V7, V8: Daily service at all times between Capitol Heights station and Navy Yard–Ballpark station via the current U8 route between Capitol Heights station and Minnesota Avenue station, then via the current V7 route to Navy Yard Ballpark station. The routing between Deanwood Station and Minnesota Avenue stations will be replaced by a proposed route U4 re-route.
- Route V9: Peak period service between Benning Heights and Bureau of Engraving via the current V9 route between Benning Heights and Navy Yard Ballpark station, then via the current V7 route to Bureau of Engraving.

The reason for the changes was for enhance connectivity between points of regional demand, create a better balance of capacity and demand lines serving the Minnesota Avenue, and reduce or eliminate service with low productivity on the line. According to WMATA. there will be approximately 700 of 5,300 weekday passenger trips (13%), 750 of 3,200 Saturday passenger trips (23%) and 600 of 2,900 Sunday passenger trips (21%) that will be affected by shortening routes V7 and V8 at Navy Yard Station if the changes occur. Weekday passengers affected may be less due to the proposed extension of route V9.

=== U4 ===
For route U4, it goes as the following:

- Route U4 will have daily service at all times between River Terrace and Deanwood Station on its current route between River Terrace and Minnesota Avenue station, then operate along the current route of V7 and V8 from Minnesota Avenue to Deanwood stations.
- Route U4 would no longer serve the portion of the current route between Minnesota Avenue station and Sheriff Road having it replaced by a new route U7.

This rerouting was to create a better balance of capacity and demand on lines serving the Minnesota Avenue station.

=== U5, U6 ===
For routes U5, U6, it goes as the following:

- Routes U5, U6 would have daily service at all times via the portion of the current route between Minnesota Avenue station and Marshall Heights and Lincoln Heights. Service to Mayfair will be discontinued.
- A new Route U1 would serve the portion of the current routes between Minnesota Avenue station and Mayfair and Parkside.

The rerouting was to improve reliability of service by operating shorter routes and create a better balance of capacity and demand throughout the line. Performance measures has an on-time performance is 78 percent compared to the target of 81 percent.

=== Changes ===
In June 2015, WMATA announced a series of changes that'll affect the current U2, U4, U5, U6, U8, V7, V8, and V9.

WMATA created the Deanwood–Minnesota Ave Line with a route designation U7 on June 21, 2015. This new route will operate between Deanwood station and Minnesota Avenue station along Kenilworth Avenue Service Road. This route replaced a portion of routes V7 and V8 which were discontinued on the same day. The new route will provide service along Kenilworth Avenue Service Road in order to improve on time performance to new routes V2 and V4.

Also routes U2, V7, and V8 were replaced by routes V2 and V4, V9 was renamed route V1, and U8 was shortened from Capitol Heights station to Minnesota Avenue station.

During WMATA 2019 Fiscal Year, it was proposed to extended route U7 to Mayfair along the U5, U6 routing similar to the FY2015 budget proposal and U and V line study in 2015. It was also proposed for route U7 to be extend service from the Minnesota Ave station to the intersection of Minnesota Avenue & Ridge Road SE between 9 a.m. and 4 p.m. weekdays, and 7 a.m. and 7 p.m. on Saturdays to provide connections to the Minnesota Avenue shopping corridor. The changes were to retain direct connections between Mayfair and Parkside, Minnesota Ave station, and the Minnesota Avenue shopping corridor during the primary shopping hours and to improve productivity by rerouting and extending Route U7 to serve moderate to high density residential and commercial corridors as route U7 only have service along the Kenilworth Avenue service road.

Performance measures according to WMATA goes as the following as of the FY2016 budget:

| Performance Measure | Route U7 | WMATA Guideline | Pass/Fail |
|---|---|---|---|
| Average Weekday Riders | 761 | 432 | Pass |
| Cost Recovery | 12% | 16.6% | Fail |
| Subsidy per Rider | $3.69 | $4.81 | Pass |
| Riders per Trip | 7 | 10.7 | Fail |
| Riders per Revenue Mile | 3.6 | 1.3 | Pass |

On June 24, 2018, route U7 was rerouted along Kenilworth Terrace, Foote Street, Barnes Street, Hayes Street, and Jay Street to serve Mayfair to replace the U5, U6 which were shorten to Minnesota Avenue station. Also, route U7 was extended from Minnesota Avenue station along Minnesota Avenue to serve Greenway during the Weekday midday and all day Saturday.

During the COVID-19 pandemic, Route U7 was reduced to operate on its Saturday supplemental schedule during the weekdays beginning on March 16, 2020. On March 18, 2020, the line was further reduced to operate on its Sunday schedule. Weekend service was later suspended on March 21, 2020. Additional service and weekend service was restored on August 23, 2020, including service back to Greenway.

In February 2021 during WMATA's FY2022 budget crisis, WMATA proposed to eliminate the U7 section between Deanwood station and Greenway beginning in January 2022. Subsequently on April 22, 2021, WMATA approved the FY2022 budget and received federal funding to avoid service cuts.

Due to rising cases of the COVID-19 Omicron variant, the line was reduced to its Saturday service on weekdays. Full weekday service resumed on February 7, 2022.

In 2024 during WMATA's FY2024 Budget crisis, WMATA proposed to eliminate all U7 service. However on April 25, 2024, Metro’s Board of Directors approved a $4.8 billion capital and operating budget which avoided service cuts.

=== Better Bus Redesign ===
In 2022, WMATA launched its Better Bus Redesign project, which aimed to redesign the entire Metrobus Network and is the first full redesign of the agency's bus network in its history.

In April 2023, WMATA launched its Draft Visionary Network. As part of the drafts, WMATA proposed to extend the U7 from Minnesota Avenue station/Greenway to Naylor Road station via Fort Dupont, Ridge Road SE, 37th Street SE, Ely Place SE, Minnesota Avenue SE, and Branch Avenue SE, taking over portions of the current U6. The line would be named Route DC221.

During WMATA's Revised Draft Visionary Network, WMATA renamed the DC221 to Route C35 and was modified to loop in Fort Dupont instead of operating on Ely Place SE to/from Naylor Road station. All changes were then proposed during WMATA's 2025 Proposed Network.

During the proposals, the extension to Naylor Road station would only operate during the weekday peak hours only, with off-peak and all weekend service terminating in Fort Dupont.

On November 21, 2024, WMATA approved its Better Bus Redesign Network.

Beginning on June 29, 2025, the U7 was renamed into the C35, keeping its same routing except the route would now serve the former U6 loop in Greenway. Weekday peak hour service was extended to Naylor Road station via Minnesota Avenue SE and Branch Avenue SE.

In March 2026 during WMATA FY2027 budget proposal, WMATA proposed to extend all off-peak C35 trips from Fort Dupont to Naylor Road station. Subsequently the proposal was approved on April 23, 2026.

On June 21, 2026, all C35 trips during the weekdays and Sundays were extended from Fort Dupont to Naylor Road station. All Saturday trips operate between Deanwood station and Fort Dupont.
