= Lincoln Heights-Potomac Avenue Line =

C37
- Lincoln Heights-Potomac Avenue Line

Overview
- System: Metrobus
- Operator: Washington Metropolitan Area Transit Authority
- Garage: Shepherd Parkway
- Livery: Local
- Status: Active
- Began service: 1966
- Predecessors: M6, U5, U6

Route
- Locale: Northeast, Southeast
- Communities served: Dupont Park, Fairfax Village, Benning Heights, Lincoln Heights, Fort Dupont, Capitol View, Marshall Heights
- Landmarks served: Potomac Avenue station, Marshall Heights, Lincoln Heights, Capitol View, Benning Road station, Greenway, Minnesota Avenue station
- Start: Minnesota Avenue station
- Via: Minnesota Avenue NE, Ridge Road SE, Texas Avenue SE, East Capitol Street, Southern Avenue, Pennsylvania Avenue SE
- End: Potomac Avenue station
- Length: 45 minutes

Service
- Level: Daily
- Frequency: 15-20 minutes (Between 7:00 AM to 9:00 PM daily); 30 minutes (all other times)
- Operates: 4:30 AM - 2:00 AM
- Ridership: 425,176 (U5, FY 2024); 407,815 (U6, FY 2024)
- Transfers: SmarTrip only
- Timetable: Lincoln Heights-Potomac Avenue Line

The Lincoln Heights-Potomac Avenue Line, designated Route C37, is a daily bus route operated by the Washington Metropolitan Area Transit Authority between Minnesota Avenue station of the Orange and Silver Lines of the Washington Metro and Potomac Avenue station of the Blue, Orange and Silver Lines of the Washington Metro. The line operates via Marshall Heights and Lincoln Heights every 15–20 minutes between 7:00 AM-9:00 PM daily and 30 minutes all other times.

== Route Description ==
Route C37 provides service in Northeast and Southeast Washington in Marshall Heights, Lincoln Heights, Benning Heights, Greenway, Fairfax Village, and Dupont Park via Minnesota Avenue, Ridge Road, Texas Avenue, East Capitol Street, Southern Avenue and Pennsylvania Avenue SE.

Route C37 operates out of Shepherd Parkway division.

== History ==
U5 & U6 originally operated as part of the "Mayfair-Marshall Heights" D.C. Transit System Bus Line. U5 & U6 eventually became WMATA Metrobus Routes on February 4, 1973, when WMATA acquired all four bus companies that operated throughout the Washington D.C. Metropolitan Area and merged them all together to form its own, "Metrobus" System while keeping their same routing.

On December 3, 1978, both routes U5 and U6 went through a minor rerouting change, to divert into the newly opened Minnesota Avenue station.

On November 22, 1980, both routes U5 and U6 began serving Benning Road station. Both U5 & U6 would serve the station at the intersection of East Capitol Street NE & Benning Road NE/SE.

In WMATA's FY2015 budget proposal, WMATYA proposed to shorten Routes U5 and U6 from Mayfair to Minnesota Avenue station, having Mayfair service replaced by a new route U1. The reasons were to improve reliability of service by operating shorter routes, create a better balance of capacity and demand throughout the line, and performance measures has an on-time performance is 78 percent compared to the target of 81 percent.

The study was brought up again during WMATA's FY2019 budget. Routes U5 and U6 would end at Minnesota Avenue station still with Mayfair service replaced by route U7. This was to improve service reliability and on-time performance by shortening the routes, create a better balance of capacity and customer demand on routes U5, U6, and U7, recommended in the 2014 U and V Lines Service Evaluation Study, and respond to Minnesota Avenue NE construction conclusion. Performance measures go as the following:

Performance Measure	Route U5, U6	WMATA Guideline	Pass/Fail
Average Weekday Riders	3233	432	Pass
Cost Recovery	18%	16.6%	Pass
Subsidy per Rider	$2.40	$4.81	Pass
Riders per Trip	45	10.7	Fail
Riders per Revenue Mile	4.4	1.3	Pass

On June 24, 2018, Route U5 and U6 discontinued service to Mayfair & Parkside being replaced by extended route U7. All trips now terminate at Minnesota Avenue station. The line was also renamed from Mayfair–Marshall Heights Line to the Marshall Heights Line.

During the COVID-19 pandemic, the line was reduced to operate on its Saturday supplemental schedule during the weekdays beginning on March 16, 2020. On March 18, 2020, the line was further reduced to operate on its Sunday schedule. Weekend service was later suspended on March 21, 2020. Additional service and weekend service was restored on August 23, 2020.

In February 2021 during WMATA's FY2022 budget crisis, WMATA proposed to add a late-night service to 2:00 AM on Route U5 beginning in July 2021, but beginning in January 2022, WMATA proposed to eliminate the U5 and U6 and replace it with a modified 96 and Route V2. Subsequently on April 22, 2021, WMATA approved the FY2022 budget and received federal funding to avoid service cuts.

On June 6, 2021, late-night service was increased to operate up to 2:00 AM on Route U5.

On June 10, 2021, WMATA proposed to increase the U5 and U6 to operate every 20 minutes daily between 7:00 AM to 9:00 PM daily as part of WMATA's Pandemic Recovery Plan.

On September 5, 2021, the line was increased to operate every 20 minutes daily.

Due to rising cases of the COVID-19 Omicron variant, the line was reduced to its Saturday service on weekdays. Full weekday service resumed on February 7, 2022.

=== Better Bus Redesign ===
In 2022, WMATA launched its Better Bus Redesign project, which aimed to redesign the entire Metrobus Network and is the first full redesign of the agency's bus network in its history.

In April 2023, WMATA launched its Draft Visionary Network. As part of the drafts, WMATA proposed to merge the U5 and U6 with the M6, operating the current U5 routing between Minnesota Avenue station and Marshall Heights, then operate along Southern Avenue, Benning Road, Marlboro Pike, Alabama Avenue SE, and 41st Street SE, and the M6 routing to Potomac Avenue station via Southern Avenue, Suitland Road SE, 38th Street SE, and Pennsylvania Avenue SE. The line would be named Route DC119. Service along 37th Street SE and Ely Place SE would be incorporated into the proposed DC221 (current Route U7).

During WMATA's Revised Draft Visionary Network, WMATA renamed the DC119 to Route C22 and majority kept its same routing, but would not operate along Benning Road and Marlboro Pike, instead remaining along Southern Avenue. The DC221 was also kept and renamed Route C35. All changes were then proposed during WMATA's 2025 Proposed Network.

During the proposals, Route C22 was renamed to Route C37 and kept its same routing.

On November 21, 2024, WMATA approved its Better Bus Redesign Network.

Beginning on June 29, 2025, the U5 was combined with the M6, operating the U5 route between Minnesota Avenue station and Marshall Heights, then operates along Texas Avenue, Ridge Road and Southern Avenue before reaching the M6 route along Southern Avenue. It then follows the M6 route to Potomac Avenue station via Pennsylvania Avenue SE. The line was renamed into the C37. The U6 routing in Fort Dupont was replaced by a rerouted U7 (renamed into the C35).

== Incidents ==
- On November 13, 2011, at around 6:30 AM, a man was shot twice on a U6 bus along 37th Street and Ridge Road. The victim was taken to a local hospital.
- On May 3, 2016, 30-year-old Keith James Loving hijacked a U6 bus along Minnesota and Nannie Helen Burroughs Avenues with needle nose pliers and drove the bus into a gas station parking lot killing 40-year-old Anthony Payne. Police later apprehend Loving and was later arrested and charged with murder. The U6 driver suffered minor back injuries while no passengers were injured. Keith Loving was later sentenced to 21 years in jail.
