= 19th Avenue station =

19th Avenue station may refer to:

== Phoenix, Arizona ==
- 19th Avenue/Camelback station, a light rail station
- 19th Avenue/Dunlap station, a light rail station
- Glendale/19th Avenue station, a light rail station
- Montebello/19th Avenue station, a light rail station
- Northern/19th Avenue station, a light rail station

== San Francisco, California ==
- 19th Avenue and Holloway station, a light rail station
- 19th Avenue and Junipero Serra station, a light rail stop
- 19th Avenue and Randolph station, a light rail stop
- Judah and 19th Avenue station, a light rail stop
- Taraval and 19th Avenue station, a light rail stop

== See also ==
- 19th Avenue
- 19th Street station
