= H Street Line =

Bus route in Washington D.C, United States

D20
- H Street Line

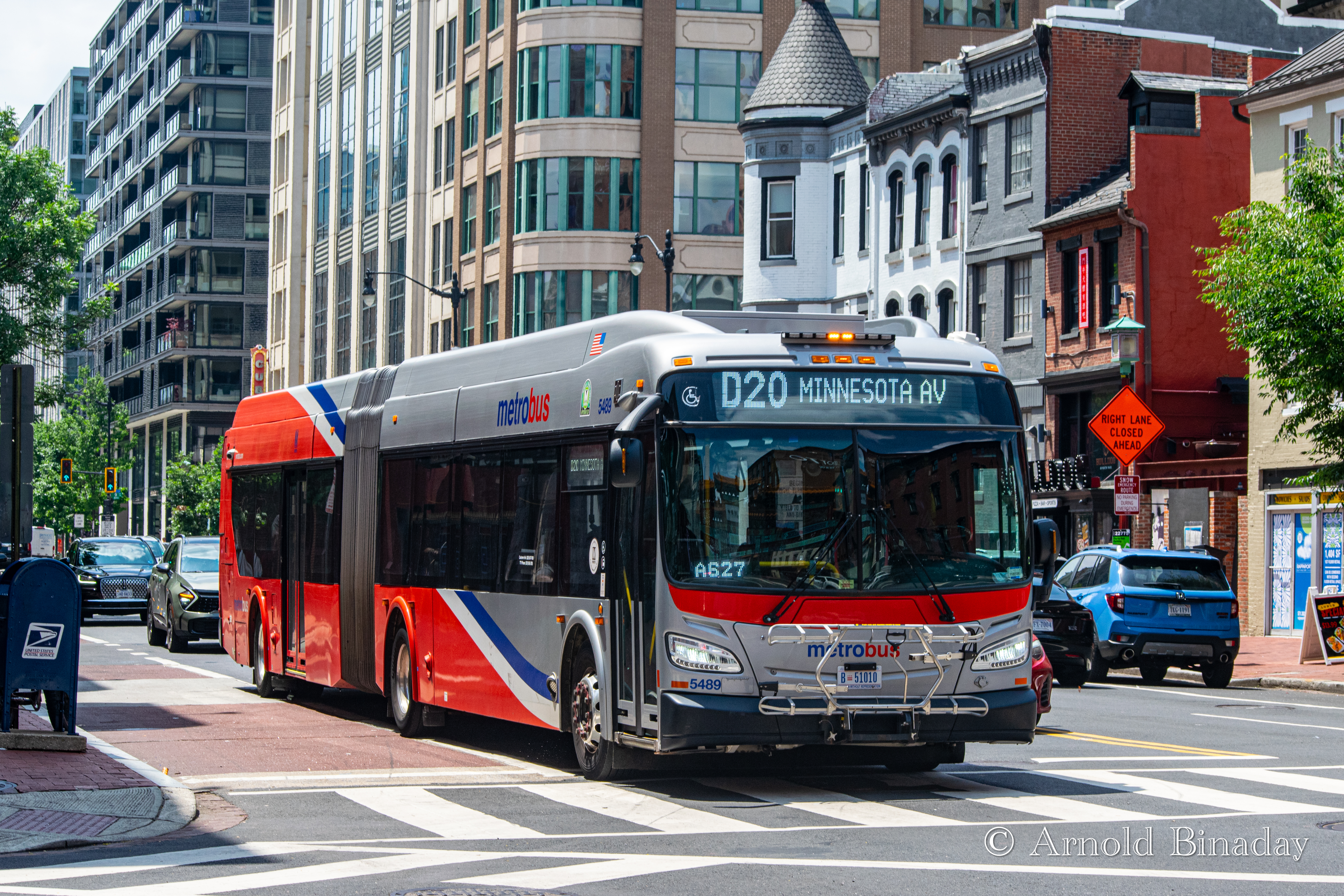
- Route D20 at Gallery Place-Chinatown

Overview
- System: Metrobus
- Operator: Washington Metropolitan Area Transit Authority
- Garage: Andrews Federal Center; Bladensburg (Late nights)
- Livery: Local
- Status: In Service
- Began service: 1920
- Predecessors: X2

Route
- Locale: Northwest, Northeast
- Communities served: Central Northeast, Downtown, Chinatown
- Landmarks served: Minnesota Avenue station, Benning Road, Hechinger Mall, H Street, Washington Union Station, Union Station, Government Publishing Office, Gallery Place station, Capital One Arena, Metro Center station, McPherson Square station, Franklin Square, White House, Lafayette Square, Farragut Square, Farragut West station, Farragut North station, Foggy Bottom station
- Start: Minnesota Avenue station
- Via: H Street NW/NE, Benning Road NE
- End: Farragut Square; Foggy Bottom station (Late Night & Early Morning)
- Other routes: D2X H Street Limited

Service
- Level: Daily
- Frequency: 10-12 minutes (7:00 AM - 9:00 PM); 15-20 minutes (Between 9:00 PM – 7:00 AM)
- Operates: 24 Hours
- Ridership: 3,493,072 (FY 2025)
- Transfers: SmarTrip only
- Timetable: Benning Road-H Street Line

The H Street Line, designated Route D20, is a daily bus route operated by the Washington Metropolitan Area Transit Authority between Minnesota Avenue station, which is served by the Orange and Silver Lines of the Washington Metro and Farragut Square in Downtown Washington. Late night and early morning trips are extended to Foggy Bottom station, which is served by the Blue, Orange and Silver Lines of the Washington Metro. The line operates every 10–12 minutes daily and 15–20 minutes during late nights. Trips are roughly 45 minutes long.

== Background ==
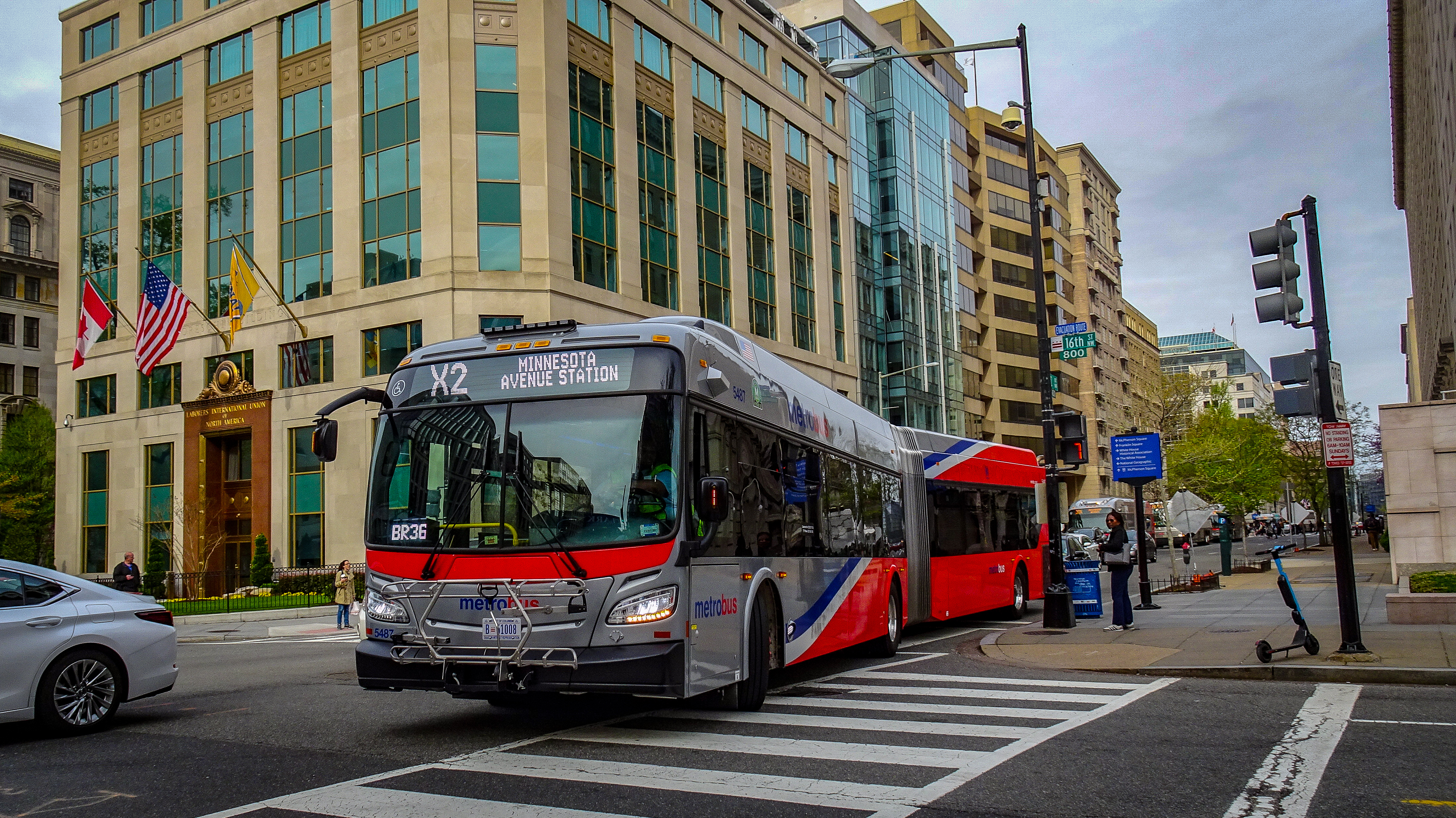
Former Route X2 at Lafayette Square

Route D20 operates daily between Minnesota Avenue station and Farragut Square during the daytime and extended to Foggy Bottom station during the late night and early morning hours, running every 10–15 minutes during the day and 20 minutes during the late nights, providing service along H Street and Benning Road. There were select trips that operate during school hours from Phelps Architecture, Construction and Engineering High School and Friendship Collegiate Academy Public Charter School. One trip operates to McPherson Square while four trips operate to Minnesota Avenue.

Route D20 is one of the most heavily used bus routes with an average of 12,000 riders as of June 2016, behind the 16th Street Lines and 14th Street Lines. Ridership on the D20 was also increasing due to development along the H Street and Benning Road corridor.

Route D20 operates out of Andrews Federal Center division, with late night trips operating out of Bladensburg division. It is one of the few bus routes to utilize articulated buses.

== History ==
Before WMATA implemented the Better Bus Redesign network, Route D20 was previously known as Route X2. Route X2 operates under portions of former streetcar lines route 10 which operated under the Washington Railway & Electric Company. The line was created in 1871 which were powered by Horse Trolleys. The line was later run by electric cars by 1895 and was electrified in 1899. The WR&E was later acquired by Capital Traction Company to form the Capital Transit Company in 1936. The line was later converted into bus on May 1, 1949 which was renamed into route X2.

Afterwards the DC Transit company took over operating buses along H Street and Benning Road. Then WMATA took over DC Transit on December 4, 1973 and incorporated the X1, X2, X3, X4, X5, X6, X7, X8, and X9.

Route X1 operated between Minnesota Avenue station and Potomac Park via Washington Union Station and Louisiana Avenue. Route X2 operated between Minnesota Avenue and Union station. Route X3 operated between Minnesota Avenue and McLean Gardens. Route X4 was a new route introduced on November 24, 1978 operating between Minnesota Avenue and Lafayette Square. Route X5 was designated as "Owl Trips" operating between Seat Pleasant, Maryland and Lafayette Square. Route X6 would operate between Lafayette Square and Mayfair. All these routes mostly operate along Benning Road and H Street.

Since 2016, the H Street/Benning Road Line of the DC Streetcar has operated along a portion of the X2's route. The streetcar increased total transit ridership on the corridor by 15%, without significantly affecting the X2's much higher ridership.

Through the years, route X2 went to major service changes on its route. Routes X4, X5, and X7 discontinued during the years, X6 became the National Arboretum Line running between the United States National Arboretum and Washington Union Station in the 1990s, and X1 and X3 remains as the Benning Road Line where route X2 was split into the Benning Road–H Street Line.

In January 1981, route X2 was extended to Capitol Heights station and X5 was shorten to Capitol Heights station. A new route X7 was created to operate on the old route X2 routing from 1978.

On December 28, 1991, route X2 was shortened back to Minnesota Avenue station but was extended to Lafayette Square in order to replace routes X4, X5, X6, and X7. Service to Capitol Heights station from Minnesota Avenue was replaced by route U8. Route X2 was also split from the Benning Road Line and formed to the "Benning Road-H Street Line". Short trips are also operated between Minnesota Avenue station and Gallery Place station only during the weekdays.

On June 25, 2017, route X2 was given a full 24/7 service due to earlier Metro closing during WMATA's FY2018 budget. At first, buses had a schedule gap of every 100 minutes between 2:30 and 4:10 am but now operates every 30 minutes.

On September 26, 2017 during WMATA's FY2018 budget, WMATA proposed to eliminate route X2 short trips to Gallery Place station and operate the full route to Lafayette Square. However, the frequency of buses will be reduced from every 8 minutes to every 10–12 minutes. This was due to the full length route and to adjust the time between midday X2 buses and proposed midday service to route X9. It was also due to create a better balance of capacity and demand throughout the Benning Road and H Street corridor with the implementation of midday route X9, expanded limited-stop MetroExtra hours of service in Northeast, responds to requests by the District Department of Transportation, and provide the ability to add service to route X9 which would provide a weekday midday transfer-free ride throughout the entire corridor between downtown DC and Capitol Heights station.

On June 24, 2018, all route X2 trips operate between Minnesota Avenue station and Lafayette Square with short trips to Gallery Place station being discontinued. However the frequency of buses were increased from 8 minutes to 10–12 minutes.

During the COVID-19 pandemic, route X2 was reduced to operate on its Saturday schedule beginning on March 16, 2020. On March 18, 2020, route X2 was further reduced to operate on its Sunday schedule. Also on March 21, 2020, route X2 was further reduced to operate every 30 minutes on the weekends. Route X2 reverted to its regular service on August 23, 2020 with post midnight trips still being suspended.

In February 2021 during WMATA's FY2022 budget crisis, WMATA proposed to add late-night service to 2:00 AM on Route X2 between July and December 2021 in the first half of the fiscal year, but would reduce it back to midnight between January to June 2022 in the second half of the fiscal year. Subsequently on April 22, 2021, WMATA approved the FY2022 budget and received federal funding to avoid service cuts.

On March 14, 2021, route X2 terminus was changed with westbound trips to terminate at McPherson Square station on 15th St NW (east) at K St NW. On May 29, 2022, Route X2 was changed to terminate back at its previous terminal at Lafayette Square.

On June 6, 2021, late-night service was increased to operate up to 2:00 AM on Route X2.

On June 10, 2021, WMATA proposed to increase the X2 to operate every 12 minutes daily between 7:00 AM to 9:00 PM daily as part of WMATA's Pandemic Recovery Plan. On September 5, 2021, the line was increased to operate every 12 minutes daily.

Due to rising cases of the COVID-19 Omicron variant, the line was reduced to its Saturday service on weekdays. Full weekday service resumed on February 7, 2022.

On December 17, 2023, new 24 hour service was added to Route X2.

=== Better Bus Redesign ===
In 2022, WMATA launched its Better Bus Redesign project, which aimed to redesign the entire Metrobus Network and is the first full redesign of the agency's bus network in its history.

In April 2023, WMATA launched its Draft Visionary Network. As part of the drafts, WMATA proposed to have two routes operate along H Street, as Route DC112 between Farragut Square and Capitol Heights station via H Street NE, Benning Road NE, and East Capitol Street, and Route DC113 between Gallery Place station/Metro Center station and Minnesota Avenue station via H Street NE, Benning Road NE, and Minnesota Avenue NE. These routes were essentially the X2 and X9 but with swapped eastern terminals.

During WMATA's Revised Draft Visionary Network, WMATA renamed the DC112 to Route D2X and have the route operate between Farragut Square and Capitol Heights, making limited stops weekdays only. WMATA also renamed the DC113 to Route D22 and have the route operate between Gallery Place station/Metro Center station and Minnesota Avenue station with late night service being extended to Foggy Bottom. All changes were then proposed during WMATA's 2025 Proposed Network.

During the proposals, Route D22 was renamed to Route D20 and was changed to swap terminals with the D2X with the D20 now operating to Farragut Square and the D2X terminating at Gallery Place station.

On November 21, 2024, WMATA approved its Better Bus Redesign Network, with service on the H Street Line being simplified.

Beginning on June 29, 2025, the X2 was renamed into the D20, keeping the same routing.

== Incidents ==
Route D20 and the former Route X2 is notorious for having a high crime rate on its buses, suffering from many cases of crimes and fare evasions on the route. Fare evasion is also a major concern for WMATA on route X2 losing $700,000 from riders which is third in most fare evasions behind the W4 and 92. In 2015, X2 riders called out to WMATA to improve the crime rate on the buses as the crime rate was increasing on the buses. The Metro Board began all its best to slow the crime on the route with examples are installing surveillance video monitors, employing undercover police officers, and adding new driver shields on newer bus orders. Also in 2017, WMATA drivers, supervisors and Local 689 union members protested at WMATA for unsafe conditions on the job and for better protection on the X2. Route X2 has the highest crime rate on any Metrobus route comparing it to routes in Southeast but has the crime rate decreased after added protection in 2017. Incidents and accidents are listed below.

- On June 23, 2013, an X2 bus driver and two female passengers got into an altercation where one of the female passengers reportedly threw a piece of paper at the driver and the driver hit the female passenger with "something sharp in his hands." According to the victim, the X2 driver looked at Anderson inappropriately at the start of their ride and told the victim upon exiting, “Don’t let your male tendencies think you’re a man”; and subsequently stood up and attacked the victim with hate and violence, repeatedly punching her outside of the bus and fracturing a couple of her fingers. The victim would later file a lawsuit against WMATA in 2015.
- On January 19, 2015, two men were shot inside an X2 bus after getting into an argument with another passenger between New Jersey Avenue and H Street NW. Bus camera footage shows the shooter exited the rear door of the bus and shot into the vehicle. The suspect was later arrested on January 21, 2015.
- On March 30, 2015, a person threw a brick at an X2 bus windshield at 19th Street and Benning Road NE injuring two people on board.
- On April 29, 2015, three juveniles exited the bus and one of the members threw a rock at an X2 bus rear door, shattering one of the glass panels also at 19th Street and Benning Road NE, but no injuries were reported. The three juveniles were later arrested by DC Police.
- On April 29, 2015, a man was arrested from an X2 bus after pulling out a knife to a woman after an argument they got into.
- On May 15, 2015, police arrested a man after he a assaulted another passenger on board an X2 bus.
- On November 12, 2015, an X2 bus and a DC Streetcar collided along H and 7th Streets NE. No injuries were reported.
- On June 2, 2017, a collision occurred between an X2 bus and the DC Streetcar injuring 10 people.
- On August 20, 2017, an X2 bus spun out of control and hit multiple cars and nearly hitting a building in Gallery Place. Seven people were injured.
- On August 26, 2017, a woman was arrested after she threw a cup of urine at an X2 bus driver over the tone of the driver. After the incident, X2 drivers demand better protection on their buses due to its high crime rate and the lack of police presence on its buses. Drivers called out WMATA over the lack of protection for the X2 buses where passengers can easily get to the driver and cause disruptions to other passengers causing delays.
- On October 4, 2017, a passenger was arrested after he pulled out a knife and threatened to kill the driver of an X2 bus over a disputed fare. The driver was unharmed.
- On August 16, 2018, a white woman got into a physical altercation with passengers after a video surfaced of the woman saying the n-word on an X2 bus along 2nd and H streets. The woman was beaten up after she left the bus by passengers on the bus. Two suspects were questioned by Metro Transit Police but were not arrested. The women was sent to the hospital
- On December 10, 2018, a teenager was caught hanging from the back of an X2 bus along Benning Road. No injuries were reported.
- On January 22, 2021, an X2 bus and a car collided along the intersection of Minnesota Avenue and Benning Road. The driver of the car died while seven people were taken to the hospital.
- On July 30, 2024, a man was involved in an armed robbery and assault onboard an X2 bus along H Street NW.
- On November 9, 2024, three X2 buses were involved in a collision at Minnesota Avenue station. It was reported that one of the buses suffered a brake problem, and sideswiping another bus, sending that bus rear-ending into another bus.
- On December 11, 2024, Metro Transit Police arrested 30-year-old Gerald Evans onboard an X2 bus after he refused to pay the bus fare and was founded to be in possession of a loaded shotgun.
- On August 25, 2025, a man was shot onboard a D20 bus after getting into a confrontation with another passenger. The suspect was later arrested.
- On April 14, 2026, a man was stabbed onboard a D20 bus after getting into an verbal altercation with another passenger. The victim was taken to the hospital with non-life-threatening injuries while the suspect was arrested.

== See also ==
- H Street Limited (route D2X)
