= East River Heights (Washington, D.C.) =

Coordinates: 38°53′33.9″N 76°56′50.2″W

- Neighborhood of Washington, D.C.
- Interactive map of East River Heights
- Country: United States
- District: Washington, D.C.
- Ward: Ward 7

Government
  - Councilmember: Wendell Felder

East River Heights is a residential and mixed use neighborhood located in Ward 7 of Washington, DC. The neighborhood is considered the "downtown" area of the ward. Its borders are East Capital Street, Minnesota Ave, Benning Road up to 41st Street. It is a neighborhood of retired and working people and many children.

East River Heights is located between the Minnesota Avenue and Benning Road stations on the Washington Metro.

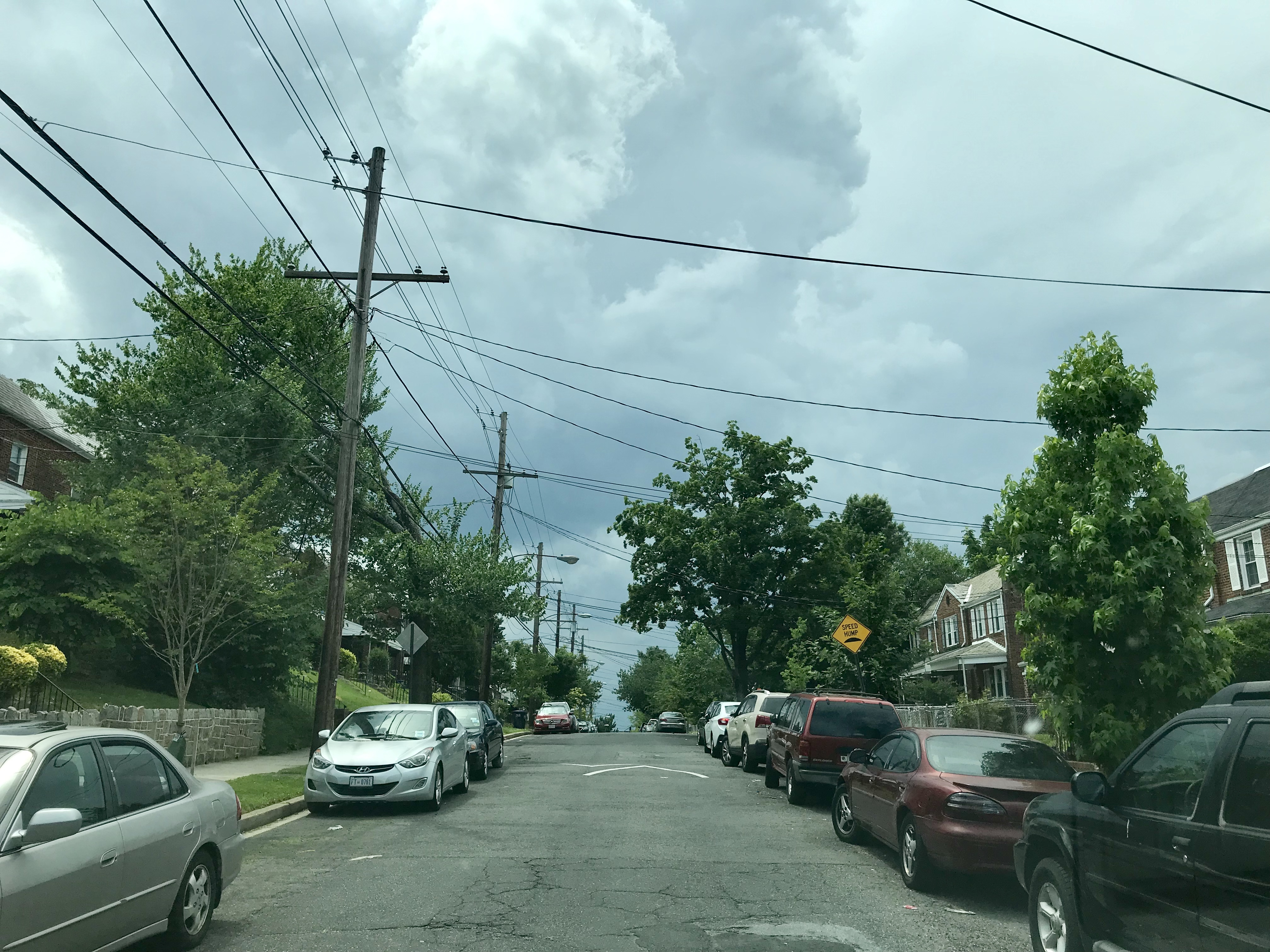
Intersection of Blaine St. and Burns St. NE, in East River Heights, May 2019
