= H Street/Benning Road Line =

DC Streetcar line

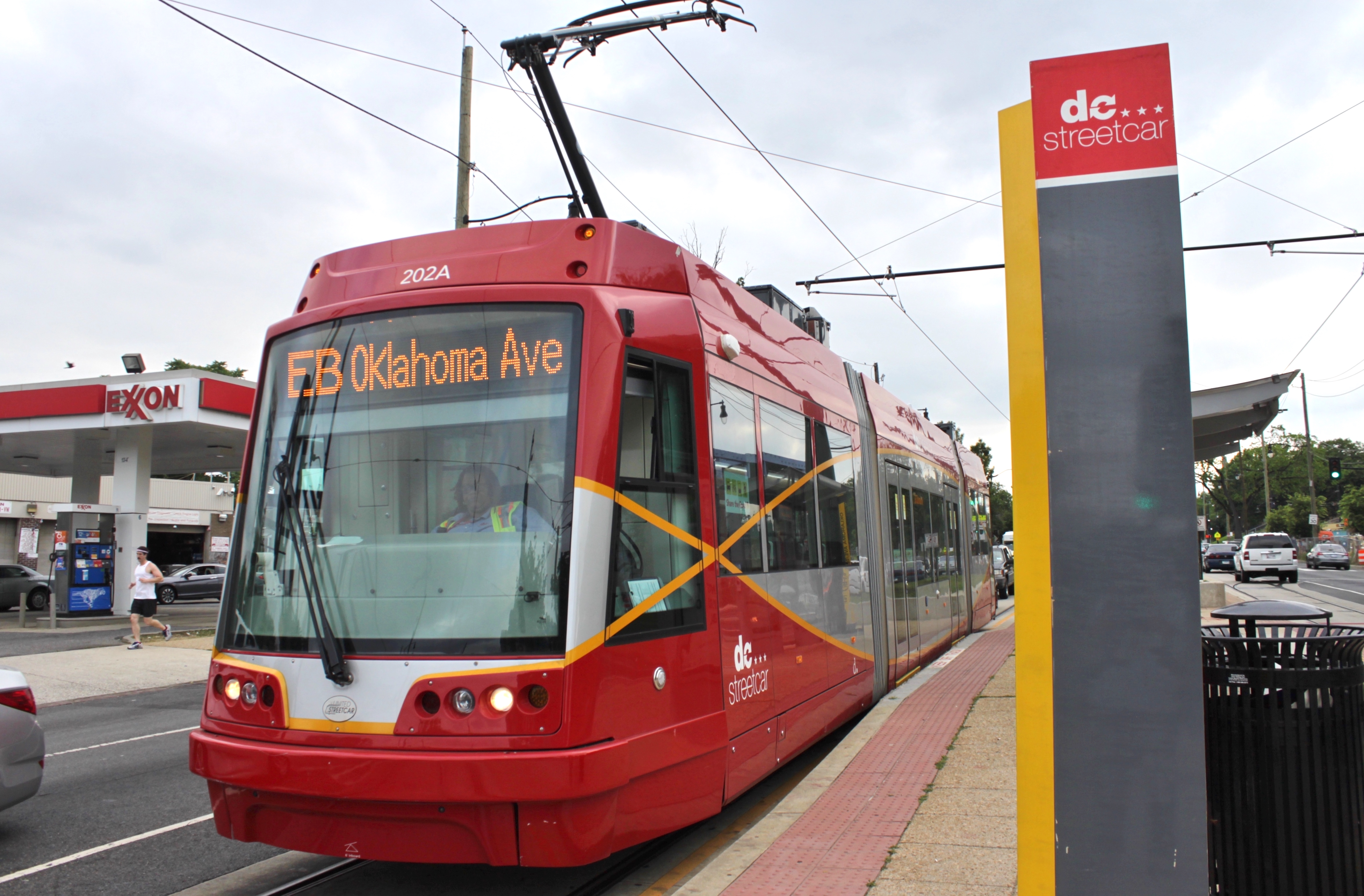
- A streetcar at the line's Oklahoma Avenue terminus in June 2016

Overview
- Owner: Government of the District of Columbia
- Area served: H Street NE and Benning Road
- Locale: Washington, D.C., U.S.
- Transit type: Streetcar
- Number of stations: 8 (5 planned)
- Daily ridership: 3,513 (May 2018)
- Annual ridership: 1,094,000 (2017) ▲20.75%

Operation
- Began operation: February 27, 2016
- Ended operation: March 31, 2026
- Operator: RATP Group
- Character: Street running and elevated
- Number of vehicles: 6
- Train length: 66.04 ft (20,130 mm)
- Headway: 12 minutes

Technical
- System length: 2.4 mi (3.9 km)
- No. of tracks: 1 and 2
- Track gauge: 4 ft 8 1/2 in (1,435 mm) standard gauge
- Minimum radius of curvature: 52 ft (16 m)
- Electrification: 750 V DC, overhead wires
- Top speed: 43 mph (70 km/h)
System map
H Street/Benning Road Line highlighted in red

The H Street/Benning Road Line was a line of DC Streetcar. It had eight stations and began operation on February 27, 2016. The 2.4-mile (3.9 km) line runs along H Street NE and Benning Road NE in Washington, D.C. In September 2016, service was increased from six days a week to seven, and with shorter 12-minute headways. It ceased operations on March 31, 2026.

== History ==
Since the dismantling of Washington, D.C.'s original streetcar lines, the corridor had been served by Metrobus's X2 route.

In 2003, Mayor Anthony A. Williams unveiled a draft Strategic Development Plan which proposed redeveloping and revitalizing six blighted areas of the city, including H Street NE and Benning Road. Among the proposals to revitalize H Street was the construction of a streetcar line to downtown D.C. in five to 10 years. The plan was formalized during the next year. Residents and business owners in the area were cautious about the plan, fearing traffic congestion and threats to pedestrian safety in an area which needed greater auto and foot traffic.

On January 20, 2006, the District of Columbia Department of Transportation announced that it would build a $13 million streetcar line on H Street NE, from Union Station to Benning Road and the Minnesota Avenue Metro station as part of its Great Streets initiative, on much of the same route established by the Columbia Railway Company in 1870. Construction was originally planned to begin in the spring of 2007 (to coincide with extensive improvements to parking and lighting and the beautification of H Street NE) and end in 2009.

=== Extension dropped; track construction ===
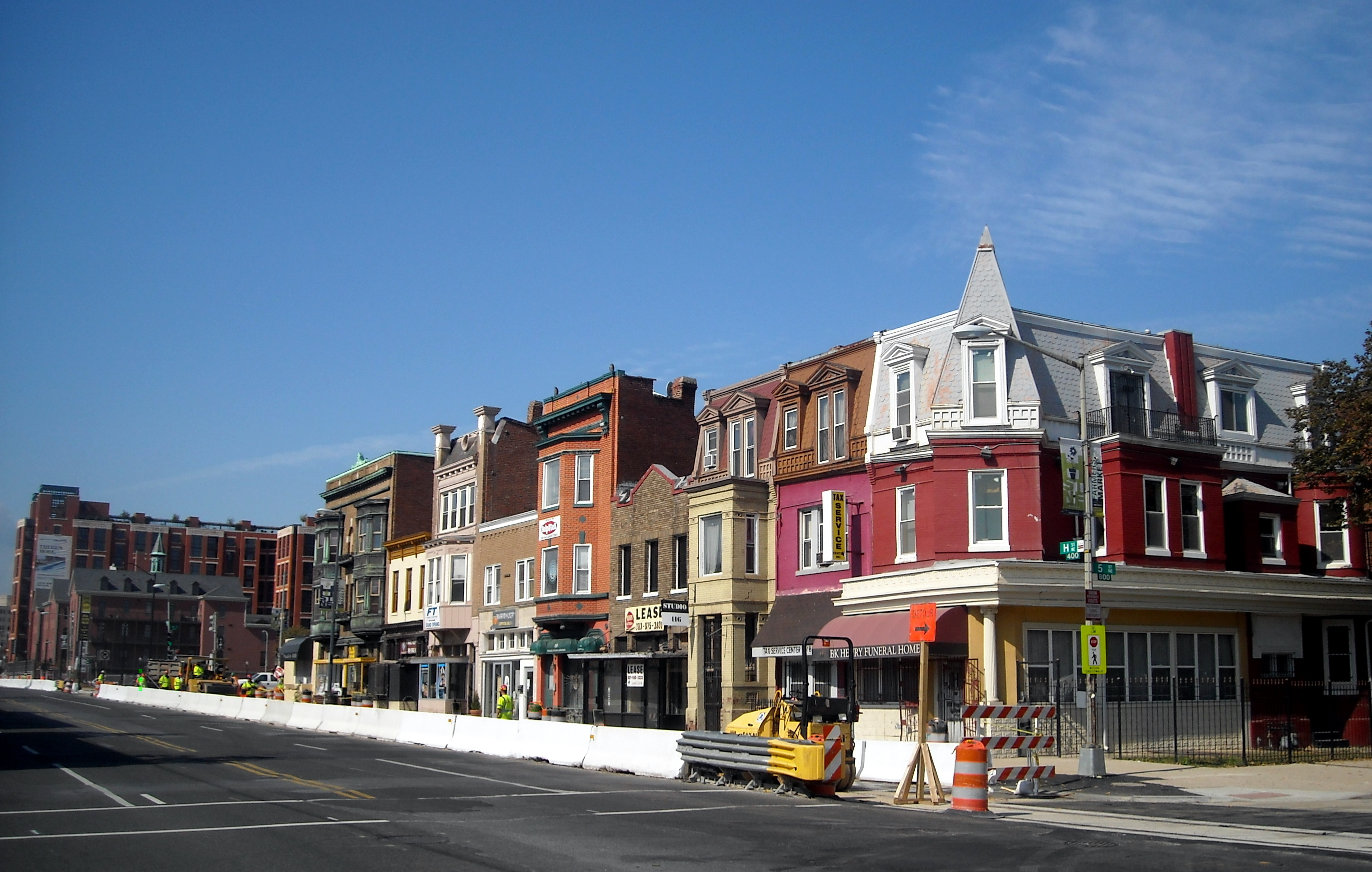
Construction of the H Street NE/Benning Road Line in October 2009

By 2008, the extension to the Minnesota Avenue Metro station had been dropped, and the H Street streetcar line was being designed to link up with a planned downtown streetcar line running along the same route as the downtown routes of the DC Circulator bus.

Streetcar tracks were installed on H Street as part of the H Street/Benning Road Great Streets project that was started in December 2007 and ended on June 30, 2011. Plans in 2009 were for the streetcar to start operation in 2011, but city engineers, had yet to determine how to get power to the cars, identify locations for the cars to turn around, or find land for a car storage facility for use at night when the line was not running.

=== Planned extension to Benning Road Metro ===
In April 2010, DDOT officials announced that they intended to build a $74 million, two-mile (3.2 km) extension of the H Street line that would link with the Benning Road Metro station. The district had applied for a $25 million federal grant to help pay for the extension. DDOT also announced a plan to link the line to Union Station, in order to connect the H Street line's eastern terminus with the Union Station Metro and Amtrak. The city said it owned a right-of-way underneath the existing Amtrak railroad tracks on which it would build the extension. In September 2017, the district issued an RFQ for engineering work related to the extension.

The city also began encouraging riders to travel along the H Street corridor to Benning Road in 2009. The "H Street Shuttle" was founded in early 2009 by the H Street Business Cooperative (a nonprofit group of retailers whose businesses line H Street) to promote travel into the business district. The shuttle ran between the Gallery Place and Minnesota Avenue Metro stations, making just four stops along the way. The city provided $130,000 in operating funds in 2009 (although the shuttle did not run for a short period in November 2009 due to funding cut-offs). The shuttle also encountered public safety problems, as fistfights sometimes broke out between rowdy youths riding the shuttle. The shuttle has also had eggs thrown at it, been shot at with BB guns, and youth have attempted to slash its tires while it made stops. Although it was intended to be a temporary measure to bring customers into the retail corridor while streetcar construction occurred, D.C. officials said they would fund the shuttle only through the end of 2010.

=== Electrification dispute ===
Local preservationist groups such as the Committee of 100 on the Federal City as well as regional planning bodies like the National Capital Planning Commission (NCPC) have opposed the current design of the streetcar system, which relies on overhead electrical wires and a pantograph to conduct power to the streetcar motor. Opponents of the design cite an 1889 federal law banning such systems in Georgetown and the historic center city (defined by the Florida Avenue NE and NW south to the Potomac and Anacostia rivers). The NCPC has also opposed use of the wires along H Street NE, the 11th Street bridges, and in Anacostia. These groups have proposed a design change that would rely on wireless technologies, such as battery-powered vehicles which rely on conduit current collection (in which a metal arm or "plow" is inserted into a channel in the street and draws power from cables under the roadway). But District of Columbia officials say the current overhead lines are not visually obtrusive, and that conduit collection systems are costly and break down easily in cities with wet climates.

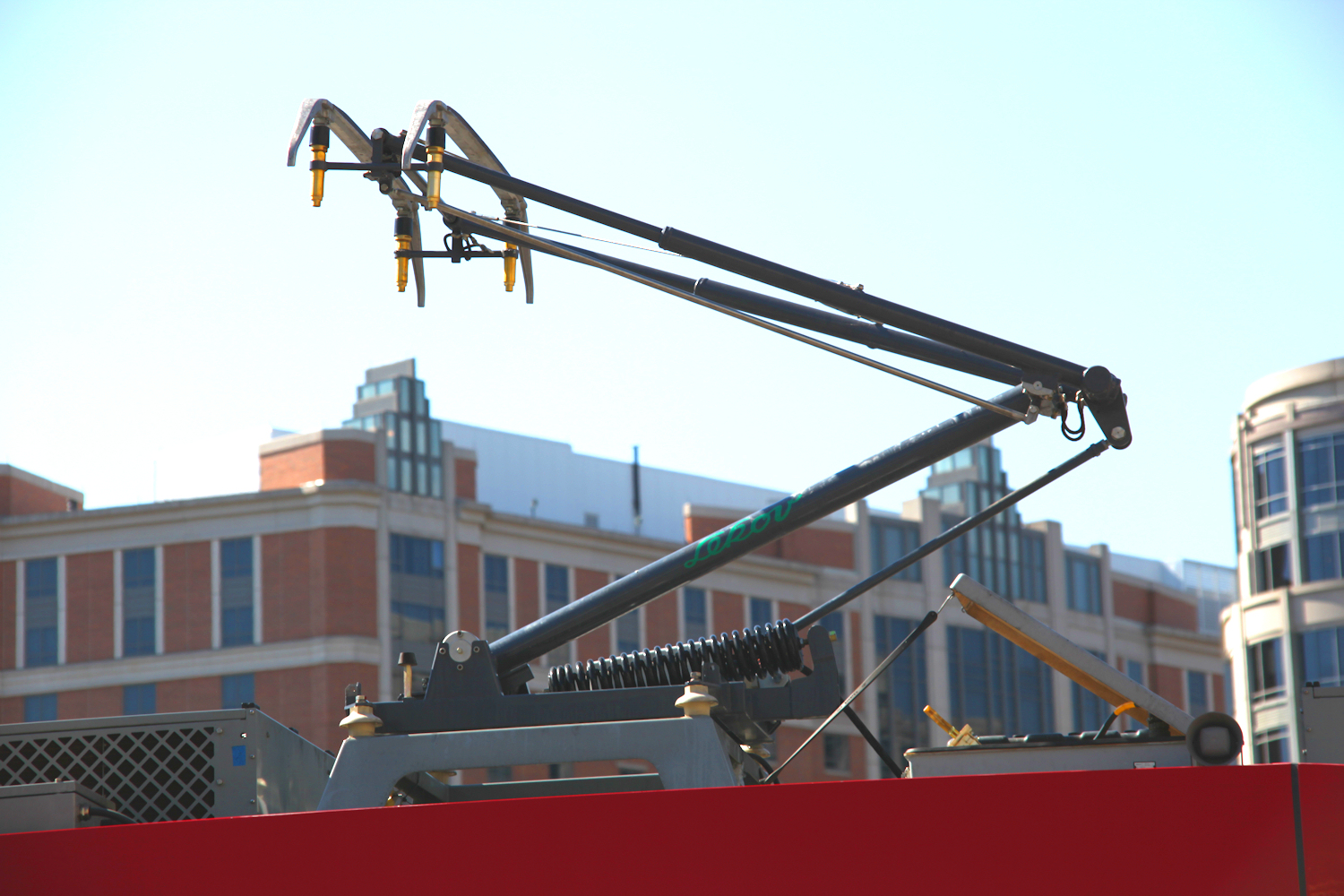
A pantograph on a DC Streetcar during a public display in 2010

City transportation planning officials have also proposed building a system that would run on wires outside the historic core but switch to a hybrid battery/conduit system inside the area. On May 31, 2010, 12 of the council's 13 members co-sponsored a bill to exempt the H Street Line from the 1888 and 1889 laws that banned overhead electrification in the city's historic core. The legislation required that the mayor's office develop a citywide plan by 2014 to determine where additional overhead electrification could be permitted. The Committee of 100 supported the planning requirement, and the legislation passed the council on June 29, 2010.

But in late June 2010, the chair of the National Capital Planning Commission, L. Preston Bryant Jr., sent a letter to the Federal Transit Administration demanding that $25 million in federal money intended for the streetcar project be withheld until the NCPC and city reached agreement regarding the overhead electrification issue. The NCPC said they had legal advice which indicated that only Congress had the power to rescind the 1888 and 1889 laws. City council members, who had been negotiating with the NCPC, said the NCPC's action was a sign of bad faith in the talks. DDOT Director Gabe Klein said the NCPC was "blackmailing" city leaders, and that the NCPC was overstepping its boundary as a purely advisory body. Klein asked Bryant to rescind his letter, arguing that Bryant had purposefully misstated the city's plans for overhead electrification (claiming it would install overhead wires on the National Mall and near Congress) and asserting that the H Street Line was not covered by the 1888 and 1889 laws. Klein also cited two previous legal opinions which concluded the city had the power to rescind the 1800s legislation. On July 13, 2010, the D.C. Council passed legislation to allow the overhead wires along Benning Road and H Street NE. The legislation specifically banned the wires around the National Mall and along Pennsylvania Avenue between Capitol Hill and the White House, and established a process for seeking public and other input on whether wires should be used elsewhere in the city.

=== Funding issue, plans revised ===
Funding for the DC Streetcar system became an issue in 2010. D.C. Mayor Adrian Fenty proposed spending $60 million to $70 million in his fiscal 2011 budget to complete the H Street Line and purchase six trams, with a goal of activating the line in the spring of 2012. Funding for other lines would be withheld until the city was assured that the H Street Line was a success. Fenty also released the results of a study commissioned by the Downtown DC Business Improvement District (BID) and researched by the Brookings Institution, Robert Charles Lesser & Co. research firm, and Reconnecting America (a non-profit public transit advocacy group) which found that the DC Streetcar system could increase the value of businesses along the H Street Line by $1.1 billion over 20 years.

Fenty proposed levying a $375 million tax on businesses on the H Street Line to help pay for the streetcar system. But on May 25, 2010, the D.C. City Council voted to delete $49 million in proposed streetcar funding in order to help close a $550 million budget deficit. DC Streetcar advocates accused Sarah Campbell, capital budget director for the City Council, for deleting the funds, pointing out that Campbell is also a member of the Committee of 100 on the Federal City (which opposed the streetcar system as currently planned). DDOT Director Gabe Klein accused the Council of killing the program. Campbell denied both allegations. The Washington Post reported that the budget battle may have been sparked by Council Chair Vincent C. Gray, who was likely to challenge Fenty for the Democratic nomination for mayor in September 2010. The following day, after hundreds of angry phone calls from residents, the Council restored the funds by agreeing to borrow the money.

On October 23, 2010, D.C. transportation officials published a revised plan for the DC Streetcar system. The new plan envisioned opening the H Street/Benning Road and Anacostia lines in March or April 2012. It also significantly scaled back the Anacostia Line, truncating the northern end of the line at the Anacostia Metro station. The plan estimated the cost of constructing the two lines at $194 million, with operating costs at about $8 million per year. DDOT officials said they believed 6,350 riders per day would pay the $1 fare in the system's first year, with ridership tripling to 23,450 riders a day in 2015. The cars would be equipped to accept SmarTrip cards but not cash, and officials said anyone transferring from Metro to the DC Streetcar system using a SmarTrip card would ride for free. The streetcars were expected to operate every 10 to 15 minutes, seven days a week, during the same hours Metro's rail system was in operation.

Funding for completion of the two lines was still unclear, however. DDOT had applied for a $110 million federal grant, but had already lost a competition for an $18 million grant. City planners said they continued to look at tapping into a $180 million fund designed to service Metro's debt, enacting BID or zoning taxes in areas affected by the streetcar system, or creating public-private partnerships that would tap into private money for construction in exchange for tax breaks or concessions by the city. The overhead electrical wire issue also remained unresolved in the plan (although battery-operated cars were mentioned). Finally, the plan laid out a process for selecting a third party to operate the system (which may or may not be Metro). Funding issues continued to raise concern in other ways, too. The rising cost of the project became an issue in the reelection bid of D.C. City Council member Tommy Wells, whose ward encompasses H Street. The City Council held a hearing on the newly unveiled plan on November 16. Five days later, angry business owners along H Street demanded a tax refund and a moratorium on tax sales during a second council hearing. Business owners said construction of the streetcar line had caused sales to drop by as much as 70 percent, and City Council member Jim Graham introduced legislation establishing a $7 million fund to help businesses impacted by the construction.

=== Proposed 2013 introduction ===
On August 22, 2011, DDOT announced the first streetcars would roll on the H Street line in the summer of 2013.

In late August 2011, DDOT announced the H Street Line would begin operation in the summer of 2013. City officials said all platform stops had been constructed along the route, but overhead electricity lines, turnarounds at each end of the line, a streetcar overnight holding facility ("car barn"), maintenance facility, and three power substations remained to be built. The holding and maintenance facility would likely be constructed at the eastern end of the line, officials said, and might also contain training facilities in streetcar operation for local high school students. DDOT said that one of the major remaining issues confronting the line was the completion of the western terminus at Union Station. Originally, DDOT had wanted to cut through the footing of the bridge carrying H Street over the Amtrak rail lines, allowing streetcars to pass under the railroad tracks and access a streetcar platform on Union Station's west side. However, Amtrak declined to allow DDOT permission to use this space, as the railroad intended to access it for high-speed rail in the future. DDOT said it was considering three new options: 1) Running streetcars over the bridge; 2) Adding about five blocks of additional streetcar track to allow streetcar riders to get off at the NoMa–Gallaudet U Metro station; and 3) Asking Amtrak for turnaround space under the existing Amtrak railroad track. DDOT said four companies had bid to design and construct these remaining pieces of the H Line, and another was being sought to operate the line. DDOT officials also said they were considering extending the H Street Line to the Benning Road Metro station as well as down K Street NW to Washington Circle.

In January 2012, the D.C. Office of Planning released a report which asserted that the streetcar system had the potential to create 7,700 new jobs and added as much as $8 billion in new development over a 10-year period. The system could also increase office building property values by $5.8 billion, and residential property values by $1.6 billion, exceeding by 600 to 1,000 percent the cost of building the system. The study also said that 4,000 to 12,000 households would move back into the District of Columbia from the suburbs, and the number of people living on or near a streetcar line would triple. The report "conservatively" projected that up to $291 million in annual tax revenues would be generated by the fully completed streetcar system. Chris Leinberger of the Brookings Institution told The Washington Post that the streetcar system had the potential to finally move development out of the northwest quadrant of the city into the underdeveloped northeast and southeast. But not everything about streetcars was positive. The report also said streetcars would also be likely to worsen traffic congestion on Benning Road SE, Columbia Road NW, Florida Avenue NW and Florida Avenue NE, Georgia Avenue NW, and K Street NW, and might make it "prohibitively expensive" for small businesses to exist along the lines.

=== New task force ===
Concerned that the streetcar project was not well-managed and losing public support, D.C. Council member Mary Cheh introduced legislation to create a task force that would study whether the streetcar project should be removed from DDOT's jurisdiction and placed under a separate streetcar authority.

=== Service changes ===
In December 2011, the city announced that the H Street/Benning Road line would be routed over the H Street Bridge (colloquially known as the "Hopscotch Bridge" because of modern art on the bridge which depicts children playing hopscotch). Planners said that the trolley would still connect with Union Station, but did not say how.

=== Controversy ===
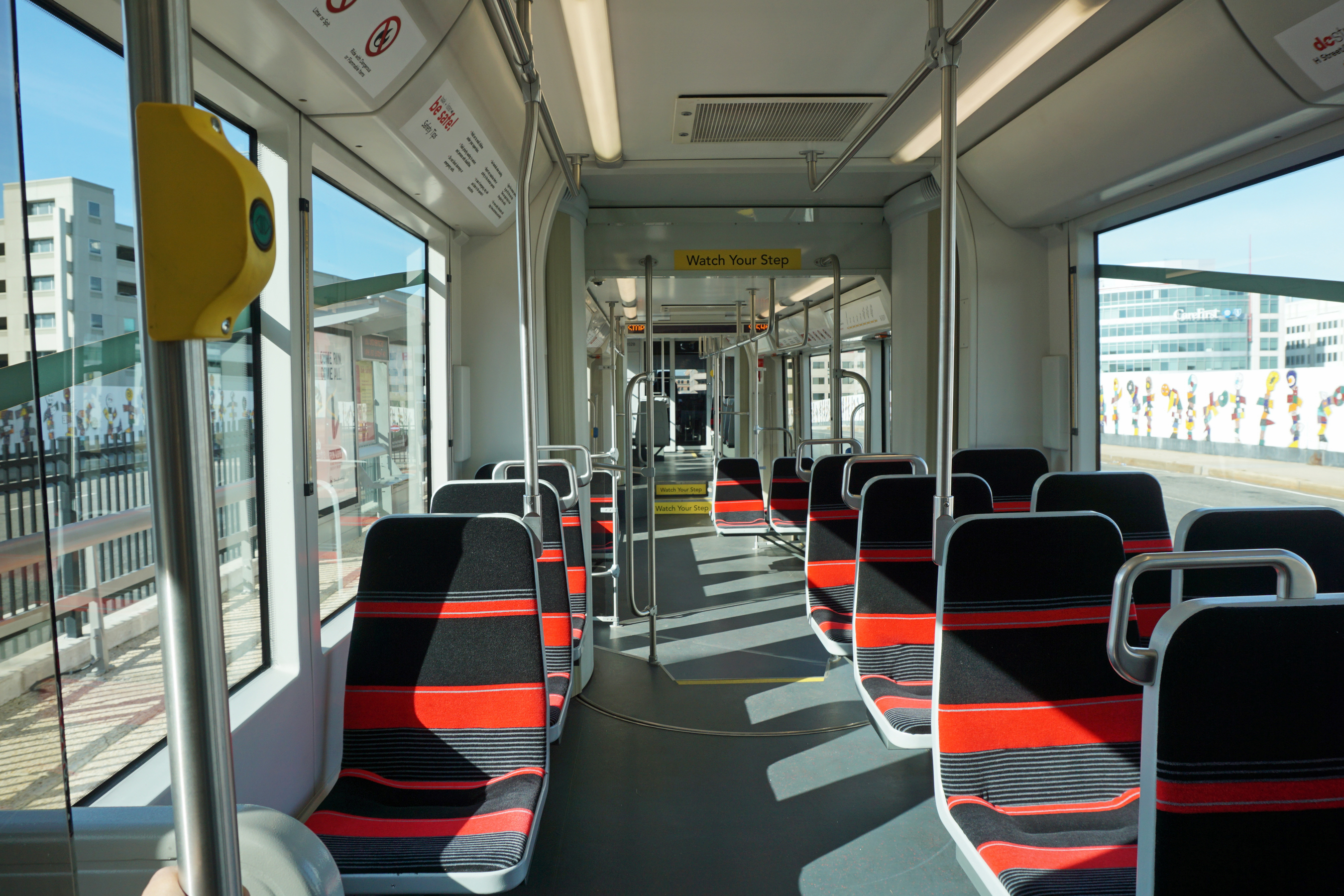
Interior of a streetcar making a test or training run on DC Streetcar's H Street NE line

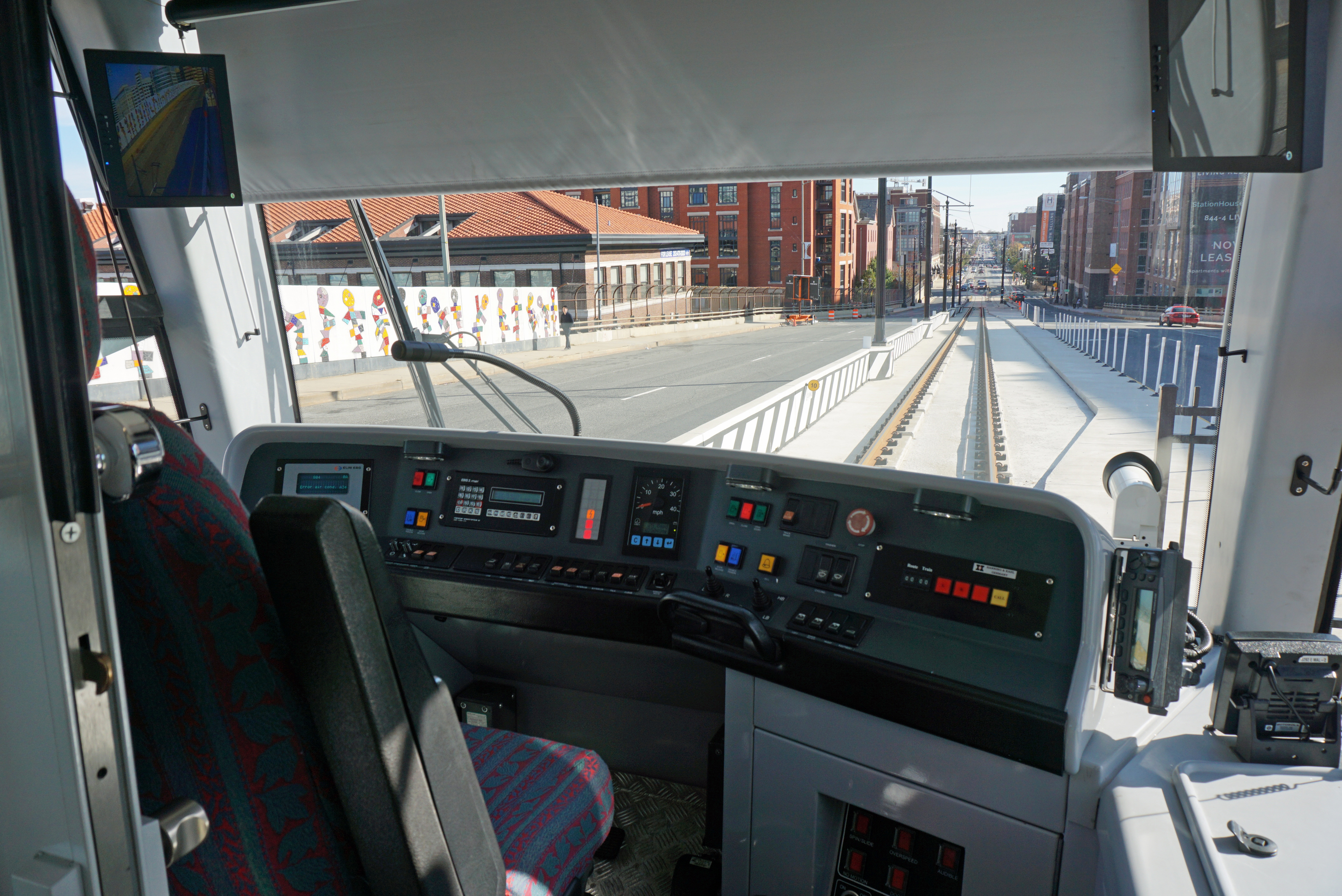
Control panel of a streetcar running on DC Streetcar's H Street NE line

Several controversies arose over the H Street/Benning Road line in early 2012. According to United Streetcar, a streetcar manufacturing company based in Oregon, the city awarded United Streetcar $8.7 million in contracts to build trolley cars for the H Street/Benning Road line. Contracts were awarded in June 2011 and again in September 2011. On December 16, 2011, D.C. City Councilwoman Mary Cheh filed a "disapproval resolution" with the mayor's office, placing a 40-day hold on the contract after questions arose as to whether the contract called for the construction of two trolley cars (as the city claimed) or three (as Cheh believed). On December 21, 2011, Inekon Group filed a protest of the award with the D.C. Contract Appeals Board, claiming that cost/price trade-off analysis used by the city was inappropriate. Streetcar proponents worried that the protest could delay the contract by up to 2.5 years, but DDOT moved much more quickly and canceled the contracts in early January 2012 after a formal internal review. In February, DDOT began the contract solicitation process anew. Due to the contract controversy, DDOT said it might begin running the H Street/Benning Road line with just three streetcars instead of five. D.C. City Council member Tommy Wells pressed DDOT to wait until it could run five trolley cars, arguing that with just three cars the streetcar system would not be convenient enough for passengers. Council member Mary Cheh, chair of the council's transportation committee, said the DDOT's management of the streetcar project had lost the confidence of the public and that she would seek legislation establishing an independent authority to run the system. A new contract for vehicles was awarded in April, again to United Streetcar.

At about the same time, DDOT announced a plan to build a $13 million, 14,000-square-foot (1,300 m^{2}) trolley car barn, operations base, and maintenance facility on the grounds of Spingarn High School (which is near the eastern terminus of the line). The facility would house only a few cars at first, but would be able to accommodate 12 cars. Residents of the Kingman Park neighborhood opposed the facility on the grounds that it would be noisy, near a public school, cause traffic congestion, and cause a reduction in property values. They demanded that DDOT seek approval from the local Advisory Neighborhood Commission (ANC), but DDOT officials said that the site did not require ANC or other legislative approval.

=== Budget proposal, contract awarded, further controversy ===
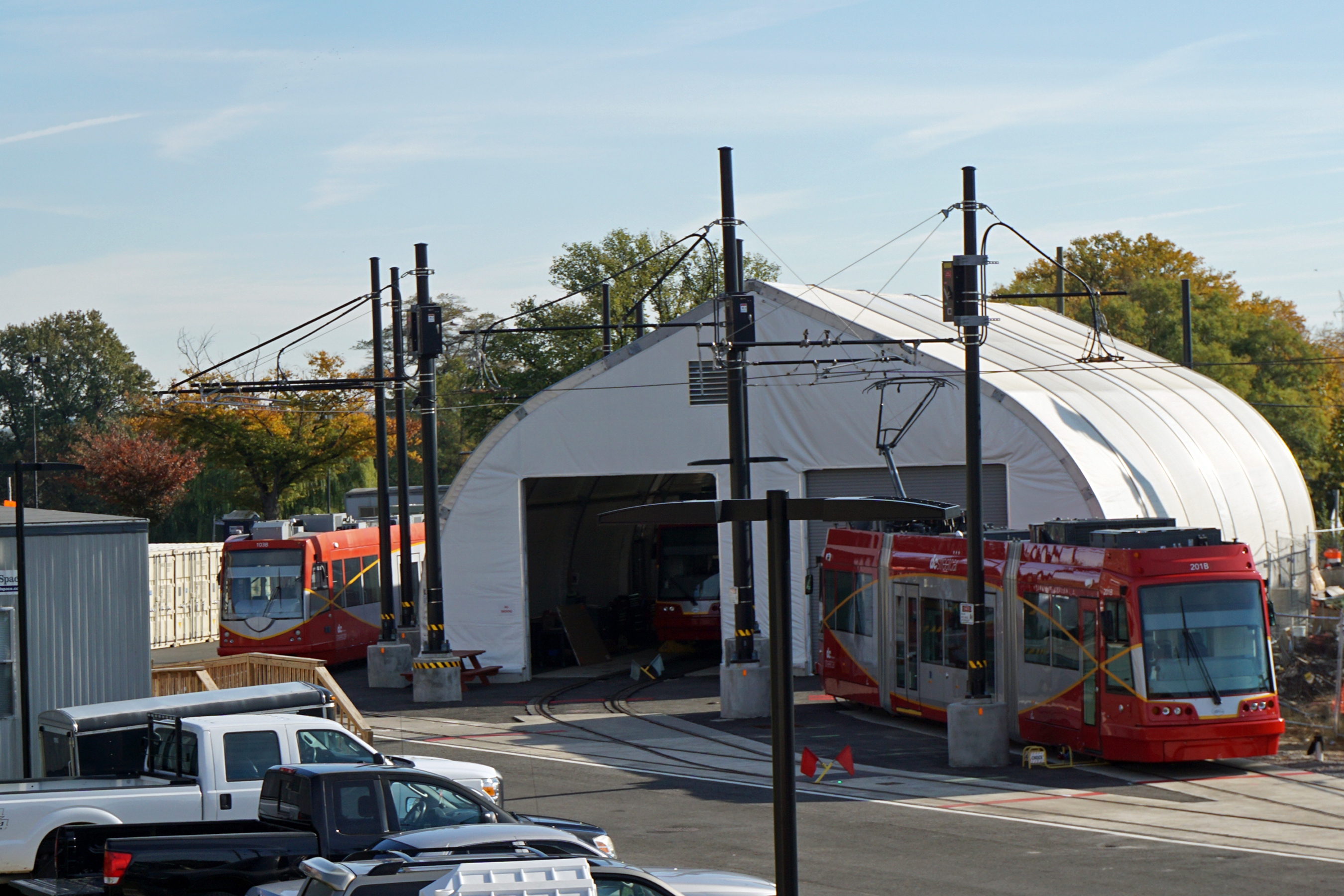
DC Streetcar yard and the temporary storage facility (car barn) at the corner of Benning Road and 26th Street NE

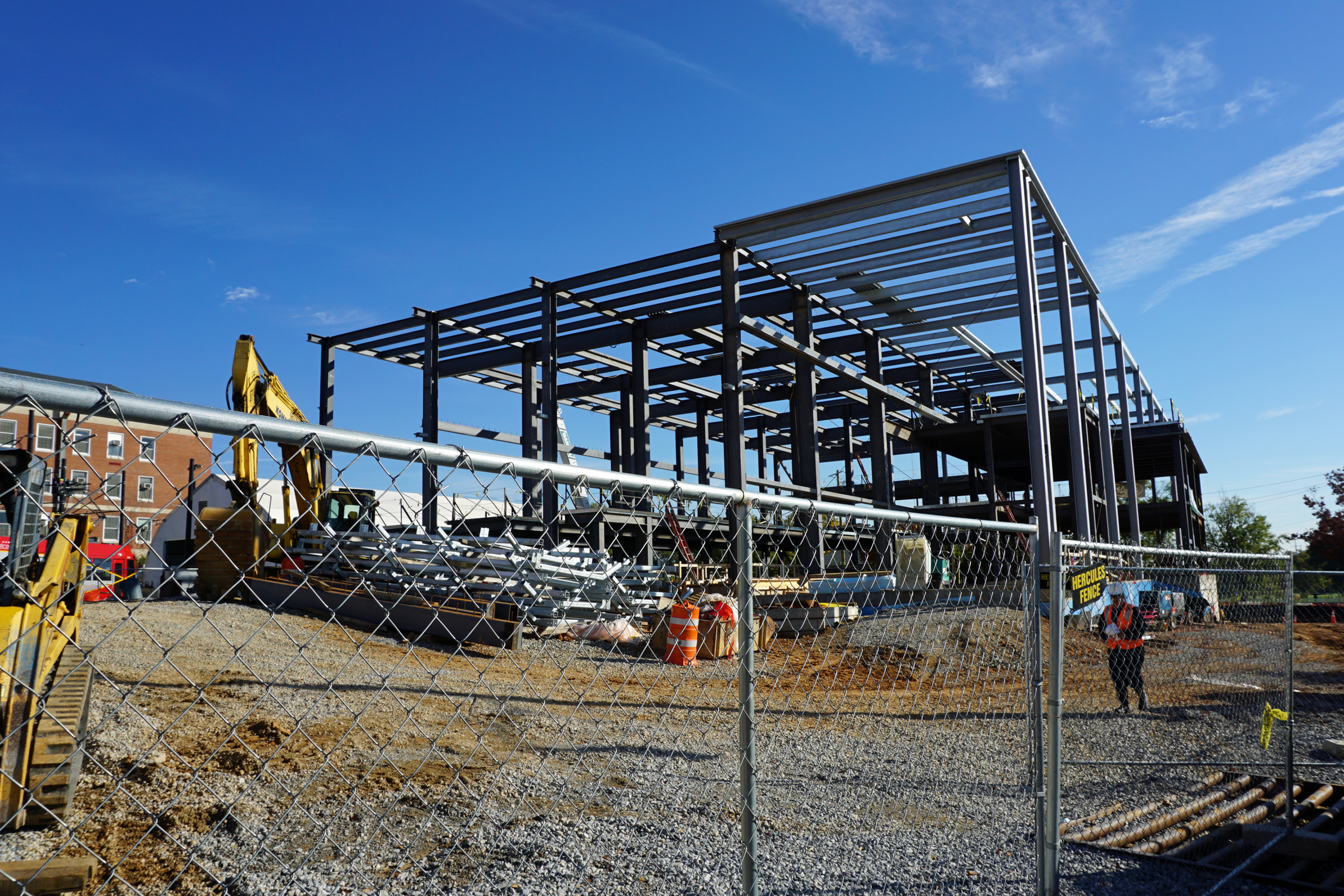
Construction site of the DC Streetcar permanent Car Barn Training Center (CBTC II) at the corner of Benning Road and 26th Street NE

In March 2012, D.C. Mayor Vincent Gray proposed a six-year, $237 million capital expenditure budget that would continue to expand the DC Streetcar system. But just a few days later, District officials admitted that it would cost $64.5 million to operate the first two lines during their first five years of operation — but the city only had revenues to pay for about 58 percent of those costs. Nonetheless, the city reaffirmed its commitment to opening the H Street line in 2013, and announced it had signed a contract with Oregon Iron Works subsidiary United Streetcar to buy two more streetcars for $8.7 million. Additional controversy over the future of the streetcar system occurred in June 2012 when the Cato Institute (an American libertarian think tank) issued a study denouncing government-built streetcar systems for being too costly, inefficient, and unable to generate economic revitalization.

In mid-June 2012, the city signed a $50 million contract with Dean Facchina LLC (a joint venture between M.C. Dean, Inc. and Facchina Construction Company) to design and construct the car barn, power system, and turnarounds for the H Street line. Mayor Vincent Gray said the contract was a sign that the city was going to adhere to a summer 2013 opening. But a few days later, D.C. Council member Marion Barry filed paperwork that placed a 45-day "hold" on the automatic council approval of the contract. Barry argued that too much money was being spent on a system that served too few people. Barry withdrew his objection just a few days later after Gray assured him that D.C. residents would be hired for construction jobs on the project.

Financing the system continued to generate controversy in June 2012. Mayor Gray opened a city office in Shanghai to promote Chinese trade with and investment in the District of Columbia. In his talks with Chinese trade officials, he discussed having the Exim Bank of China fund the system's construction. Gray said that Chinese officials expressed surprise that it would take the city 20 years to build out the entire system, and Chinese officials suggested they could fund all or part of the $1.5 billion streetcar project in exchange for all or a portion of the fares generated by it. After the meeting, Gray told the media that an independent financing authority might be needed to finance the streetcar system. Even as Gray was suggesting that the city government continue to build and run the DC Streetcar system, DDOT officials released a "request for information" (RFI) to construction and operations contractors regarding the proposed construction schedule, financing, and governance of the project. The RFI noted that, if the city privatized the entire streetcar project, it would seek a 30-year contract and give the private entity a free hand in designing, financing, and constructing the streetcar system (although the city would retain final say over fares).

D.C. Council member Tommy Wells said he opposed any privatization effort. He argued a private company would seek to raise fares, reduce the number of routes built, and provide low-quality service to gain the highest profit. Wells also expressed his belief no private company would want to serve Ward 8, where the city's poorest but most mass transit-dependent population lives. DDOT countered by saying that although building the system would cost $1.2 billion (which included purchasing 50 streetcars), it would only cost $65 million a year to operate (compared to DC Circulator buses, which need $70 million a year to operate). DDOT also said its RFI was intended to see if there was a market for building and operating its streetcar system, and not a request for proposals.

As the city's RFI was being considered, DDOT announced it had signed a five-year, $4 million contract with RATP Dev McDonald Transit Associates (RDMT), a subsidiary of RATP Group, to operate the H Street/Benning Road Line. The contract also assigned training and the operation of maintenance facilities to RDMT.

=== Future in jeopardy ===
In September 2012, the future of the H Street line was thrown into question. DDOT had long planned to build its streetcar barn on the grounds of Spingarn High School. But the Kingman Park Civic Association filed an application with the D.C. Historic Preservation Review Board to have Spingarn High School declared a city landmark. That would force DDOT to find a new location for the car barn. On October 8, 2012, DDOT director Terry Bellamy told the D.C. Council that the civic association's actions would push the opening of the H Street line into early 2014, even if landmark status was not awarded to the high school. Bellamy expressed optimism, however, that the H Street line would still open, and said that DDOT was already planning to extend it to Minnesota Avenue. He also said the city was still working on plans to open an Anacostia line in Ward 8. D.C. Council members, however, expressed dismay at DDOT's apparent lack of a strategic plan for the streetcar system. They also voiced scepticism that DDOT was planning ahead and concern that more problems (similar to the Spingarn High School issue) would continue to plague the system because of poor planning.

=== Testing and fares ===
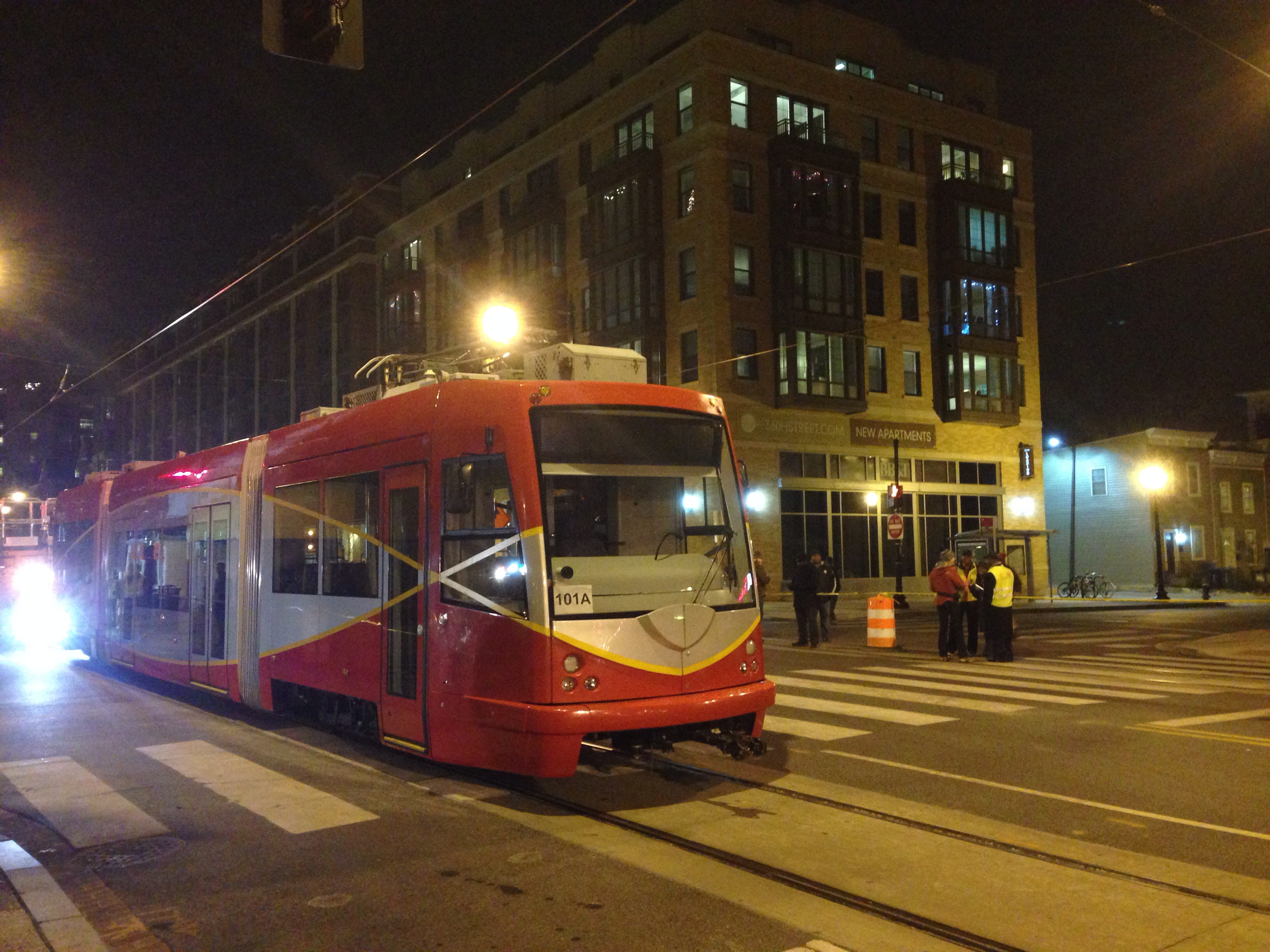
Inekon-built car 101 being towed along H Street on the night of December 13, 2013, during the first tests to the check track and platform clearances with a streetcar

In April 2014, DDOT estimated that the H Street Line would open in the fall of 2014. A temporary car barn at the former Spingarn High School was scheduled for completion in July. Testing of the system would take several weeks, and then the system would need to be certified for operation by the Federal Transit Administration (FTA), which would take another 60 to 80 days. DDOT also said it needed to take delivery of a sixth streetcar, likely in June, before any testing could begin.

DDOT also began the process of setting the system's fare in the spring of 2014. Mayor Gray proposed a $1 fare, which would require a $4.65 million subsidy to meet the H Street Line's anticipated yearly operating cost of $5.1 million. On April 29, however, DDOT Director Terry Bellamy suggested the fare might be as high as $1.50 for SmarTrip farecard users and $2 for cash users (the same fare structure proposed for the DC Circulator bus system).

With a decision on the fare structure still months off, Council Member Marion Barry threatened to cancel all funding for all planned DC Streetcar lines. Barry argued that the rider subsidy was too high and that the $800 million planned for construction of the remaining lines could be better used for road maintenance and school construction.

=== Completion ===
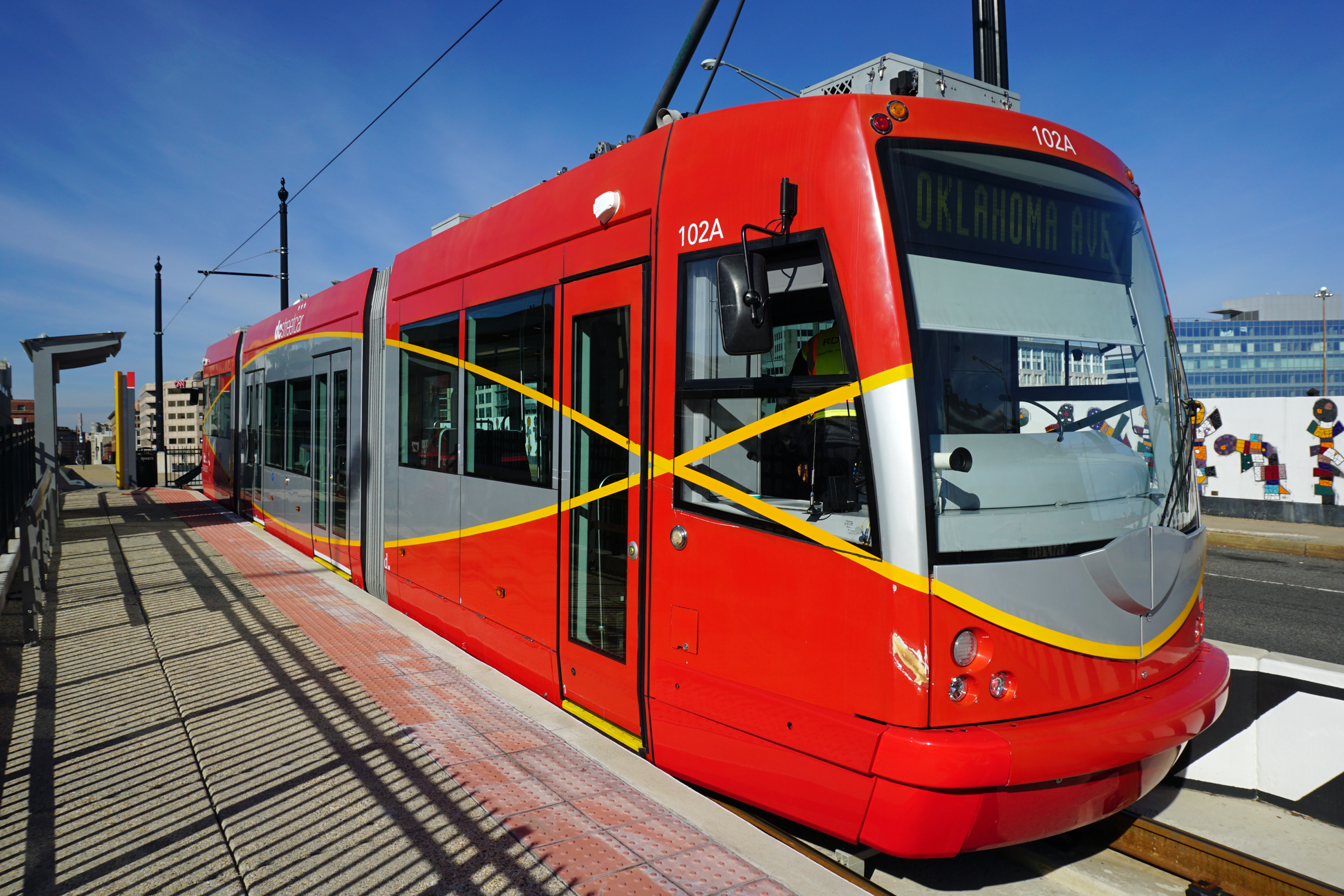
A streetcar running on H Street NE during the testing phase in October 2015

On December 17, 2012, DC Streetcar officials said only 20 percent of the H Street line remained to be completed, and that they anticipated streetcars to be rolling in October 2013.

On December 13, 2013, the first streetcar was placed on the tracks on the H Street line.

As of April 2014, the H Street Line's western terminus was still planned for the Hopscotch Bridge (a bridge which connects H Street NE to North Capitol Street).

Testing on the H Street-Benning Road Line began in August 2014, with a planned opening date for the line in late 2014 (or possibly early 2015 if there are delays in the testing process).

After more delays, the line had been tentatively projected to open in January 2015, but on January 16 the DDOT's director Leif Dormsjo announced that the department would no longer issue any estimates for an opening date and that he intended to reorganize the project's management team. On July 9, 2015, in a Washington Post article detailing problems with the heaters for the rails, Dormsjo indicated it would be "months" before the trolley line opened.

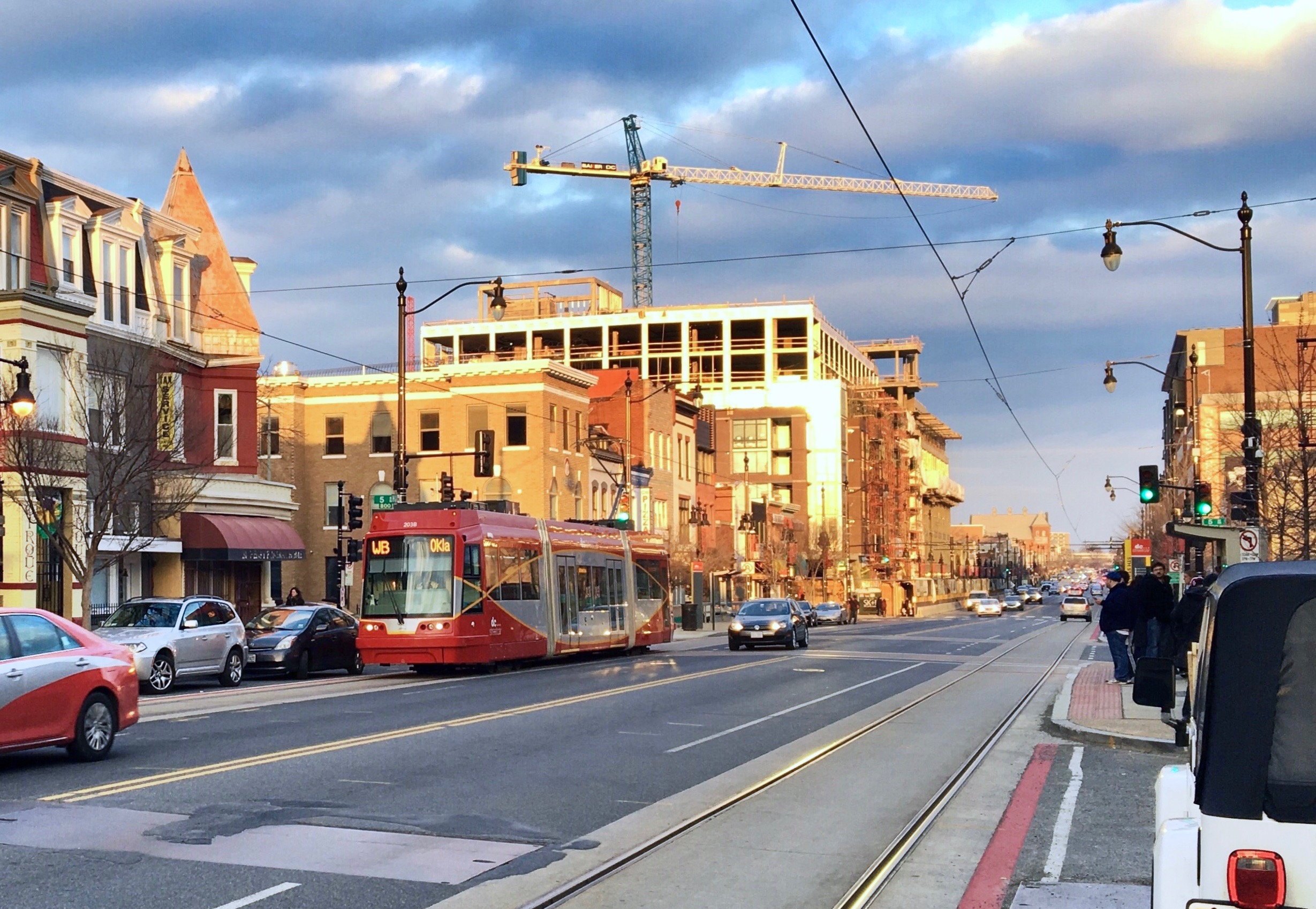
A streetcar in service on H Street in March 2016

On February 21, 2015, a brief flash fire was ignited on the top of a streetcar in simulated service. In early March 2015, DDOT suggested that the project may be scrapped entirely, if an outside review being conducted by the American Public Transportation Association found "fatal flaws", but the findings, released on March 16, found no "fatal flaws" in the project.

Dan Malouff, a writer for the Greater Greater Washington website, reported on July 10, 2015, that a review prepared for the DDOT had identified 33 causes for continued delay in rolling out fare service. He said that none of the reported causes for delay were considered "fatal", but the DDOT had not yet responded to the report with a prediction as to when all the problems would be attended to.

The DC Streetcar's H Street/Benning line began public service operations on February 27, 2016.

=== Closure ===
Ten years after beginning public service operations, the H Street/Benning line closed. No official reason was provided. The route is planned to be used by WMATA's Gold line.

== Station listing ==
The entire line was in Washington, D.C., and served 8 stops:

Station	Image	Coordinates	Platform type
Union Station		38.900188°N 77.005265°W	Side
3rd Street		38.900269°N 77.001697°W	Side
5th Street		38.900209°N 76.999500°W	Side
8th Street		38.900206°N 76.994996°W	Side
13th Street		38.900128°N 76.988571°W	Side
15th Street		38.900054°N 76.983004°W	Island
19th Street		38.898835°N 76.9761311°W	Island
Oklahoma Avenue		38.8977652°N 76.9699093°W	Island

The Benning Road extension would have added 5 more stations:

- Kingman Island
- 34th Street
- 39th Street
- 42nd Street
- Benning Road
