= Bookmans =

Bookmans Entertainment Exchange
- Company type: Private
- Industry: Bookstore and Entertainment
- Founded: 1976
- Headquarters: Tucson, Arizona
- Number of locations: 5
- Key people: Bob Oldfather (Founder and President)
- Products: Used books Magazines; CDs; DVDs; Video games Electronics; Musical instruments
- Website: www.bookmans.com

Bookmans, officially known as Bookmans Entertainment Exchange, is an American bookseller and the largest used book retailer based in Arizona. It was founded in 1976 by Bob Oldfather. Besides books, the store also sells magazines, CDs, DVDs, electronics, video games, and musical instruments. Some stores have free access to Wi-Fi Internet. Bookmans stores are located in Tucson, Mesa, Phoenix and Flagstaff. The Flagstaff store includes a cafe, that is popular with locals, tourists, and students from Northern Arizona University.

Bookmans is a member of the American Booksellers Association and the American Booksellers Foundation for Free Expression. The company is known for its annual reading competition open to Arizona elementary schools, called The Bookmans’ Reading Challenge. The company sponsors, among other things, local music and art venues like The Loft Cinema, public and festival events like the HoCo Record Festival at the Hotel Congress, and other local organizations and communities throughout Arizona.

== Unionization ==
Employees unionized with UFCW Local 99 in September 2024, went on strike for a day in May 2025, and signed a collective bargaining agreement with management in March 2026.
