= 19th Street =

19th Street may refer to:

- 19th Street (Manhattan), in New York City, New York
  - 19th Street Gang, a predominantly Irish street gang in New York City
- 19th Street (Washington, D.C.)
- 19th Street Bridge, a truss bridge in Denver, Colorado

== Other uses ==
- 19th Street LBC Compilation, a compilation album of Long Beach based rappers

== See also ==
- 19th Street station
- 19th Avenue
