= 19th Street station =

19th Street station may refer to:

- 19th Street station (DC Streetcar), a former streetcar stop in Washington, D.C.
- 19th Street station (H&M), a former subway station in Manhattan, New York
- 19th Street station (IRT Second Avenue Line), a former elevated station in Manhattan, New York
- 19th Street station (SEPTA), an underground trolley station station in Philadelphia, Pennsylvania
- 19th Street Oakland station, a rapid transit station in Oakland, California
- Union Station/South 19th Street station, a light rail station in Tacoma, Washington

== See also ==
- 19th Street
- 19th Avenue station
