= The Loft Cinema =

Movie theater in Tucson, Arizona

Coordinates: 32.236381°N 110.923558°W

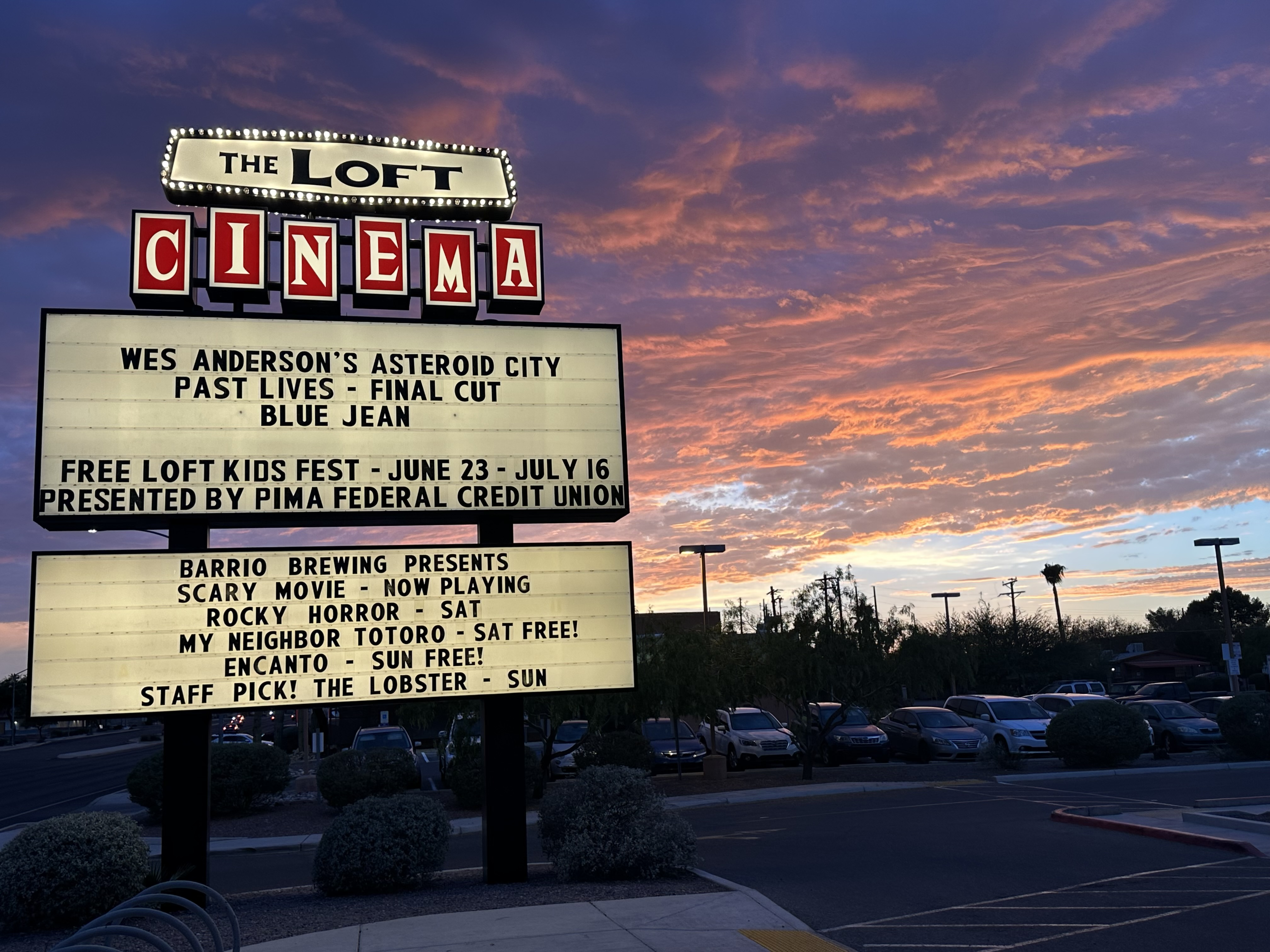
The Loft Cinema marquee at sunset in Tucson, AZ

The Loft Cinema is a nonprofit art house cinema located in Tucson, Arizona.

== History ==
The theatre, originally named The Loft, opened as an art house in 1965 at the northeast corner of East Sixth Street and North Fremont Avenue. Designed by architect Howard Peck, and built in 1938, the space first functioned as a meeting place for LDS student members and then was converted into a performance space for Playbox Community Theatre in the late 1950s. In 1965, The Loft took over the space, showing art films for 4 years before switching to adult films in 1969. New management in 1972 renamed the space The New Loft Cinema, and low-budget independent and foreign films were screened. The New Loft moved to its current location at 3233 East Speedway Boulevard in 1992, when the University of Arizona purchased the building. In 2002, then owner, Joe Esposito, sold The New Loft Cinema to the newly formed non-profit, The Tucson Cinema Foundation (later renamed Loft Cinema, Inc.).

The Loft Cinema screens first-run independent American and foreign films and documentaries, as well as classic art films and special events. The Loft Cinema launched the Campaign for The Loft Cinema in 2024, a major renovation and expansion project designed to enhance accessibility, and improve the movie-going experience. The Loft Cinema has undergone significant renovations that expanded and modernized the facility. The theater now operates five screens with seating capacities ranging from approximately 72 to 370 seats, replacing the earlier configuration of three screens. Renovations unveiled in August 2025 included updates to the lobby, restrooms, and concession areas. Additional construction has continued as the theater remains open to the public. Accessibility improvements were also implemented during this period: a wheelchair ramp was completed and an elevator providing multi-level access became operational in February 2026.. In May 2025, the workers of the Loft Cinema announced the formation of a new labor union with IATSE Local 415.

In 2025 The Loft Cinema faced public protest for failing to listen to the community members.

== Events ==
The Loft Cinema hosts a monthly short film contest, First Friday Shorts, co-hosted by comedian and KXCI DJ Brigitte Thum and comedian Mike Sterner, a former writer for Bill Maher’s Politically Incorrect. The Rocky Horror Picture Show has been continuously run with a revolving shadow cast since 1978. Ongoing events include weekly screenings of cult classics, a monthly free screening as a part of an Essential Cinema program, and a variety of special programming including sing-alongs and themed all-night marathons. The Loft Cinema has hosted The Loft Kids Fest, a free 9-day festival for children, every summer since 2006 and The Loft Film Fest, an 8-day film festival in the fall showcasing independent, foreign, and classic films, since 2010.

== Recognition ==
The Loft Cinema was the first American festival member and second American theatre member of the International Confederation of Art Cinemas (CICAE). The Loft Cinema was a participant in Sundance Film Festival USA from 2012 until the program’s end in 2014, bringing world premieres and guests such as Oscar winner Brie Larson. In 2015, The Loft Cinema was recognized as a Sundance Institute Art House Project theater, a collaboration between Art House Convergence and Sundance Institute promoting “theaters in North America that embody a benchmark of excellence in programming, community involvement and operations”. In 2016 through The Loft's solar initiative, it has become the first American member of the Solar World Cinema with its solar powered mobile movie theatre.
