= Benning Heights =

Coordinates: 38.8817°N 76.9361°W

- Neighborhood of Washington, D.C.
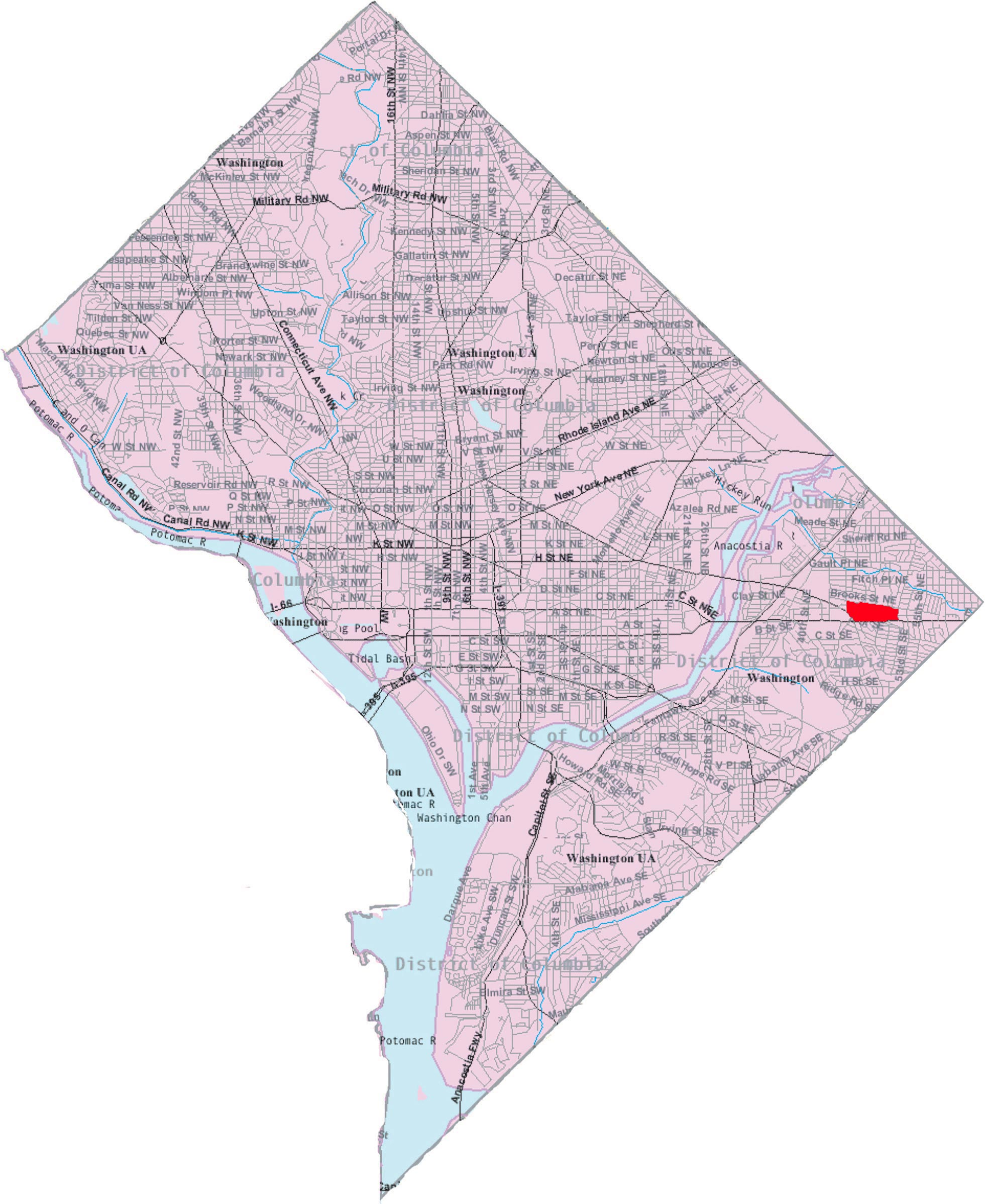
- Benning Heights within the District of Columbia
- Country: United States
- District: Washington, D.C.
- Ward: Ward 7

Government
  - Councilmember: Wendell Felder

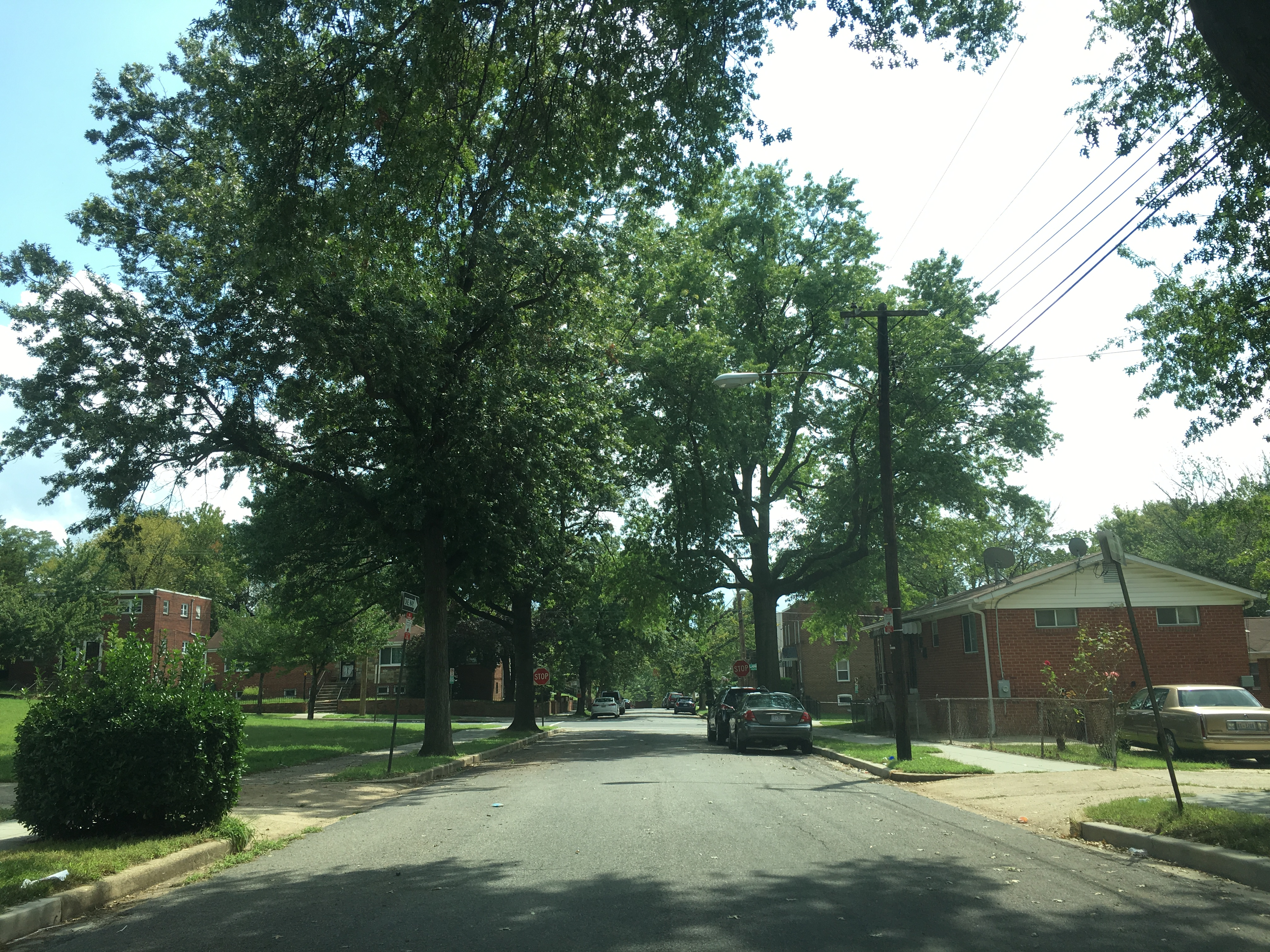
Benning Heights neighborhood at the intersection of 46th Pl and Blaine St. NE in September 2018

Benning Heights is a residential neighborhood located in northeast Washington, D.C. It is bounded by East Capitol Street to the south, Brooks Street NE to the north, 44th Street NE and Benning Road NE to the west, and Division Avenue NE to the east. It is served by the Benning Road Metro Rail station on the Blue Line and Silver Line of the Washington Metro (Washington Metropolitan Transit Authority/WMATA).

Politically, Benning Heights is in Ward 7.

== History ==
According to Benning Heights' Twists and Turns, within the neighborhood's boundaries "are the federal parks named for the former Civil War forts of Fort Circle and Fort Chaplin. Fort Dupont Park, also a former Civil War fortification, creates the long south-western border of the neighborhood along Ridge Road.

The neighborhood takes its name from early farmer and entrepreneur William Benning who owned most of the land in the neighborhood.

Near the Benning Road boundary is historic Woodlawn Cemetery (Washington, D.C.), a much-neglected, hilly burial ground for black and white Washington residents dating from 1895. Among prominent people buried there is Mississippi senator Branche K. Bruce, an African-American who made his home in the Shaw neighborhood."
