= Benning Road =

Major street in Washington D.C.

- Benning Road NE; Benning Road SE
- Interactive map of Benning Road
- Maintained by: DDOT
- Length: 3.9 mi (6.3 km)
- Location: Washington, D.C., U.S.
- Coordinates: 38°53′47.6″N 76°57′27.8″W
- West end: Starburst Intersection in Kingman Park–Carver Langston, D.C.
- Major junctions: DC 295 in Mayfair, D.C. East Capitol Street in Benning Ridge, D.C.
- East end: Marlboro Pike in Capitol Heights, MD

Benning Road is a major traveled street in Washington, D.C., and Prince George's County, Maryland.

The street's western terminus is at the Starburst Intersection in the Northeast quadrant of the city at Bladensburg Road, Florida Avenue, Maryland Avenue, H Street and 15th Street. It passes over the Anacostia River via the Ethel Kennedy Bridge into the neighborhood of Benning. It continues southeast across East Capitol Street into the Southeast quadrant, crossing Southern Avenue and the D.C.-Maryland boundary into Maryland, ending at an intersection with Marlboro Pike (a former alignment of Maryland Route 4).

== History ==
In the late 18th century, "Captain" William Benning came from Virginia and purchased 330 acres (1.3 km^{2}) in the area. Around 1830 (though not all sources agree on the date), he bought what was then known as the Anacostia Bridge or the Upper Bridge as a toll bridge, one of the earliest crossings over the Anacostia River. The bridge would later be known as "Benning Bridge." "Benning's Road" appears on maps as far back as 1861, and the bridge was an important eastern route in and out of the District. An 1886 U.S. Geological Survey map shows Benning's Road ending at "Bowen Road", which was later named Marlboro Pike in Maryland (and routed as Maryland Route 4 through about 1960).

In 1920, the Army Corps of Engineers used material dredged from the Anacostia to build Kingman Island and Kingman Lake, which Benning Road crossed over top of. Previously it had crossed the mudflats along the Anacostia on a causeway. In 1929, a concrete culvert was installed under Benning Road to create a connection between the two sections of Kingman Lake. At the time, 92% of the city's electricity passed under the road and the WB&A railroad ran along it. The bridge created by the culvert was replaced in 2000

In 1955, the department of transportation built two ramps connecting Benning Road to DC-295. In 1988, the ramp from 295 to Benning road was rehabilitated.

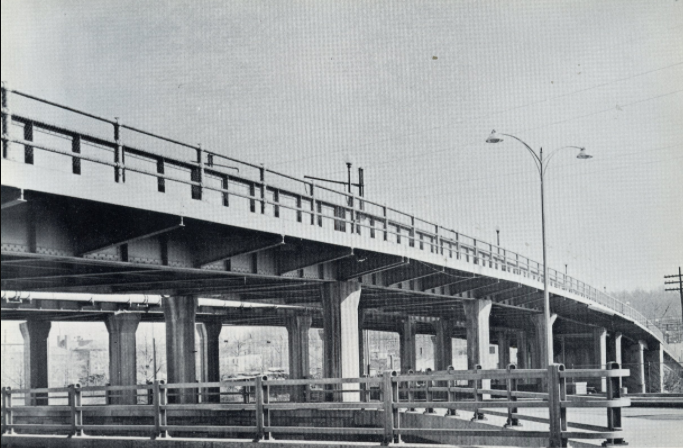
A 1956 photo of the original Benning Road Viaduct, built in 1919.

Benning Road was long bisected by railroad lines owned by the Philadelphia, Baltimore and Washington Railroad and the B&O Railroad. In 1917 work began on the Benning Road Viaduct and Bridge that would carry the road over the tracks. That work was completed in 1919. In 1937, the road was widened and a 2nd viaduct built next to the 1919 one. The old one became the eastbound bridge and the new one the westbound bridge. The westbound bridge was replaced in 1959 and the eastbound bridge in 1961, because the existing bridges could no longer carry the necessary weight. The westbound bridge had its entire deck removed and replaced in 1982 and the eastbound bridge deck was replaced in 1988. In 2007, the District Council voted to rename the Benning Road Viaduct and Bridge (by then called the "Benning Road Bridge") over the railroad tracks between 34th Street, N. E., and Minnesota Avenue, N. E. the Lorraine H. Whitlock Memorial Bridge. In 2020, the name was removed from the bridge by the same act that renamed a DC School for Whitlock.

In 2008, the Benning Road Bridge over the Anacostia was renamed the Ethel Kennedy Bridge after the widow of the late Robert F. Kennedy, for whom a nearby stadium was named. In a May 20, 2014 ceremony, the bridge was officially renamed the Ethel Kennedy Bridge to honor her for her devotion to many social and environmental causes during her later years, especially in the neighborhoods along and near the Anacostia River.

In 2009, work commenced on a $38 million improvement project for the road which included adding streetcar tracks. The DC Streetcar line was anticipated to open in 2014, but it did not actually open until February 27, 2016.

A Metro station was opened at the intersection of Benning Road and East Capitol Street in 1980 but this is not within easy walking distance of the local facilities as the neighborhood has a suburban style with access mainly by automobile.
