= 19th Avenue =

19th Avenue or 19 Av may refer to:

- 19th Avenue (Brooklyn), in New York
- 19th Avenue (San Francisco), in California
- 19th Avenue Bridge, in Minneapolis, Minnesota
- 19 Av, the nineteenth day of Av, the fifth month of the Hebrew calendar
