= Lincoln Heights (Washington, D.C.) =

Coordinates: 38.8941°N 76.9288°W

- Neighborhood of Washington, D.C.
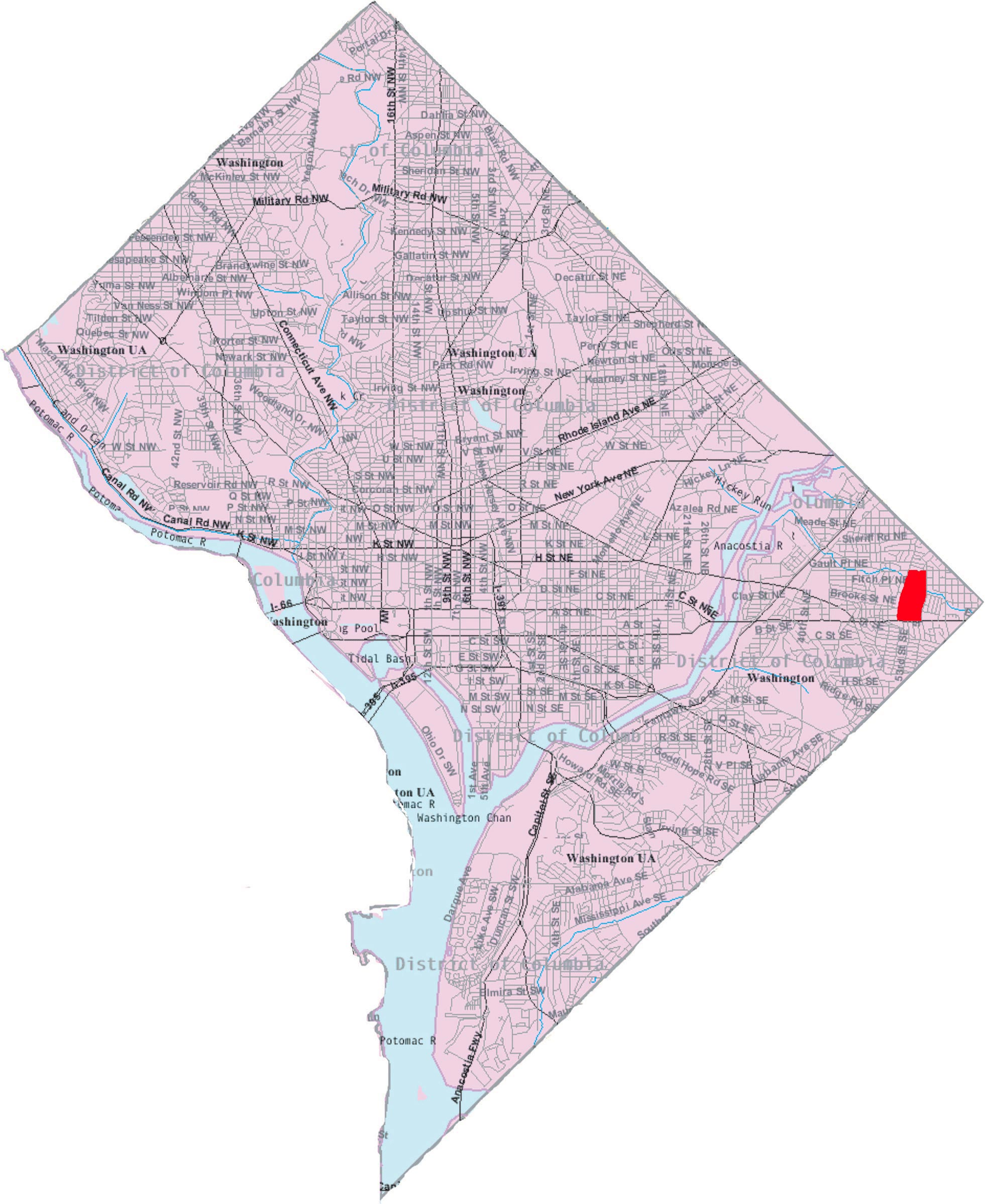
- Lincoln Heights within the District of Columbia
- Country: United States
- District: Washington, D.C.
- Ward: Ward 7

Government
  - Councilmember: Wendell Felder

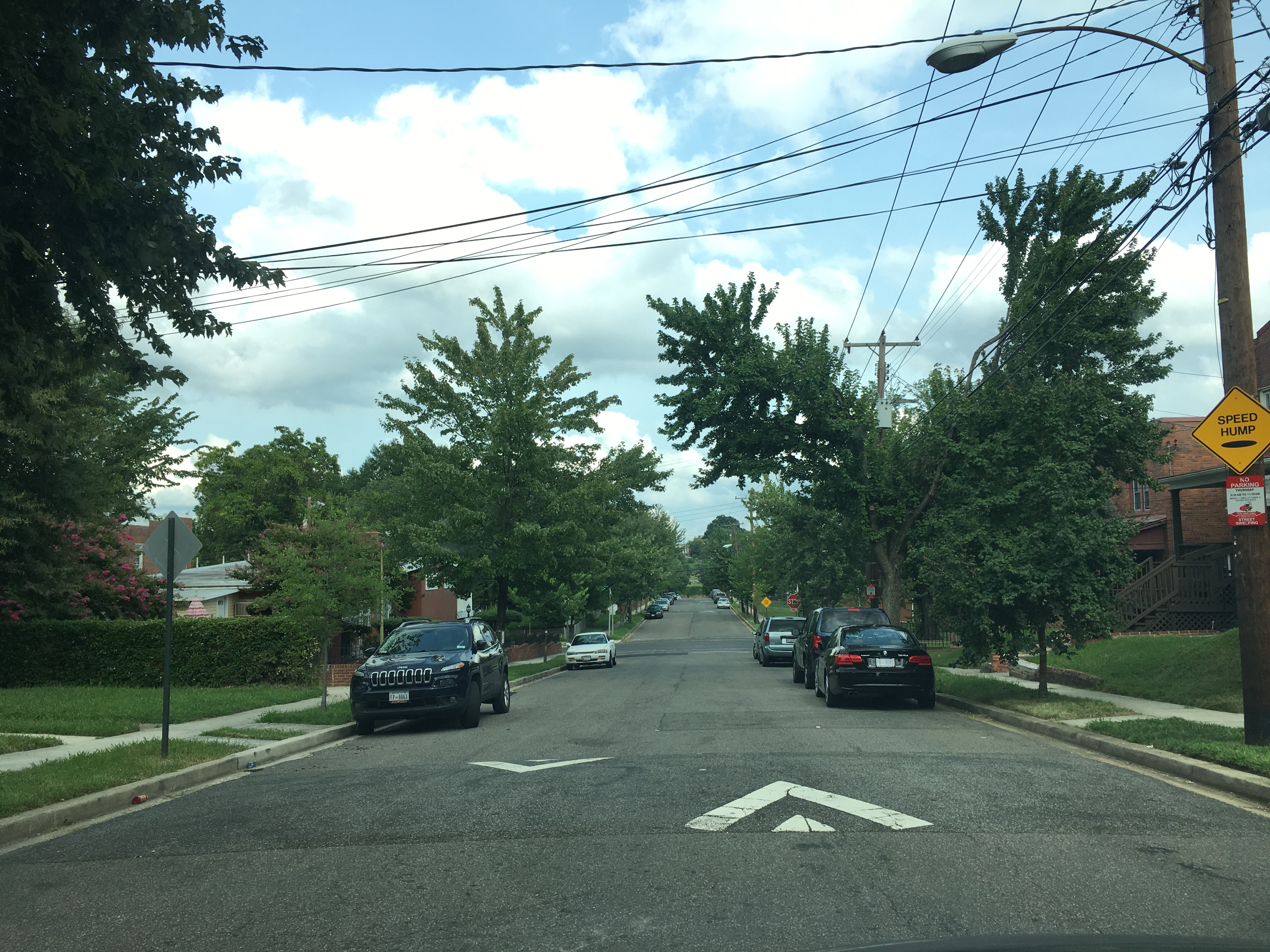
Lincoln Heights neighborhood at the intersection of Ames St and 53rd St NE looking East, August 2018

Lincoln Heights is a residential neighborhood in Northeast Washington, D.C. It is bounded by Nannie Helen Burroughs Avenue NE, Division Avenue NE, East Capitol Street NE, and 58th Street NE.

The neighborhood is almost entirely composed of the Lincoln Heights Housing Project, a 325-unit public housing complex with low-rise apartment buildings and townhouses ranging from one bedroom to four bedrooms. The complex is run by the District of Columbia Housing Authority.
