= Mayfair (Washington, D.C.) =

Coordinates: 38°54′06″N 76°57′07″W

- Neighborhood of Washington, D.C.
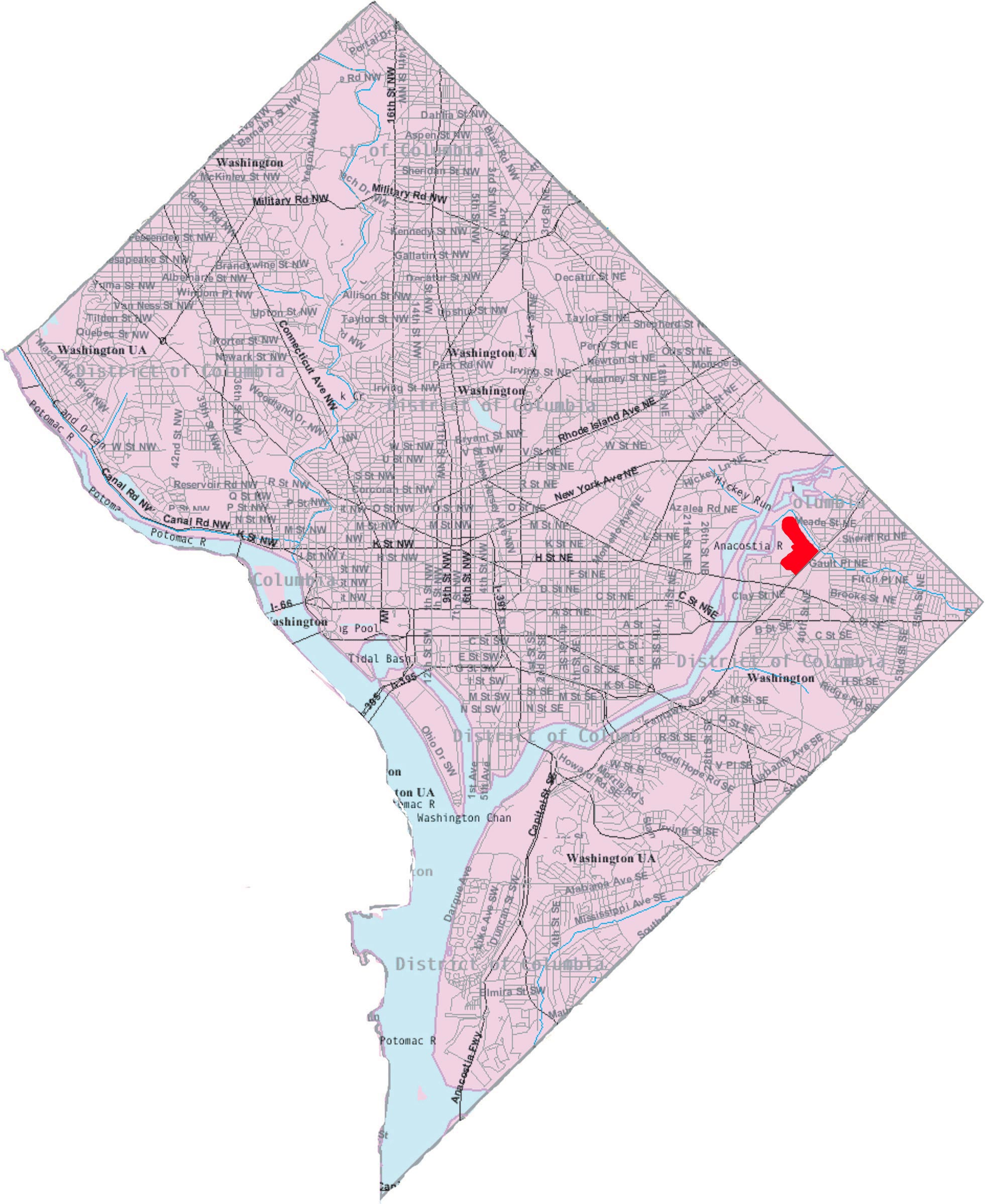
- Mayfair within the District of Columbia
- Country: United States
- District: Washington, D.C.
- Ward: Ward 7

Government
  - Councilmember: Wendell Felder

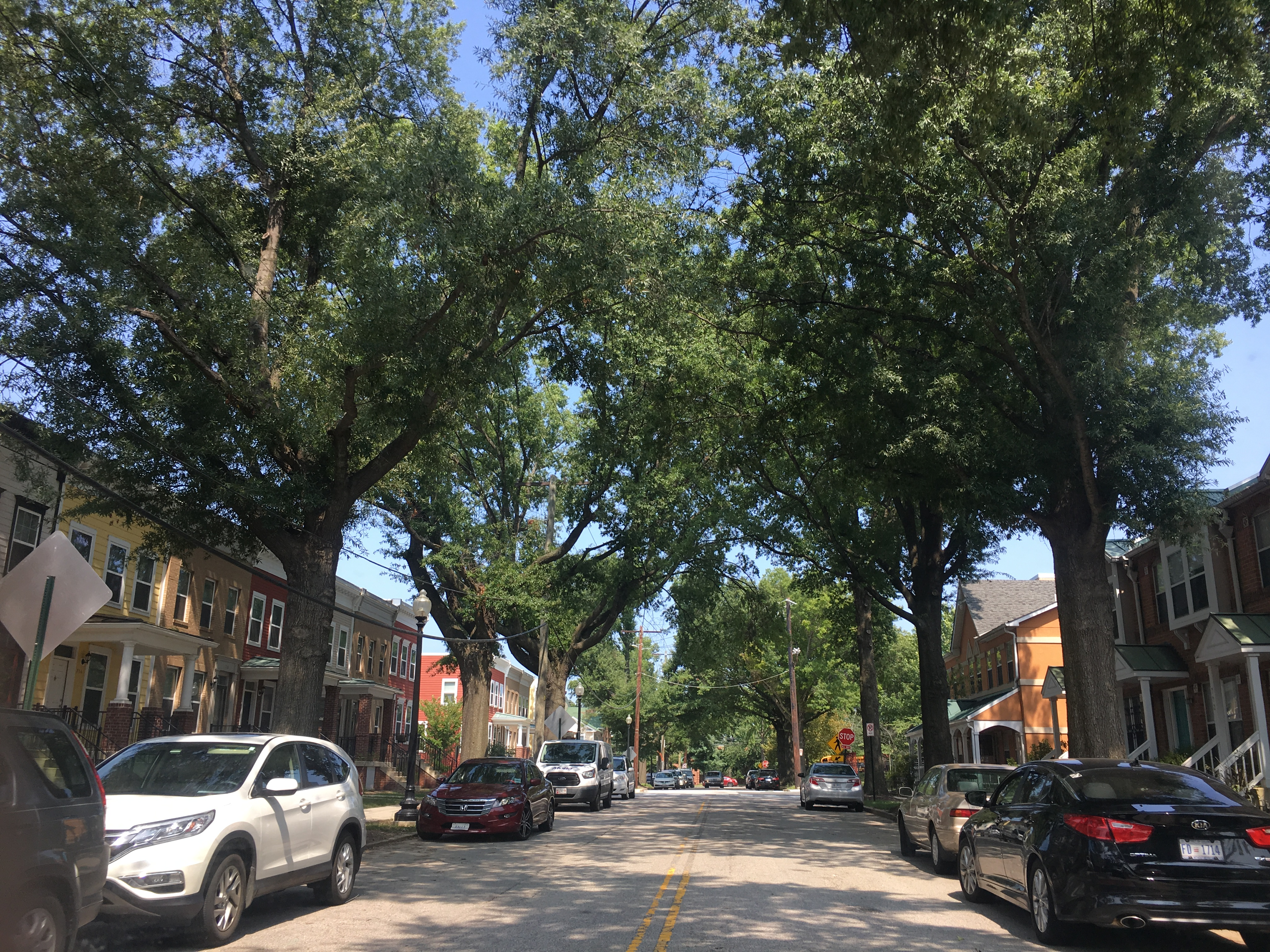
The Mayfair neighborhood at the intersection of Barnes St. and Cassell Pl in August 2018

Mayfair or Parkside-Mayfair is a residential neighborhood in Northeast Washington, D.C., United States., on the eastern bank of the Anacostia River. It is bounded by Jay Street NE, Foote Street NE, Kenilworth Terrace NE, Anacostia Avenue NE, and Kenilworth Avenue NE. Mayfair is encircled by Jay Street and Hayes St., which met at the back of the neighborhood.

Nearby schools include Neval Thomas Elementary, located on Anacostia Avenue, Cesar Chavez Public Charter School For Public Policy (Parkside middle and high school), located on Hayes Street NE, and just over the bridge crossing I-295, Friendship Collegiate Academy, Carter G. Woodson Campus.

== Notable residents ==
- Marvin Gaye, singer
- Clifton Powell, actor
- Wendell Felder, DC Ward 7 Councilmember
