= Benning Road station =

Washington Metro station

Coordinates: 38°53′25.5″N 76°56′15.5″W

Benning Road
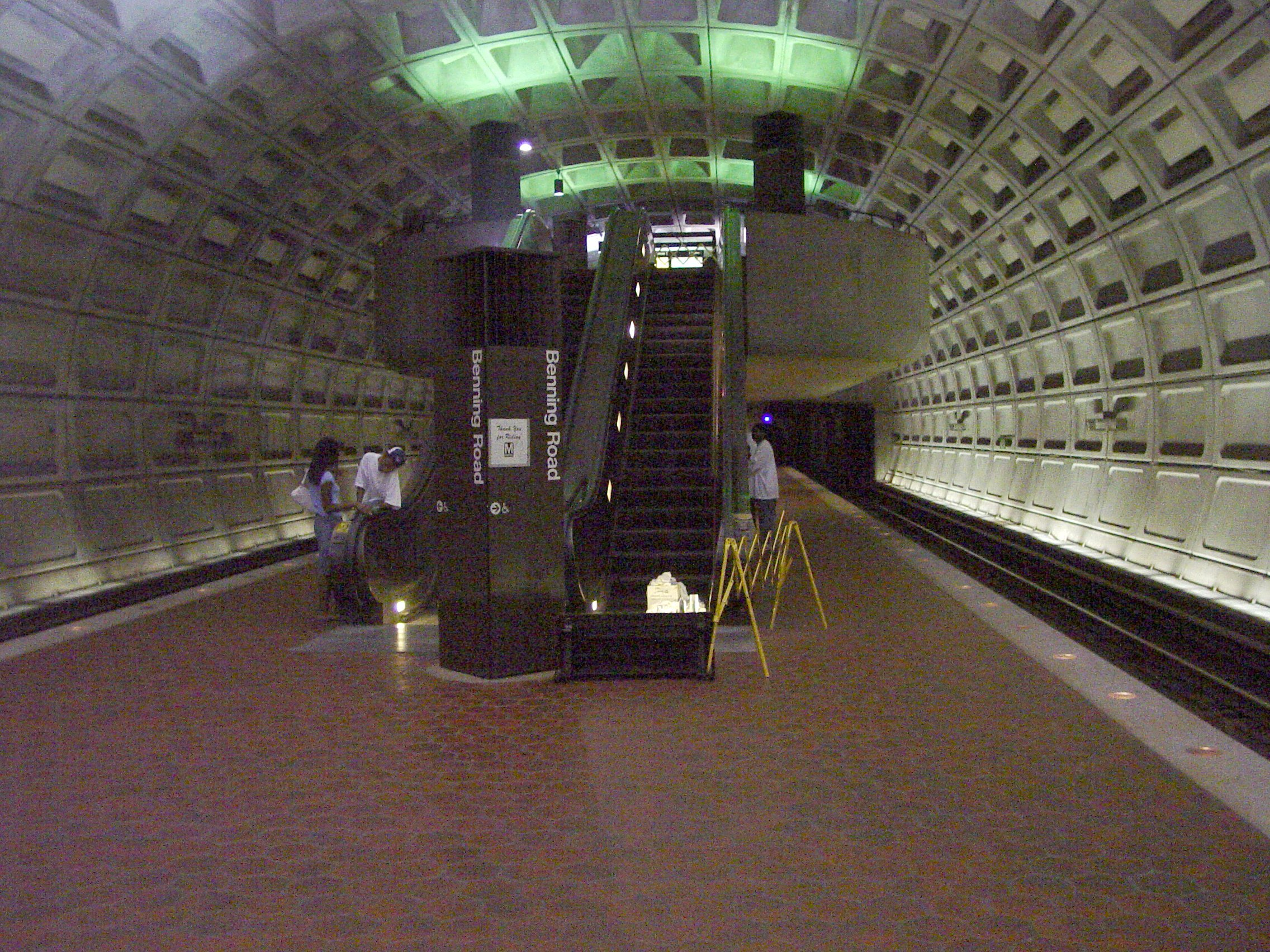
- Benning Road station platform facing east in July 2004

General information
- Location: 4500 Benning Road NE; Washington, D.C.
- Owner: Washington Metropolitan Area Transit Authority
- Platforms: 1 island platform
- Tracks: 2
- Connections: Metrobus: C21, C23, C37, C57, D24, D2X

Construction
- Structure type: Underground
- Cycle facilities: Capital Bikeshare, 4 racks
- Accessible: Yes

Other information
- Station code: G01

History
- Opened: November 22, 1980; 45 years ago

Passengers
- 2025: 2,094 (average weekday)
- Rank: 76 of 98

Services
Preceding station	Washington Metro	Following station
Stadium–Armory toward Ashburn	Silver Line	Capitol Heights toward Downtown Largo
Stadium–Armory toward Franconia–Springfield	Blue Line	Capitol Heights toward Downtown Largo
Former services
Preceding station	Washington Metro	Following station
Stadium–Armory toward Vienna	Orange Line	Capitol Heights toward Downtown Largo
Route map
Location

Benning Road station is an island-platformed Washington Metro station in the Benning neighborhood of Northeast Washington, D.C., United States. The station was opened on November 22, 1980, and is operated by the Washington Metropolitan Area Transit Authority (WMATA). Providing service for the Blue and Silver Lines, the station is located in a residential area near the intersection of Benning Road and East Capitol Street. It is the first station after the Blue and Silver Lines diverge from the Orange Line east of the Anacostia River, and also the last station in the District of Columbia going east.

== History ==
The station opened on November 22, 1980, and coincided with the completion of 3.52 miles (5.66 km) of rail east of the Stadium–Armory station and the opening of the Addison Road and Capitol Heights stations.

In December 2012, Benning Road was one of five stations added to the route of the Silver Line, which was originally supposed to end at the Stadium–Armory station, but was extended into Prince George's County, Maryland, to Largo (the eastern terminus of the Blue Line) due to safety concerns about a pocket track just east of Stadium–Armory. Silver Line service at Benning Road began on July 26, 2014.
