= Benning Heights–M Street Line =

V1
- Benning Heights–M Street Line

Overview
- System: Metrobus
- Operator: Washington Metropolitan Area Transit Authority
- Garage: Southern Avenue
- Livery: Local
- Status: Eliminated
- Began service: 1991
- Ended service: September 5, 2021
- Predecessors: V7, V8, V9

Route
- Locale: Southeast, Southwest
- Communities served: Benning Heights, Greenway, Navy Yard
- Landmarks served: Benning Heights, Greenway, Minnesota Ave. S.E., Randle Circle, Potomac Avenue station, Navy Yard–Ballpark station, Waterfront station, L'Enfant Plaza station, Department of Agriculture, Bureau of Engraving, Smithsonian station
- Start: Benning Heights (Hanna Place & Benning Road SE) (AM start) (H Street & Benning Road SE) (PM end)
- Via: Minnesota Avenue NE, M Street, Pennsylvania Avenue, 7th Street SW
- End: Smithsonian station
- Length: 55 minutes

Service
- Level: Weekday Peak-Hour Service Only
- Frequency: 20-30 minutes
- Operates: 5:04 AM – 8:50 AM; 2:55 PM – 6:55 PM
- Transfers: SmarTrip only
- Timetable: Benning Heights–M Street Line

The Benning Heights–M Street Line, designated Route V1, was a weekday peak-hour only bus route operated by the Washington Metropolitan Area Transit Authority between the neighborhood of Benning Heights and Smithsonian station of the Blue, Orange, and Silver Lines of the Washington Metro. The line ran only every 20–30 minutes in the weekday peak-hour direction. Trips took roughly 55 minutes.

== Background ==
Route V1 provided service between the neighborhood of Benning Heights, located in northeast Washington, D.C., and Smithsonian station, mostly running along M Street, Pennsylvania Avenue, and Minnesota Avenue in the weekday peak-hour direction only. This route provided Benning Heights residents easy access to Downtown without having to take the train. Route V1 operated out of Southern Avenue division.

== History ==
Route V1 originally operated as part of the Pan Am Parking Lot/Vienna Shuttle Line between Vienna/Fairfax–GMU station and Pan Am Shopping Center until January 22, 2001 when it was discontinued due to the new garage on the south side of Vienna/Fairfax-GMU station opened on January 18, 2001.

The current Benning Heights–M Street Line was created as the Minnesota Ave-M St Line on December 28, 1991 under routes V7, V8, and V9. These routes replace the former route V4 from Minnesota Avenue station. The V4 was discontinued while a new V6 was introduced to operate alongside V7, V8 & V9 at their inception.

Route V6 would operate between Deanwood station and Half & O Streets SW. Route V6 mostly operated along Kenilworth Avenue Service Road, Minnesota Avenue NE, M Street, Pennsylvania Avenue and then terminated at Half & O Streets SW.

Route V7 would operate on weekdays only between Deanwood station and the Bureau of Engraving at Smithsonian station following most of V6 routing except running more along 7th Street SW then turned on D street, 12th street, and C street to terminate at Smithsonian station along 14th Street and Independence Avenue. Route V7 will end at Navy Yard–Ballpark station during late night service on weekdays and early morning and late nights on weekends.

Route V8 would operate on weekends only following the same route as the V7 from Deanwood station but would be remain straight along 7th street and be extended to Archives station.

Route V9 would operate between Benning Heights (H Street & Benning Road SE) and Bureau of Engraving at Smithsonian station along route V7 routing during weekday peak-hours in the peak direction only. Route V9 would operate along H street, Alabama Avenue, and Ridge Road before joining route V7 and V8 routing up to Potomac Avenue.

=== Changes ===
In 1996, route V6 was discontinued after the Half & O Streets SW portion of the route was eliminated in favor of route 70's increased frequency in the area. Service was also further replaced by routes V7, V8, and V9.

On June 25, 2000, route V8 service along Half & O Streets SW was discontinued south of M Street. Service was replaced by route 70 and 71.

During WMATA's FY2014 budget, a series of proposals were mentioned for routes V7, V8, and V9.

One option was proposed to extend route V7 and V8 to Walter E. Washington Convention Center and divert onto M Street SW via Delaware Avenue SW, Canal Street SW, P Street SW, 4th Street SW, M Street SW, and 6th Street SW to serve Navy Yard in order to replace route 74 which was proposed to be discontinued. However, routes V7 and V8 will discontinue service between Minnesota Avenue station and Deanwood station having it replaced by a proposed route U2 extension from Minnesota Avenue station. WMATA reasons that there was low ridership on routes in Southwest and the reroutes would provide a better balance of capacity and demand.

The second option was to shorten route V9 from Smithsonian station to Potomac Avenue station having it replaced by route V7.

On March 30, 2014, route V9 was shorten to Navy Yard–Ballpark station with service to Smithsonian station replaced by route V7.

WMATA launched a study on its current U and V lines in April 2014 in order to improve and simplify the lines. Under the study, it goes as the following to routes U2, V7, V8, and V9:

- Route U2 will have daily service at all times between Capitol Heights station and Anacostia station via the current U8 route between Capitol Heights station and Minnesota Avenue station via Nannie Helen Burroughs Avenue, then via the current U2 route to Anacostia station.
- Routes V7, V8 will have daily service at all times between Capitol Heights station and Navy Yard–Ballpark station via the current U8 route between Capitol Heights station and Minnesota Avenue station, then via the current V7 and V8 routing to Navy Yard Ballpark station. The routing between Deanwood Station and Minnesota Avenue stations will be replaced by a proposed route U4 re-route. Service to Bureau of Engraving and Smithsonian station will be replaced by a re-extended route V9.
- Route V9 will be re-extended back to the Bureau of Engraving via the current V9 route between Benning Heights and Navy Yard Ballpark station, then via the current V7 route to Bureau of Engraving in order to replace route V7 and V8.

The reason for the changes was to enhance connectivity between points of regional demand, create a better balance of capacity and demand lines serving the Minnesota Avenue, and reduce or eliminate service with low productivity on the line. According to WMATA. there will be approximately 700 of 5,300 weekday passenger trips (13%), 750 of 3,200 Saturday passenger trips (23%) and 600 of 2,900 Sunday passenger trips (21%) that will be affected by shortening routes V7 and V8 at Navy Yard Station if the changes occur. Weekday passengers affected may be less due to the proposed extension of route V9.

The final report was later released in March 2015.

On June 21, 2015, routes V7 and V8 were discontinued and replaced by new routes V2 and V4 which were a combination of routes U2, U8, V7, and V8 running between Capitol Heights station and Anacostia station (V2)/Navy Yard–Ballpark station (V4) running on U8's routing between Capitol Heights and Deanwood, then on U2, V7, and V8 routing to Anacostia/Navy Yark-Ballpark.

Route V9 was renamed Route V1 which was re-extended back to the Bureau of Engraving along the former V7 routing between Navy Yard-Ballpark and Bureau of Engraving. The line was also renamed the Benning Heights–M Street Line as the route no longer serves Minnesota Avenue station.

On June 26, 2016, eastbound V1 trips were extended to H Street and Benning Road SE.

During WMATA's FY2021 budget, it was proposed to eliminate route V1 due to declining ridership with alternative service provided by routes 54, P6, U5, U6, and V8. According to performance measures from WMATA, it goes as the following:

Date	Average Daily Passengers	Passengers Per Trip	Passengers Per Revenue Mile	Passengers Per Revenue Hour	Max Load (% of Seats)
September 2017	747	32.5	4.3	26.9	33 (84%)
September 2018	694	30.2	3.9	31.7	32 (81%)
September 2019	695	29.9	3.8	31.3	33 (83%)

However WMATA later backed out the elimination on March 31, 2020.

All route V1 service was suspended beginning on March 16, 2020 due to Metro's response to the COVID-19 pandemic. On September 26, 2020, WMATA proposed to eliminate all V1 service due to low federal funds. The proposal went through and by September 5, 2021, the route was eliminated

=== Reincarnation of routes V7 and V8 ===
After a series of proposals in 2017, routes V7 and V8 were reincarnated into the Benning Heights–Alabama Avenue Line on June 24, 2018. Route U8 was renamed route V8 operating between Minnesota Avenue station and Benning Heights (H & 46th Streets SE) daily while route V7 would operate between Minnesota Avenue station and Congress Heights station operating along Southern and Alabama Avenues during weekday peak-hours only.
