= H Street Limited =

D2X
- H Street Limited

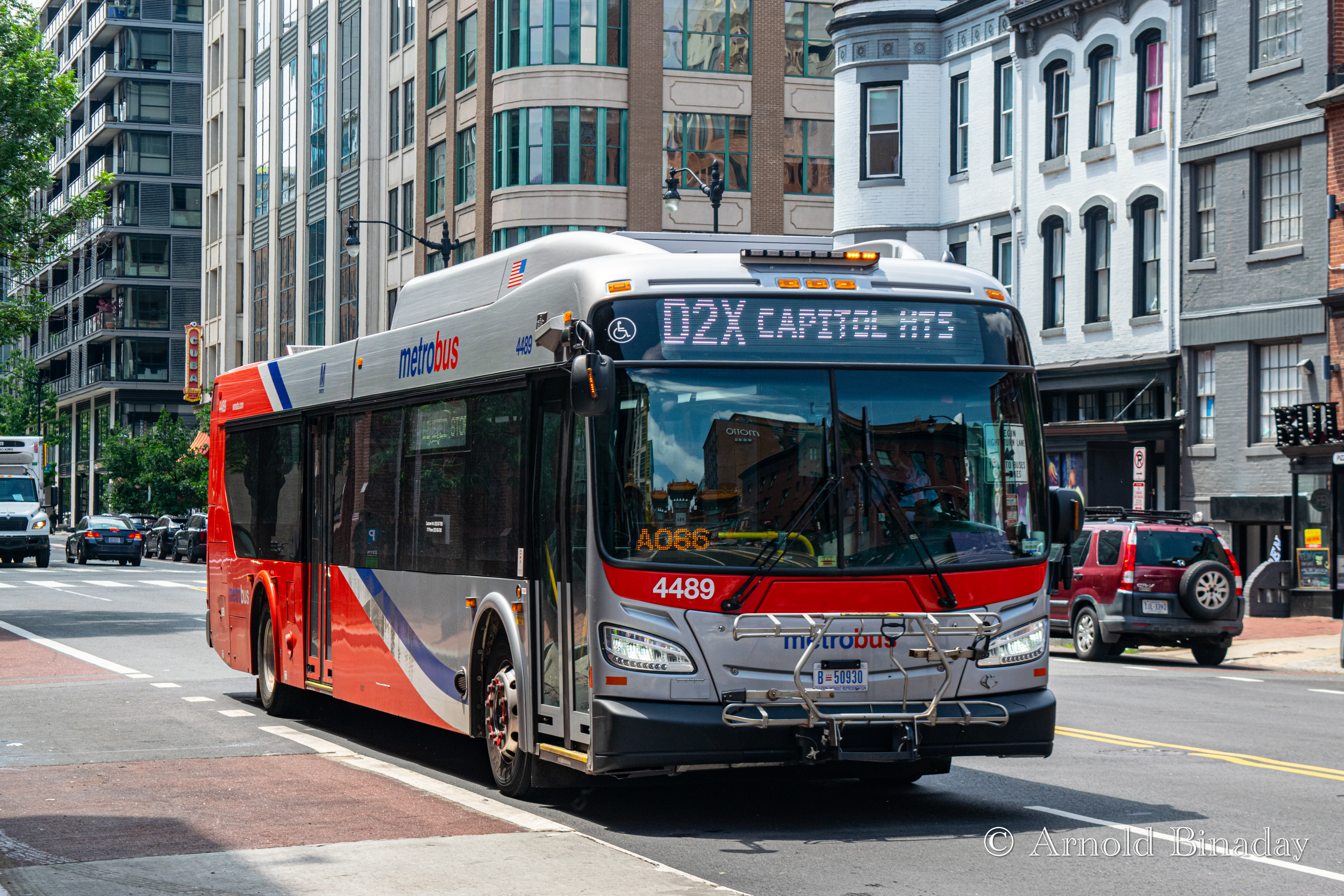
- Route D2X at Gallery Place-Chinatown

Overview
- System: Metrobus
- Operator: Washington Metropolitan Area Transit Authority
- Garage: Andrews Federal Center
- Status: In Service
- Began service: 2010
- Predecessors: X9

Route
- Locale: Northwest, Northeast, Prince George's County
- Communities served: Capitol Heights, Central Northeast, Downtown, Chinatown
- Landmarks served: Capitol Heights station, Benning Road station, Benning Road, Hechinger Mall, H Street, Washington Union Station, Union Station, Government Publishing Office, Capital One Arena, Gallery Place station
- Start: Capitol Heights station
- Via: H Street NW/NE, Benning Road NE, East Capitol Street
- End: Gallery Place station
- Other routes: D20 H Street Local

Service
- Level: Weekday service only
- Frequency: 15 minutes
- Operates: 6:00 AM - 10:00 PM
- Ridership: 758,482 (FY 2025)
- Transfers: SmarTrip only
- Timetable: Benning Road-H Street Limited Line

The H Street Limited, designated Route D2X, is a limited stop Metrobus bus route operated by the Washington Metropolitan Area Transit Authority between Capitol Heights station, which is served by the Blue and Silver lines of the Washington Metro, and Gallery Place station, which is served by the Red, Green and Yellow lines of the Washington Metro. The line operates every 15 minutes at all times on weekdays only. Trips are roughly 50 minutes long. This line provides additional service along the H Street corridor supplementing route D20.

== Background ==
Route D2X operates on weekdays only between Capitol Heights station and Gallery Place station. This route provides additional service to route D20 along H Street and Benning Road. Route D2X operates out of Andrews Federal Center, having previously operated out of Bladensburg, Shepherd Parkway, and Southern Avenue Annex. The route would only serve all local stops if there was moderate snow conditions.

=== Stops ===
Bus stop	Direction	Connections
Prince George's County, Maryland
Capitol Heights Bus Bay B	Eastbound terminal, Westbound station	Metrobus: C31, C57, P63; TheBus: P65; Washington Metro:
Washington, D.C.
East Capitol Street / 58th Street NE/SE	Bidirectional	Metrobus: C57
East Capitol Street / 57th Place NE	Westbound	Metrobus: C57
East Capitol Street / 56th Place SE	Eastbound	Metrobus: C57
East Capitol Street / 55th Street NE/SE	Bidirectional	Metrobus: C57
East Capitol Street / 53rd Place NE	Eastbound	Metrobus: C57
East Capitol Street / 53rd Street SE	Westbound	Metrobus: C57
East Capitol Street / 52nd Street SE	Eastbound	Metrobus: C57
East Capitol Street / 50th Street NE/SE	Bidirectional	Metrobus: C23, C37, C57, D24
East Capitol Street / Sycamore Road NE	Westbound	Metrobus: C23, C37, C57, D24
East Capitol Street / 49th Street SE	Eastbound	Metrobus: C23, C37, C57, D24
East Capitol Street / 47th Street NE/SE	Bidirectional	Metrobus: C23, C37, C57, D24
East Capitol Street / 46th Street SE Benning Road station	Eastbound	Metrobus: C21, C23, C37, C57, D24; Washington Metro:
East Capitol Street / Benning Road NE Benning Road station	Westbound	Metrobus: C21, C23, C37, C57, D24; Washington Metro:
Benning Road NE / 45th Street NE Benning Road station	Westbound	Metrobus: C21, C23, C37, C57, D24; Washington Metro:
Benning Road NE / 44th Street NE	Bidirectional	Metrobus: C21, C57
Benning Road NE / 42nd Street NE	Bidirectional	Metrobus: C21, C57
Benning Road NE / 41st Street NE	Bidirectional	Metrobus: C21, C57
Benning Road NE / 40th Street NE	Bidirectional	Metrobus: C21, C57
Benning Road NE / 39th Street NE	Eastbound	Metrobus: C21, C31, C33, C35, C37, C57, D20
Benning Road NE / Minnesota Avenue NE	Westbound	Metrobus: C21, C31, C33, C35, C37, C57, D20
Benning Road NE / 19th Street NE	Bidirectional	Metrobus: D20
Benning Road NE / 16th Street NE	Westbound	Metrobus: C41, C43, D20
Benning Road NE / 15th Street NE	Eastbound	Metrobus: C41, C43, D20
H Street NE / 14th Street NE	Bidirectional	Metrobus: C41, C43, D20
H Street NE / 8th Street NE	Bidirectional	Metrobus: C53, D20
H Street NE / Union Station Garage	Bidirectional	Amtrak, VRE, MARC at Union Station; Metrobus: C43, C51, C55, C71, D20, D24, D30, D80; MTA Maryland Bus: 903, 922; Loudoun County Transit; PRTC OmniRide; Washington Metro: at Union Station
H Street NW / North Capitol Street	Bidirectional	Metrobus: C71, D20, D30
H Street NW / 7th Street NW Gallery Place-Chinatown	Bidirectional	Metrobus: D20, D24, D30, D34, D36, D40, D4X, D80, D94; Washington Metro:
9th Street NW / G Street NW Gallery Place-Chinatown	Eastbound station, Westbound terminal	Metrobus: D20, D24, D30, D34, D36, D40, D4X, D94; Washington Metro:

== History ==
Before WMATA implemented the Better Bus Redesign network, Route D2X was previously known as Routes X9. Route X9 originally operated as part of the East Capitol Street Express Line which operated alongside the Benning Road Line with routes X1, X2, X3, X4, X5, X6, and X7. Route X9 originally operated between Capitol Heights station and Federal Triangle but was discontinued in the late 1980s and replaced by the Benning Road Line.

In 2010, WMATA released a study along the H Street and Benning Road corridor. As ridership increases along the corridor and consistent delays on the DC Streetcar, WMATA proposed a brand new route X9 to operate between Capitol Heights station and Metro Center station. This was to reduce crowding during the weekday peak-hours and to replace route X3.

On December 19, 2010, route X9 was introduce as a new express bus route to primarily operate along H Street, Benning Road and Nannie Helen Burroughs Avenue. This new route will operate during the weekday peak-hours between Capitol Heights station and Metro Center station. The new X9 will supplement route U2 between Capitol Heights and Minnesota Avenue station and route X2 between Minnesota Avenue and Metro Center.

In June 2012, WMATA announced that the "express" brand for Metro will be renamed into the MetroExtra brand. Route X9 was slowly converted into the MetroExtra brand in the fall of 2012. There were no major changes to the routing.

On September 26, 2017, as part of WMATA's FY2018 budget, WMATA proposed to add midday service to route X9. This proposed was in part to customer demand and requests and jurisdictional coordination and responds to requests by the District Department of Transportation. Route X9 will provides additional limited-stop capacity to accommodate new riders in the Benning Road-H Street corridor during the weekday midday to help route X2 and provide a weekday midday transfer-free ride throughout the entire corridor on proposed Route X9 between downtown DC and Capitol Heights station. This proposal was also recommended in the 2010 Benning Road-H Street Lines Service Evaluation Study.

On June 24, 2018, route X9 was given new weekday midday service which will operate every 15 minutes between Minnesota Avenue station and Metro Center station. Differences in the routing was route X9 will enter the Minnesota Avenue bus bays during the midday hours while during weekday peak-hours, the route would serve the on-street bus stop at Minnesota Avenue.

Route X9 was suspended during the COVID-19 pandemic on March 16, 2020. Route X9 returned to service on August 23, 2020.

In February 2021 during WMATA's FY2022 budget crisis, WMATA proposed to eliminate the X9 portion between Minnesota Avenue and Capitol Heights station beginning in January 2022. Subsequently on April 22, 2021, WMATA approved the FY2022 budget and received federal funding to avoid service cuts.

On December 11, 2022, all westbound X9 trips was shortened to terminate at Gallery Place station.

In 2024 during WMATA's FY2024 Budget crisis, WMATA proposed to eliminate all X9 service between Minnesota Avenue station and Capital Heights station. However on April 25, 2024, Metro’s Board of Directors approved a $4.8 billion capital and operating budget which avoided service cuts.

=== Better Bus Redesign ===
In 2022, WMATA launched its Better Bus Redesign project, which aimed to redesign the entire Metrobus Network and is the first full redesign of the agency's bus network in its history.

In April 2023, WMATA launched its Draft Visionary Network. As part of the drafts, WMATA proposed to have two routes operate along H Street, as Route DC112 between Farragut Square and Capitol Heights station via H Street NE, Benning Road NE, and East Capitol Street, and Route DC113 between Gallery Place station/Metro Center station and Minnesota Avenue station via H Street NE, Benning Road NE, and Minnesota Avenue NE. These routes were essentially the X2 and X9 but with swapped eastern terminals.

During WMATA's Revised Draft Visionary Network, WMATA renamed the DC112 to Route D2X and have the route operate between Farragut Square and Capitol Heights, making limited stops weekdays only. WMATA also renamed the DC113 to Route D22 and have the route operate between Gallery Place station/Metro Center station and Minnesota Avenue station with late night service being extended to Foggy Bottom. All changes were then proposed during WMATA's 2025 Proposed Network.

During the proposals, Route D22 was renamed to Route D20 and was changed to swap terminals with the D2X with the D20 now operating to Farragut Square and the D2X terminating at Gallery Place station.

On November 21, 2024, WMATA approved its Better Bus Redesign Network, with service on the H Street Limited Line being simplified.

Beginning on June 29, 2025, the X9 was renamed into the D2X, mostly keeping the same routing. However the route no longer serves Minnesota Avenue station and continues along Benning Road NE and turns onto East Capitol Street NE, serving Benning Road station in the process and terminates at Capitol Heights station.

In March 2026 during WMATA FY2027 budget proposal, WMATA proposed to give new weekend service to Route D2X, operating every 15 minutes. Subsequently the proposal was approved on April 23, 2026 with weekend service for Route D2X expected to begin in December 2026.
