= Alabama Avenue Line =

C21, C23
- Alabama Avenue–Benning Road; Alabama Avenue–Division Avenue

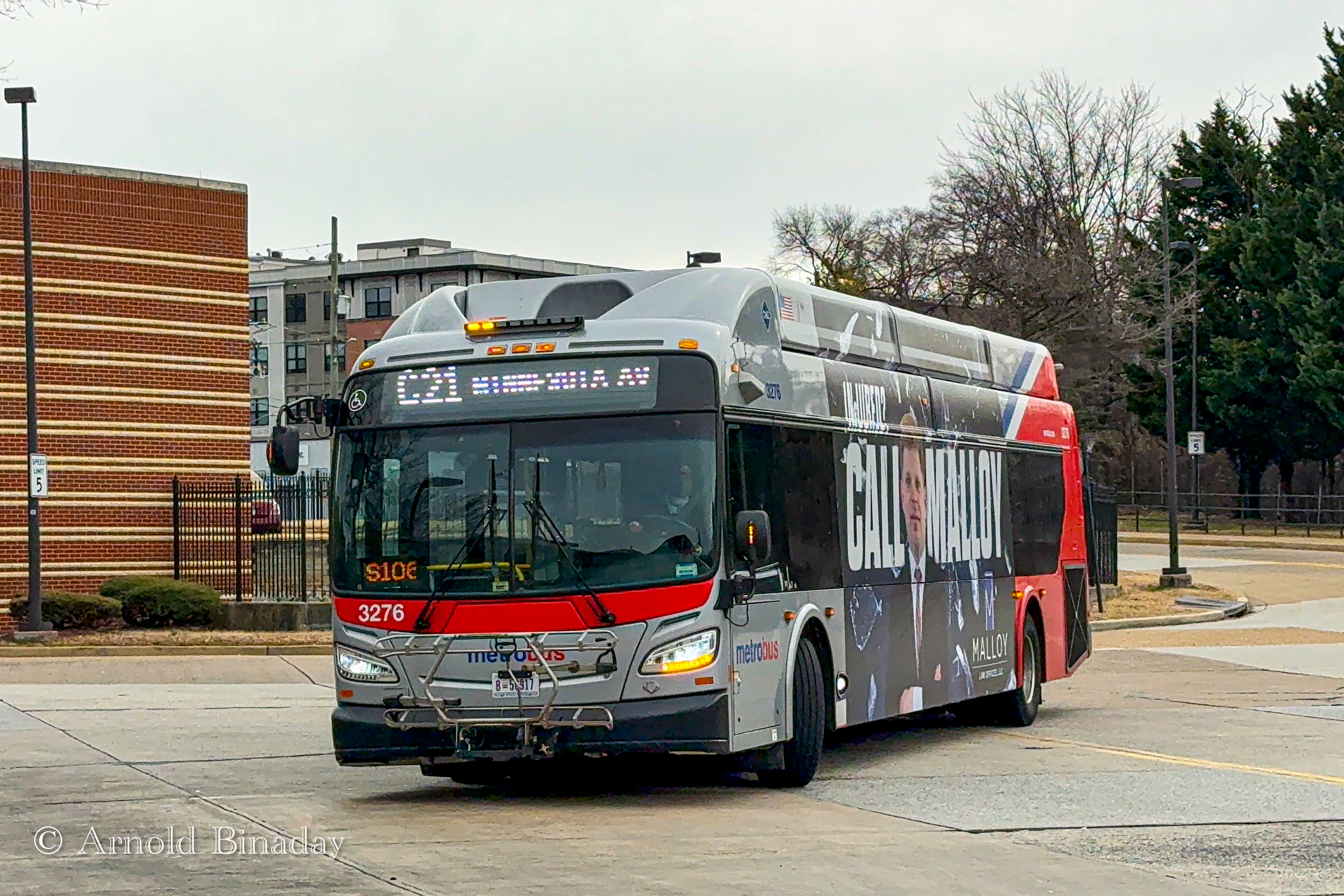
- Route C21 at Anacostia station

Overview
- System: Metrobus
- Operator: Washington Metropolitan Area Transit Authority
- Garage: Shepherd Parkway
- Livery: Local
- Status: Active
- Began service: 1933
- Predecessors: U8, V7, V8, W4, X2, X4

Route
- Locale: Northeast, Southeast
- Communities served: Deanwood, Central Northeast, Benning Heights, Bradbury Heights, Fairfax Village, Skyland, Garfield, Congress Heights, Anacostia
- Landmarks served: Benning Road station, Bradbury Heights, Fairfax Village, Skyland, Garfield (C21), Congress Heights station (C21), CareFirst Arena (C21), Frederick Douglass National Historic Site (C23)
- Start: C21: Minnesota Avenue station C23: Deanwood station
- Via: Benning Road NE/SE (C21), Division Avenue NE (C23), Texas Avenue SE (C23), Southern Avenue (C21), Alabama Avenue SE, Marion Barry Avenue SE (C23), South Capitol Street (C21)
- End: Anacostia station

Service
- Level: Daily
- Frequency: C21: 10 - 20 Minutes; C23: 30 Minutes
- Operates: C21: 24 Hours; C23: 6:00 AM - 12:00 AM
- Ridership: 382,076 (V7, FY 2025); 552,698 (V8, FY 2025); 3,150,059 (W4, FY 2025)
- Transfers: SmarTrip only
- Timetable: Alabama Avenue-Benning Road Line; Alabama Avenue-Division Avenue Line

The Alabama Avenue Line, designated as Alabama Avenue-Benning Road on Route C21, and Alabama Avenue–Division Avenue on Route C23, are daily bus routes operated by the Washington Metropolitan Area Transit Authority between Minnesota Avenue station (C21) and Deanwood station (C23) of the Orange and Silver Lines of the Washington Metro and Anacostia station of the Green Line of the Washington Metro. Route C21 operates daily every 10 - 12 minutes during the daytime and every 15 - 20 minutes during late nights, while Route C23 operates daily every 30 minutes. Both routes are roughly 50 minutes long.

== Background ==
Routes C21 and C23 operate between Minnesota Avenue station (C21) / Deanwood station (C23) and Anacostia station daily, providing service along Alabama Avenue SE. Route C21 operates 24 hours every 10-20 minutes while Route C23 operates every 30 minutes daily between 6:00 AM to 12:00 AM.

Both routes operate out of Shepherd Parkway garage.

== History ==
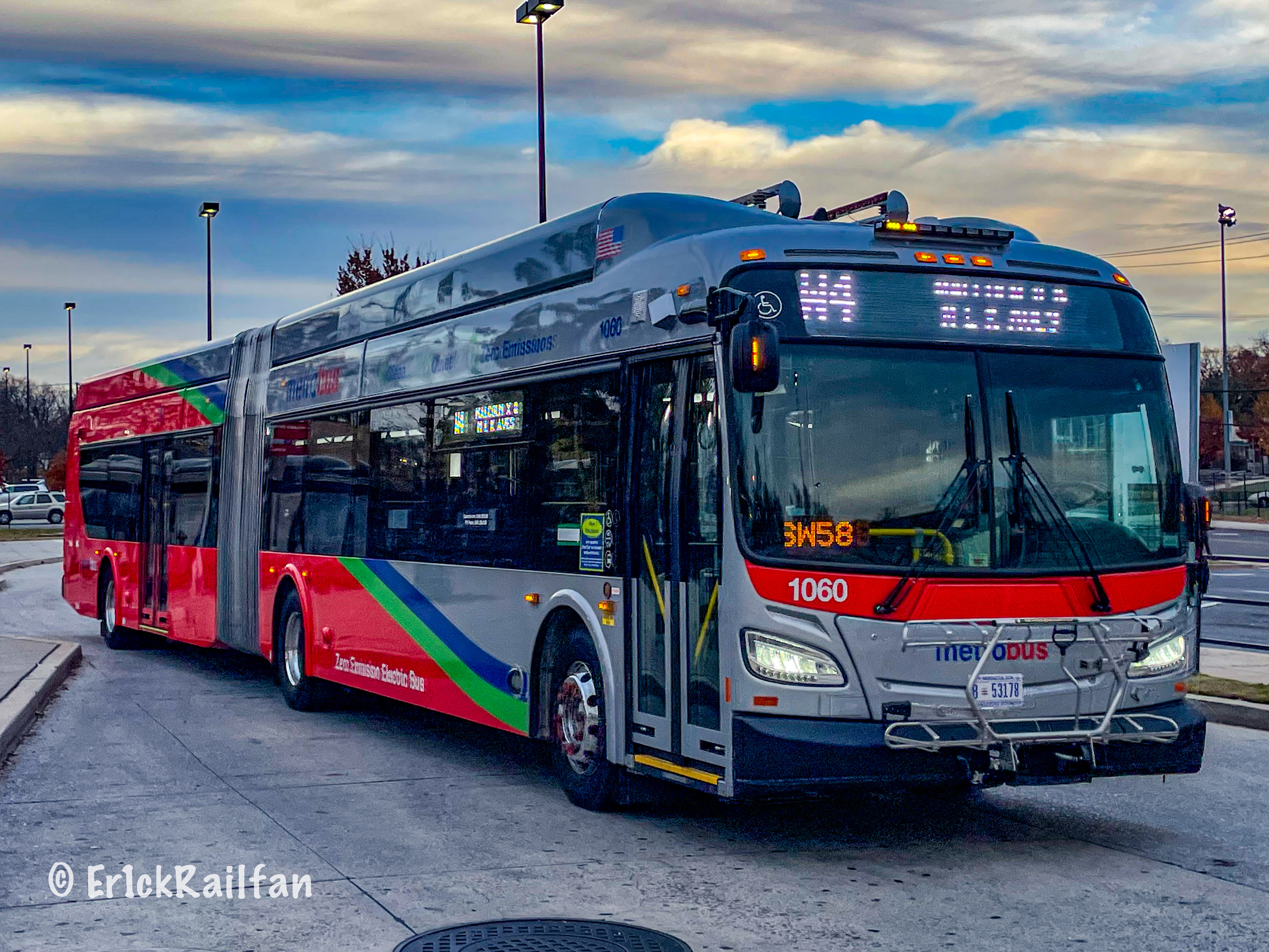
Former Route W4 at Deanwood station

=== Route U8 ===
Route U8 originally operated as a different route but was replaced by an extended route V4 when the Orange Line began operation.

The U8 was created on December 28, 1991, as the Capitol Heights–Benning Heights Line The new U8 replace the segment of the X2's original routing, as well as routes X4 and X6 between the Minnesota Avenue station & Capitol Heights stations, via Minnesota Avenue NE, Nannie Helen Burroughs Avenue NE, 58th Street NE, Dix Street NE, Eastern Avenue NE, 63rd Street NE, Southern Avenue NE/SE, and Davey Street. Routes X4 and X6 was fully discontinued and route X2 was shorten to operate between Lafayette Square to Minnesota Avenue station.

Route U8 would also operate through an additional loop between Minnesota Avenue station & Benning Heights, via Minnesota Avenue NE, Benning Road NE/SE, E Street SE, Alabama Avenue SE, H Street SE, Benning Road SE/NE, & Minnesota Avenue NE, as a loop before returning Northbound. It would be only during the loop between the Minnesota Avenue station & Benning Heights, which the U8 would serve Benning Road station and would not serve the station when operating between the Minnesota Avenue & Capitol Heights. Its order of terminus goes as follows: Capitol Heights to Minnesota Avenue then Minnesota Avenue to Benning Heights, then reverse.

=== Route V7, V8, V9 ===
Routes V7, V8, and V9 operated as part of the Minnesota Avenue-M Street Line. Route V7 operated between Deanwood station and the Bureau of Engraving operating daily with some late night trips terminating at Navy Yard–Ballpark station, route V8 only operated on weekends running between Archives station (9th St & Constitution Ave NW) and Deanwood station, and route V9 only operated during weekday peak-hour periods between Benning Heights (H St & 45th Pl SE) and Navy Yard-Ballpark station.

=== Route W4 ===
Route W4 originally operated on portions of former streetcars lines before becoming taken over buses in the 1950s to 1960s under the Capital Traction Company under streetcars lines and later became a bus line on December 23, 1924. The line then was operated under DC Transit and then WMATA when it acquired DC Transit in 1973.

Route W4 originally operated between Capital Plaza Mall in Landover Hills, Maryland and Bolling Air Force Base via Craftsman Circle and Prince George's Plaza Hospital. The line mostly operated along Division Avenue NE, Benning Road SE, Alabama Avenue SE, Kenilworth Avenue, and Baltimore–Washington Parkway. Off peak service would terminate along Kenilworth Avenue.

=== Change History ===
On December 3, 1978, route W4 was rerouted to Deanwood station via Minnesota Avenue in the middle of its route shortly after the Orange Line began service. The line would terminate at Deanwood station during the off peak-hours and would serve Capital Plaza during the weekday peak-hours only.

On January 13, 2001, route W4 was rerouted along Alabama Avenue to serve the new Congress Heights station. Alternative service to 11th Place and Congress Street is available on the W2 and W3.

Due to security concerns at Bolling Air Force Base, Route W4 could not enter the base beginning on March 21, 2003. The route would have to be rerouted South Capitol Street between Firth Sterling Avenue and Malcolm X Avenue. Passengers will be able to alight at stops on South Capitol Street at the Navy′s Firth Sterling Gate, walk through the security checkpoint, and access an internal military shuttle bus which will follow the W9 routing around the base to reach destinations within Bolling Air Force Base and the Navy′s Anacostia Annex. As a result on June 29, 2003, Route W4 was rerouted from Bolling Air Force Base to Anacostia station.

In 2011, WMATA proposed to eliminate route W4's routing between Deanwood station and Capital Plaza Mall. This was because route W4 was suffering from low ridership with large Portion of the Line in Maryland runs on Congested Roadways, impacting on-time performances with extended run times in Maryland that creates scheduling inflexibility in DC, where overwhelming majority of boardings occur. It was also proposed to improve the frequency of buses during all hours of the day.

It was proposed to extend either routes F1, F2, or F13 from Prince George's Hospital to Deanwood station discontinuing service to Cheverly station.

On March 24, 2013, W4 service between Deanwood station and Capital Plaza Mall via Craftsman Circle and Prince George's Hospital was discontinued due to low ridership and to improve on time performance. Alternative service was provided by routes A12, F1, F2, F8, F13, R11, R12, V7, V8, V14, and V15. There was no alternative service to Craftmans Circle however.

During WMATA's FY2015 budget, a study was announced on the U and V lines from Minnesota Avenue station. For route U8, it goes as the following:

- Route U8 would no longer serve the portion of the current route between Capitol Heights station and Minnesota Avenue station, which would be replaced by Routes U2 and V7.
- Route U8: Daily service at all times via the portion of the current route between Minnesota Avenue station and Benning Heights, with some trips extended to Congress Heights station via Alabama Avenue.
- Route U8 would no longer serve the portion of the current route between Capitol Heights station and Minnesota Avenue station.
- The portion of the current U8 between Capitol Heights station and Minnesota Avenue station via Nannie Helen Burroughs Avenue would be served by proposed changes to Routes U2 and V7, V8.
- Routes V7, V8: Daily service at all times between Capitol Heights station and Navy Yard–Ballpark station via the current U8 route between Capitol Heights station and Minnesota Avenue station, then via the current V7 route to Navy Yard Ballpark station.
- Route V9: Peak period service between Benning Heights and Bureau of Engraving via the current V9 route between Benning Heights and Navy Yard Ballpark station, then via the current V7 route to Bureau of Engraving.
- Routes V7 and V8 would no longer serve the portion of the current routes between Deanwood Station and Minnesota Avenue Station, which would be replaced by proposed route U4 reroute.

The rerouting was to improve reliability of service by operating shorter routes and create a better balance of capacity and demand throughout the line. Performance measures has an on-time performance is 72 percent compared to the target of 81 percent for route U8. For routes V7, V8, and V9, the reason was for enhance connectivity between points of regional demand, create a better balance of capacity and demand lines serving the Minnesota Avenue station, and reduce or eliminate service with low productivity. Approximately 700 of 5,300 (13%) weekday passenger trips, 750 of 3,200 (23%) Saturday passenger trips and 600 of 2,900 (21%) Sunday passenger trips would possibly be affected by shortening routes V7 and V8 at Navy Yard Station. Weekday passengers affected may be less due to the proposed extension of route V9.

On June 21, 2015, route U8 was shorten to only operate between the Minnesota Avenue station & Benning Heights (H Street SE & Benning Road SE) only. The segment of U8's routing between the Minnesota Avenue & Capitol Heights station was discontinued, was replaced by brand new routes V2 & V4, As a result of the change, U8 was renamed the Benning Heights Line. Also, routes V7 and V8 were replaced by routes V2 and V4 while route V9 was renamed route V1.

During WMATA Fiscal Year of 2018 budget, it was proposed to extend every other U8 weekday peak-hour trip to Congress Heights station via Benning Road and Alabama Avenue SE skipping the Benning Heights loop in order to relieve Route W4 overcrowding and respond to customer demand on portions of Alabama Avenue SE and Benning Road. The combined weekday rush hour frequency of routes U8 and W4 between East Capitol Street & Benning Road and Congress Heights would be improved from every 12–15 minutes to every 7–8 minutes in response to customer demand and crowding. The performance measures goes as follows:

Performance Measure	Route U8	WMATA Guideline	Pass/Fail
Average Weekday Riders	2487	432	Pass
Cost Recovery	21%	16.6%	Pass
Subsidy per Rider	$2.09	$4.81	Pass
Riders per Trip	12	10.7	Pass
Riders per Revenue Mile	5.8	1.3	Pass

If the proposal goes through, it will be implemented as soon as December 2017.

On June 24, 2018, route U8 was renamed route V8 which will operate on the U8's current routing between Minnesota Avenue station and Benning Heights at all times. Also, a new route V7 was created to operate between Minnesota Avenue station and Congress Heights station during weekday peak-hours only to help out route W4. The line was then renamed to the Benning Heights–Alabama Avenue Line as of result to the new routing.

In 2019 as part of WMATA's FY2021 budget, it was proposed to reroute the W4 to Fort Drum and D.C. Village in order to discontinue the A4 and W5, Service to Anacostia station would be discontinued with alternative service will be provided on routes A2, A6, A7, A8, A9, and W2. Fort Drum and DC Village residents would lose direct service to Anacostia station if the proposal goes through. However WMATA later backed out the proposal on March 31, 2020.

During the COVID-19 pandemic, all route V7 service was suspended, and routes V8 and W4 were reduced to its Saturday supplemental schedule on March 16, 2020. However beginning on March 18, 2020, routes V8 and W4 were further reduced to operate on its Sunday schedule. Weekend service was also suspended on the V8 while W4 weekend service was later further reduce to operate every 30 minutes beginning on March 21, 2020. On August 23, 2020, Route W4 regular service was restored while additional service was added to the V8 while also resuming weekend service but route V7 remained suspended.

On September 26, 2020, WMATA proposed to eliminate all route V7 service due to low federal funding and replace them with route V8 trips. Route V7 has not operated since March 13, 2020 due to Metro's response to the COVID-19 pandemic.

Later in February 2021 during WMATA's FY2022 budget crisis, WMATA proposed to add late-night service to 2:00 AM on Route W4 beginning in July 2021. However beginning in January 2022, WMATA proposed to eliminate the V7 and V8 service. Route W4 was also proposed to be rerouted from Anacostia station to Fort Drum and D.C. Village to replace the A4 and W5 via the W4 routing between Benning Road station & Martin Luther King, Jr. Avenue SE, then would operate along 4th Street, Savannah Street, 6th Street, Mississippi Avenue, Atlantic Street, Martin Luther King Jr. Avenue SW and continue on the current A4 route to Fort Drum (Irvington & Joliet streets SW) and DC Village. Service to Anacostia would be replaced a modified by Route A8. Service would also be rerouted from Deanwood station to Minnesota Avenue station with Route 96 being modified to replace the W4. Also service after midnight would be eliminated. Subsequently on April 22, 2021, WMATA approved the FY2022 budget and received federal funding to avoid service cuts.

On March 14, 2021, all route V7 service was restored and route V8 service was restored to its pre-pandemic schedule.

On June 6, 2021, late-night service was increased to operate up to 2:00 AM on Route W4.

On June 10, 2021, WMATA proposed to increase the W4 to operate every 12 minutes daily between 7:00 AM to 9:00 PM daily as part of WMATA's Pandemic Recovery Plan. On September 5, 2021, W4 service was also increased to operate every 12 minutes daily between 7 a.m. to 9 p.m.

Due to rising cases of the COVID-19 Omicron variant, Route V7 was temporarily suspended and Routes V8 and W4 were reduced to its Saturday service on weekdays. Full weekday service and all Route V7 service resumed on February 7, 2022.

On December 17, 2023, new 24 hour service was added to Route W4.

In 2024 during WMATA's FY2024 Budget crisis, WMATA proposed to eliminate all V7 service. However on April 25, 2024, Metro’s Board of Directors approved a $4.8 billion capital and operating budget which avoided service cuts.

=== Better Bus Redesign ===
In 2022, WMATA launched its Better Bus Redesign project, which aimed to redesign the entire Metrobus Network and is the first full redesign of the agency's bus network in its history.

In April 2023, WMATA launched its Draft Visionary Network. As part of the drafts, WMATA proposed to have the V7 be the main line to operate along Alabama Avenue Line as Route DC118. The route would operate the current V7 routing between Minnesota Avenue station and Congress Heights station, but would be extended to Anacostia station via the W4's routing between Congress Heights and Anacostia stations via Malcolm X Avenue SE, South Capitol Street and Firth Sterling Avenue SE, while skipping the Congress Heights station bus loop. Another Route, DC222 would be similar to Route W4, operating between Deanwood station and Anacostia station via 49th Street NE, Texas Avenue SE, Alabama Avenue SE, Suitland Road SE, Marion Barry Avenue SE, W Street SE, and Martin Luther King Jr. Avenue SE. The W4 portion between Deanwood station and Benning Road station would be taken over by the proposed Route DC115 between Washington Union Station and Deanwood station. Route V8 would be incorporated into Routes V7 and W4 as a result of the proposed changes.

During WMATA's Revised Draft Visionary Network, WMATA renamed the DC118 to Route C21 and kept the same routing. Route DC222 was renamed to Route C23 and also kept majority of the routing the same, except the route would no longer operate along 49th Street NE, and instead operate on the current W4 routing between Deanwood station and Benning Road station via Eastern Avenue, Division Avenue and East Capitol Street. All changes were then proposed during WMATA's 2025 Proposed Network.

On November 21, 2024, WMATA approved its Better Bus Redesign Network.

Beginning on June 29, 2025, Route V7 was renamed into the C21 (taking the name from the former Central Avenue Line) and was extended to Anacostia station via Malcolm X Avenue, South Capitol Street, and Firth Sterling Avenue SE, partially merging with the W4. The line gained daily service and operated every 12 minutes daily, replacing the W4. The W4 routing between Deanwood station and Benning Road station remained the same, however the line was then changed to operate along Texas Avenue SE, then operate along Alabama Avenue SE and 38th Street SE, replacing the M6 and V8, before turning onto Marion Barry Avenue SE, replacing the W6/W8, and running to Anacostia station. The route was also renamed into the C23. Route V8 was discontinued with the route being incorporated into Routes C21 and C23.
