= Sheriff Road Line =

Bus route in Washington, D.C.

C33
- Sheriff Road Line

Overview
- System: Metrobus
- Operator: Washington Metropolitan Area Transit Authority
- Garage: Bladensburg
- Livery: Local
- Status: In Service
- Began service: 1949
- Predecessors: U4

Route
- Locale: Northeast
- Communities served: Central Northeast, Deanwood, River Terrace
- Landmarks served: Minnesota Avenue station, River Terrace, Sheriff Road
- Start: Minnesota Avenue station
- Via: Sheriff Road NE, Minnesota Avenue NE, Benning Road NE
- End: Lee Street & Eastern Avenue NE (Sheriff Road); 33rd & Blaine Streets NE (River Terrace)
- Length: 25-30 minutes

Service
- Level: Daily
- Frequency: 20 minutes (Weekday peak hours); 30-35 minutes (Off-peak hours)
- Operates: 4:45 AM – 12:26 AM
- Ridership: 254,127 (FY 2025)
- Transfers: SmarTrip only
- Timetable: Sheriff Road-River Terrace Line

The Sheriff Road Line, designated as Route C33, is a daily bus route operated by the Washington Metropolitan Area Transit Authority (WMATA) between Minnesota Avenue station of the Orange and Silver Lines of the Washington Metro and Lee Street & Eastern Avenue (Sheriff Road) or 33rd Street & Blaine Street NE (River Terrace). Route C33 operates every 20 minutes during peak hours, and 30–35 minutes at all other times. Route C33 trips roughly take 30 minutes to complete.

== Background ==
Route C33 provides daily service between Minnesota Avenue station and Eastern Avenue NE & Chapelwood Lane (Sheriff Road) or 33rd Street NE & Blaine Street NE (River Terrace). Because the C33 route was a short Metrobus route with low passenger demand, C33 had almost always been assigned the smaller sized 30-foot buses, as route U4, as opposed to the regular 40-foot sized buses WMATA typically uses on many of its Metrobus routes. However, route C33 occasionally used 40-foot buses if the 30-foot buses were undergoing maintenance. As of the Better Bus Redesign rollout on June 29, 2025, Route C33 operates entirely with the 40-foot buses.

Route C33 operates out of Bladensburg division.

== History ==
Before WMATA implemented the Better Bus Redesign network, Route C33 was known as Route U4. U4 originally operated as part of the "Sheriff Road-River Terrace" streetcar line, between the Deanwood & River Terrace neighborhoods of Northeast Washington D.C. The U4 streetcar line was later replaced by buses during the 1950s and eventually became a WMATA Metrobus Route on February 4, 1973 when WMATA acquired all four bus companies that operated throughout the Washington D.C. Metropolitan Area and merged them to form its "Metrobus" System. U4 kept operating on the same exact streetcar routing it had been operating on since 1949, even after becoming a WMATA Metrobus Route.

On December 3, 1978, U4 went through a minor rerouting change to divert into/serve the newly opened Minnesota Avenue station. The rest of U4's routing remained the exact same. The line was named the Minnesota Avenue Shuttle.

On January 22, 1984, route U4 was rerouted to operate between Sheriff Road and Capitol View passing Minnesota Avenue station in both directions.

In 2014, WMATA announced a series of proposals for route U4 that would be implemented in June 2015 if they were approved by the Metro Board. The proposals included the following:

- Route U4 would operate as a daily service at all times between River Terrace and Deanwood Station via the current route between River Terrace and Minnesota Avenue station, then via the current route of V7 and V8 from Minnesota Avenue Station to Deanwood station.
- Route U4 would no longer serve the portion of the current route between Minnesota Avenue Station and Sheriff Road.
- New Route U7 would serve the portion of the current route between Minnesota Avenue Station and Sheriff Road.

This rerouting was intended to create a better balance of capacity and demand on lines serving the Minnesota Avenue station.

During the COVID-19 pandemic, Route U4 was reduced to operate on its Saturday supplemental schedule during the weekdays beginning on March 16, 2020. On March 18, 2020, the line was further reduced to operate on its Sunday schedule. Weekend service was later suspended on March 21, 2020. Additional service and all weekend service was restored on August 23, 2020.

In February 2021, during WMATA's FY2022 budget crisis, WMATA proposed eliminating the U4 if it did not receive any federal funding beginning in January 2022. Subsequently, on April 22, 2021, WMATA approved the FY2022 budget and received federal funding to avoid service cuts.

On June 10, 2021, WMATA proposed restoring Route U4's pre-pandemic service as part of WMATA's Pandemic Recovery Plan. On September 5, 2021, the line restored its pre-pandemic service.

Due to rising cases of the COVID-19 Omicron variant, the line was reduced to its Saturday service on weekdays. Full weekday service resumed on February 7, 2022.

In 2024, during WMATA's FY2024 Budget crisis, WMATA proposed eliminating all U4 service. However, on April 25, 2024, Metro’s Board of Directors approved a $4.8 billion capital and operating budget, which avoided service cuts.

=== Better Bus Redesign ===
In 2022, WMATA launched its Better Bus Redesign project, which aimed to redesign the entire Metrobus Network and was the first full redesign of the agency's bus network in its history.

In April 2023, WMATA launched its Draft Visionary Network. As part of the drafts, WMATA proposed to extend the U4 from its Eastern Avenue terminus to Deanwood station via Eastern Avenue NE, and Minnesota Avenue NE. The route would be named Route DC116 in the drafts.

During WMATA's Revised Draft Visionary Network, WMATA renamed the DC116 to Route C33 and maintained the proposed routing. All changes were then proposed during WMATA's 2025 Proposed Network.

During the proposals, WMATA instead shorten the C33 to terminate along Eastern Avenue NE instead of it being extended to Deanwood station, replicating the current U4 routing.

On November 21, 2024, WMATA approved its Better Bus Redesign Network, with service on the Sheriff Road Line being simplified.

Beginning on June 29, 2025, the U4 was renamed into the C33, keeping its same routing.

== Incidents ==
- On September 5, 2017, a passenger was arrested after he spat on a U4 bus driver along Minnesota Avenue. The driver was taken to a hospital.
