= Minnesota Avenue Line =

C31
- Minnesota Avenue Line

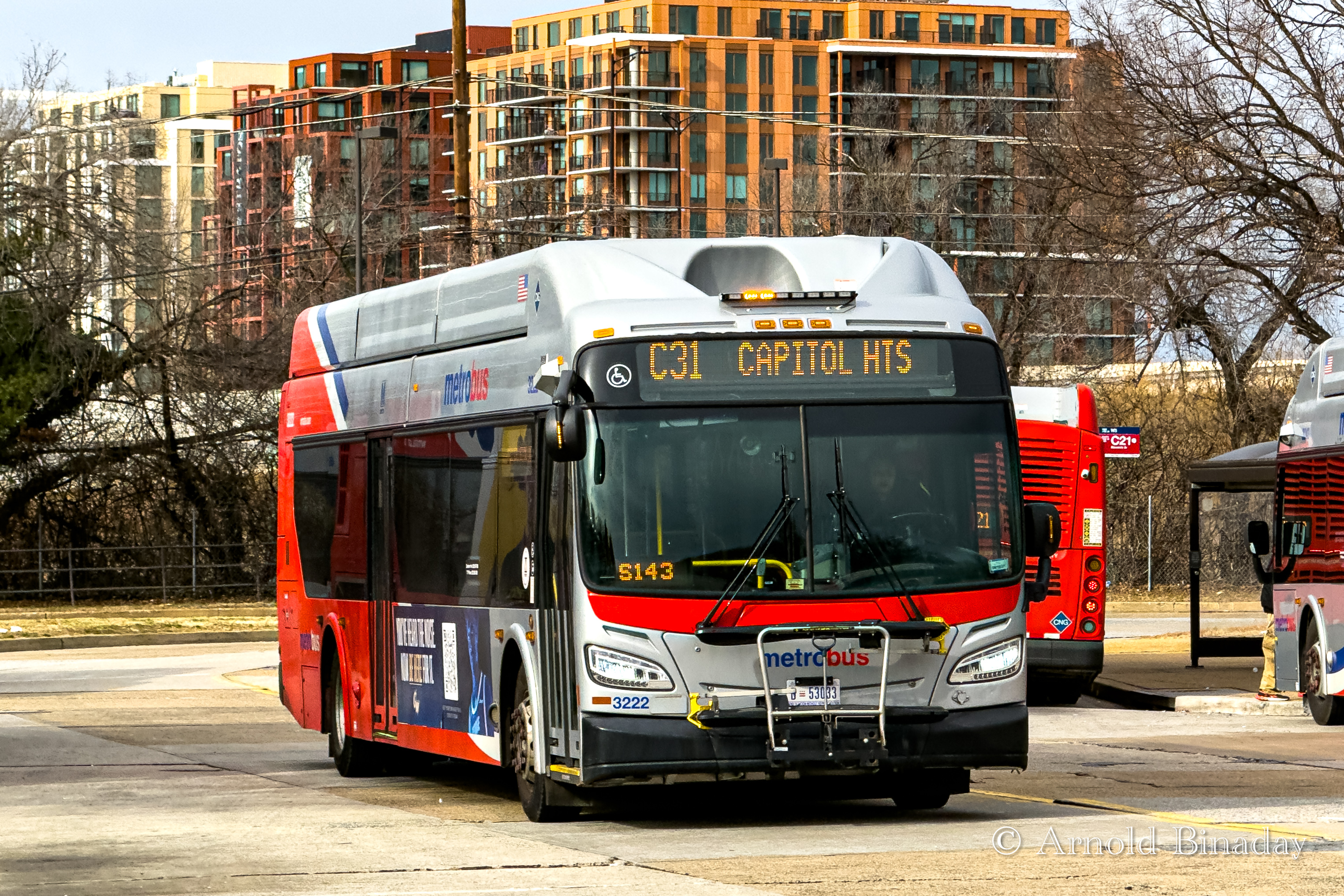
- Route C31 at Anacostia station

Overview
- System: Metrobus
- Operator: Washington Metropolitan Area Transit Authority
- Garage: Shepherd Parkway
- Livery: Local
- Status: Active
- Predecessors: U2, U8, V2, V4, V7, V8

Route
- Locale: Northeast, Southeast, Prince George's County
- Communities served: Capitol Heights, Benning Heights, Greenway, Fairlawn, Anacostia, Navy Yard
- Landmarks served: Minnesota Avenue station, Randle Circle, Frederick Douglass National Historic Site, Anacostia station, Nationals Park, Audi Field
- Start: Capitol Heights station
- Via: Nannie Helen Burroughs Avenue NE, Minnesota Avenue NE/SE, Martin Luther King Jr. Avenue SE, South Capitol Street
- End: Navy Yard–Ballpark station
- Length: 60 minutes

Service
- Frequency: 8 - 12 minutes (6:00 AM – 9:00 PM); 16–20 minutes (9:00 PM - 6:00 AM)
- Operates: 24 Hours
- Ridership: 1,644,983 (V2, FY 2025); 1,284,367 (V4, FY 2025)
- Transfers: SmarTrip only
- Timetable: Minnesota Ave Line

The Minnesota Avenue Line, designated Route C31, is a daily bus route operated by the Washington Metropolitan Area Transit Authority between Capitol Heights station of the Blue and Silver Lines of the Washington Metro and Navy Yard–Ballpark station of the Green Line of the Washington Metro. The line runs every 8–12 minutes during the day and 16–20 minutes during late nights. Trips takes roughly 60 minutes to complete.

== Background ==
Route C31 provides service between Capitol Heights station and Navy Yard–Ballpark station. This route connects Northeast residents to Southeast from Benning Heights. Route C31 operates out of Shepard Parkway.

== History ==
Routes V2 originally operated by the Washington Railway & Electric Company under the Capitol Heights–Anacostia Line running between Capitol Heights and Anacostia. Route V4 also operated under the Washington Railway & Electric Company under the Capitol Heights-Navy Yard Line between Capitol Heights and Navy Yard. Both lines would later be acquired by Capital Traction Company and were converted into buses on May 1, 1949. Both lines were later acquired by WMATA on February 4, 1973.

V2 had a prior incarnation as the 4th Street Line under the Washington Railway & Electric Company but was later replaced by the M2. V4 also had a prior incarnation as the S. Washington-Ridge Rd. under the Capital Traction Company but was later consolidated.

V6 was discontinued and replaced by the V4 on January 22, 1984.

Route V4 originally operated until the 1990s when they were replaced by the Minnesota Ave-M St Line on December 28, 1991.

=== Route U2 ===
Route U2 originally operated as the Benning-Kenilworth Line under the Washington Railway & Electric Company before being renamed into the V8.

Route U2 originally operated into Maryland but was discontinued on December 3, 1978, and replaced by routes F14 and P12. Route U2 would operate as the Deanwood–Minnesota Avenue Line between the Deanwood station & Benning Heights (Hanna Place SE & Benning Road SE), via the Minnesota Avenue Metro Station, and then via Minnesota Avenue NE, Eastern Avenue NE, Kenilworth Avenue NE, Deane Avenue NE, Minnesota Avenue NE/SE, Ridge Road SE, Anacostia Road SE, B Street SE, Texas Avenue SE, E Street SE, Alabama Avenue SE, H Street SE, Benning Road SE, Hanna Place SE, and H Street SE.

==== Changes ====
On December 28, 1991, when Anacostia station opened, U2 was rerouted to operate between the Minnesota Avenue station and Anacostia station via Minnesota Avenue NE/SE, Good Hope Road SE, 16th Street SE (to the Minnesota Avenue), W Street SE (Minnesota Avenue), Martin Luther King Jr. Avenue SE, and Howard Road SE, instead of operating between Deanwood station & Benning Heights.

Route U2's routing between the Deanwood and Minnesota Avenue stations, was replaced by the brand new Minnesota Avenue–M Street Line, or V7, V8, and V9. U2's routing between the intersection of Anacostia Road SE & Minnesota Avenue SE and Hanna Place SE & Benning Road SE, via Minnesota Avenue SE, Ridge Road SE, Anacostia Road SE, B Street SE, Texas Avenue SE, E Street SE, Alabama Avenue SE, H Street SE, Benning Road SE, Hanna Place SE, and H Street SE to its Benning Heights terminus at the intersection of Hanna Place SE & Benning Road SE, was replaced by route V9.

On December 18, 2011, new Saturday service was added to the U2 running every 30 minutes between 6:45 AM to 9:45 PM.

==== 2014 Study ====
During WMATA's Fiscal Year of 2015, they announced a series of proposals of simplification affecting the current routes U2, U4, U5, U6, U8, V7, V8, and V9.

At the time of the proposals, the routes were suffering from on-time performances, and several bus bunching on the routes. Route U2 will have daily service at all times between Capitol Heights station and Anacostia station via the current U8 route between Capitol Heights station and Minnesota Avenue station via Nannie Helen Burroughs Avenue, then via the current U2 route to Anacostia station.

- Route U2 will have daily service at all times between Capitol Heights station and Anacostia station via the current U8 route between Capitol Heights station and Minnesota Avenue station via Nannie Helen Burroughs Avenue, then via the current U2 route to Anacostia station.
- Routes V7, V8: Daily service at all times between Capitol Heights station and Navy Yard–Ballpark station via the current U8 route between Capitol Heights station and Minnesota Avenue station, then via the current V7 route to Navy Yard Ballpark station.
- Route V9: Peak period service between Benning Heights and Bureau of Engraving via the current V9 route between Benning Heights and Navy Yard Ballpark station, then via the current V7 route to Bureau of Engraving.
- Service between Minnesota Avenue station and Deanwood station will be replaced by an extended route U4.
- U8 service between Minnesota Avenue and Capitol Heights will be replaced by route U2.

The reason for the changes was in order to enhance connectivity between points of regional demand, create a better balance of capacity and demand lines serving the Minnesota Avenue, and to reduce/eliminate service with low productivity on the line. According to WMATA, there will be approximately 700 of 5,300 weekday passenger trips (13%), 750 of 3,200 Saturday passenger trips (23%) and 600 of 2,900 Sunday passenger trips (21%) that will be affected by shortening routes V7 and V8 at Navy Yard Station if the changes occur. Weekday passengers affected may be less due to the proposed extension of route V9.

=== Modified Route ===
On June 21, 2015, route U2 and renamed route V2 and was extended to Capitol Heights station via Nannie Helen Burroughs Avenue and follow U2's routing between Minnesota Avenue station and Anacostia station. Routes V7 and V8 were renamed route V4 which was shorten to Navy Yard–Ballpark station with service between Navy Yard and the Bureau of Engraving being replaced by route V9 which was renamed route V1. The new line will be called the Capitol Heights–Minnesota Avenue Line. Route V2 will operate Monday through Saturday with no Sunday service (the same pattern as the U2), and route V4 will operate daily (the same pattern as routes V7 and V8).

In the process of the changes, route U2, V7, V8, and V9 designation were discontinued, and route U8 was shorten to operate between Minnesota Avenue station and Benning Heights.

During the COVID-19 pandemic, Routes V2 and V4 was reduced to operate on its Saturday supplemental schedule during the weekdays beginning on March 16, 2020. On March 18, 2020, the line was further reduced to operate on its Sunday schedule with Route V2 being suspended. Weekend service for V4 was later reduced to every 30 minutes on March 21, 2020. The pre-pandemic schedule and all V2 service was restored on August 23, 2020.

In February 2021 during WMATA's FY2022 budget criss, WMATA proposed to add late-night service to 2:00 AM beginning in July 2021. However, beginning in January 2022, WMATA proposed to eliminate the V4 and give the V2 daily service to replace the V4. Subsequently on April 22, 2021, WMATA approved the FY2022 budget and received federal funding to avoid service cuts.

On June 6, 2021, late night service was added to route V2 daily, adding Sunday Service on route V2 for the first time, while route V4 was shortened late nights to 11:30 pm weekdays and 10:30 pm weekends.

On June 10, 2021, WMATA proposed to increase the V2 and V4 to operate every 12 minutes daily between 7:00 AM to 9:00 PM daily as part of WMATA's Pandemic Recovery Plan.

On September 5, 2021, both the V2 and V4 were increased to every 24 minutes with a combined 12 minutes between Capitol Heights station and Minnesota and Pennsylvania Avenues SE from 7AM to 9PM, with the V2 also getting full Sunday service.

Due to rising cases of the COVID-19 Omicron variant, the line was reduced to its Saturday service on weekdays. Full weekday service resumed on February 7, 2022.

On December 17, 2023, new 24 hour service was added to Route V2.

In 2024 during WMATA's FY2024 Budget crisis, WMATA proposed to reroute and terminate all V4 service at Potomac Avenue station Service to Navy Yard station would be eliminated. However on April 25, 2024, Metro’s Board of Directors approved a $4.8 billion capital and operating budget which avoided service cuts.

=== Better Bus Redesign ===
In 2022, WMATA launched its Better Bus Redesign project, which aimed to redesign the entire Metrobus Network and is the first full redesign of the agency's bus network in its history.

In April 2023, WMATA launched its Draft Visionary Network. As part of the drafts, WMATA proposed to combine the V2 and V4 into one route and operate it between Capitol Heights station and Navy Yard–Ballpark station via Anacostia station. The route, named Route DC117 in the drafts, would follow the current V2 routing between Capitol Heights and Anacostia stations, but would then travel along South Capitol Street SW/SE, the Frederick Douglass Memorial Bridge, and 1st Street SE before reaching Navy Yard-Ballpark station. V4 service along M Street SE, I Street SE, 8th Street SE, and 11th Street SE was to be taken over by the proposed Route DC219, which would operate between L'Enfant Plaza station and Fort Lincoln.

During WMATA's Revised Draft Visionary Network, WMATA renamed the DC117 to Route C31 and Route DC219 to Route D39 and kept their proposed routing. However the D39 was dropped from the proposed network. All changes were then proposed during WMATA's 2025 Proposed Network.

On November 21, 2024, WMATA approved its Better Bus Redesign Network.

Beginning on June 29, 2025, Routes V2 and V4 were combined into one route, being renamed into the C31. The route follows the former V2 entirely, then would operate along South Capitol Street SW/SE and end at Navy Yard–Ballpark station. Service on Pennsylvania Avenue SE, M Street SE and Potomac Avenue Station was eliminated.

== Incidents ==
- On September 18, 2016, a V4 bus collided with a van along Minnesota Avenue and Hayes Street injuring 20 people.
- On March 9, 2025, a passenger was shot onboard a V2 bus near 22nd Street and Minnesota Avenue.
