= Navy Yard =

Navy Yard may refer to:

- Boston Navy Yard, Massachusetts
- Brooklyn Navy Yard, the New York Naval Shipyard
- Cavite Navy Yard, located in Manila Bay, the Philippines
- Charleston Navy Yard, South Carolina
- Mare Island Naval Shipyard, California
- Norfolk Naval Shipyard, Virginia
- Philadelphia Naval Shipyard, Pennsylvania
- Portsmouth Naval Shipyard, Maine
- Puget Sound Naval Shipyard, Washington state
- San Francisco Naval Shipyard, California
- Washington Navy Yard, Washington, D.C.
  - Navy Yard–Ballpark station, a Metro station in Washington, D.C.
  - Navy Yard, Washington, D.C., the neighborhood around the Washington Navy Yard and served by the Metro station of the same name
