= River Terrace (Washington, D.C.) =

- Neighborhood
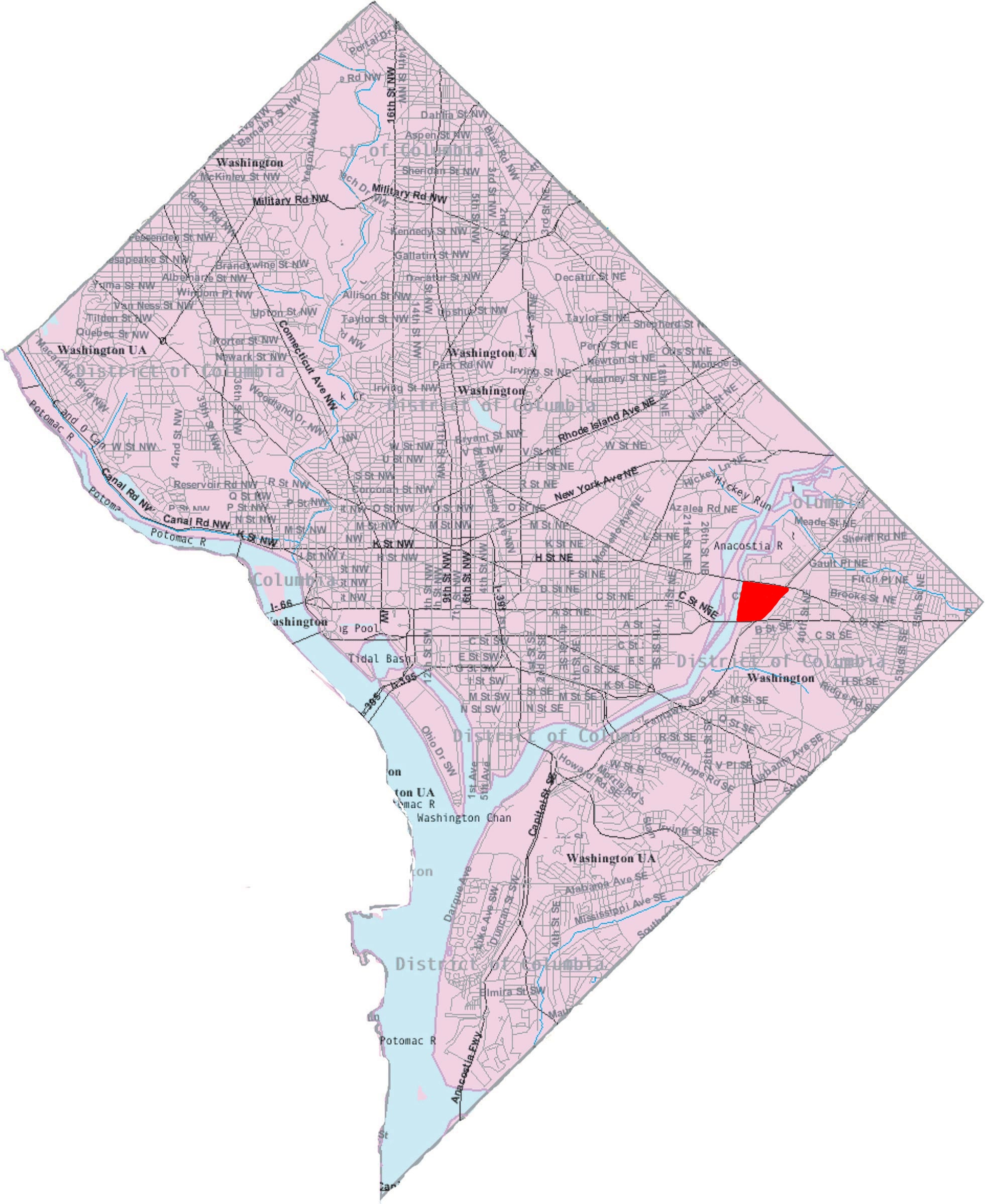
- Map of Washington, D.C., with the River Terrace neighborhood highlighted in red
- Coordinates: 38°53′36″N 076°57′29″W
- Country: United States
- District: Washington, D.C.
- Ward: Ward 7
- Constructed: 1937
- Named after: proximity to the Anacostia River

Government
  - Councilmember: Wendell Felder

River Terrace is an urban cul-de-sac neighborhood in Northeast Bounded by Anacostia Riverwalk Trail NE, East Capitol Street NE, Kenilworth Avenue NE, and Benning Road NE.Washington, D.C., on the eastern bank of the Anacostia River. River Terrace is Washington, DC's only planned unit development that has an unimpeded connection to and relationship with the Anacostia River.

The 2010 U.S. Census reported that River Terrace has a total of 1,962 residents who live in 998 households. In addition to single-family row houses and semi-detached houses, the neighborhood has about 75 rental apartments in seven low-rise multi-family buildings.

River Terrace is bounded by DC Route 295 (also known as the Anacostia Freeway) to the east; Benning Road, NE to the north; the Anacostia River to the west; and East Capitol Street to the south. In addition to the residences, the neighborhood consists of River Terrace Park (part of the National Park Service's 11-mile shoreline Anacostia Park); the River Terrace Shopping Center; the Varick Memorial African Methodist Episcopal Zion Church; a U.S. Postal Service Carrier Annex; and the River Terrace Education Campus, which opened in the fall of 2015.

== History ==
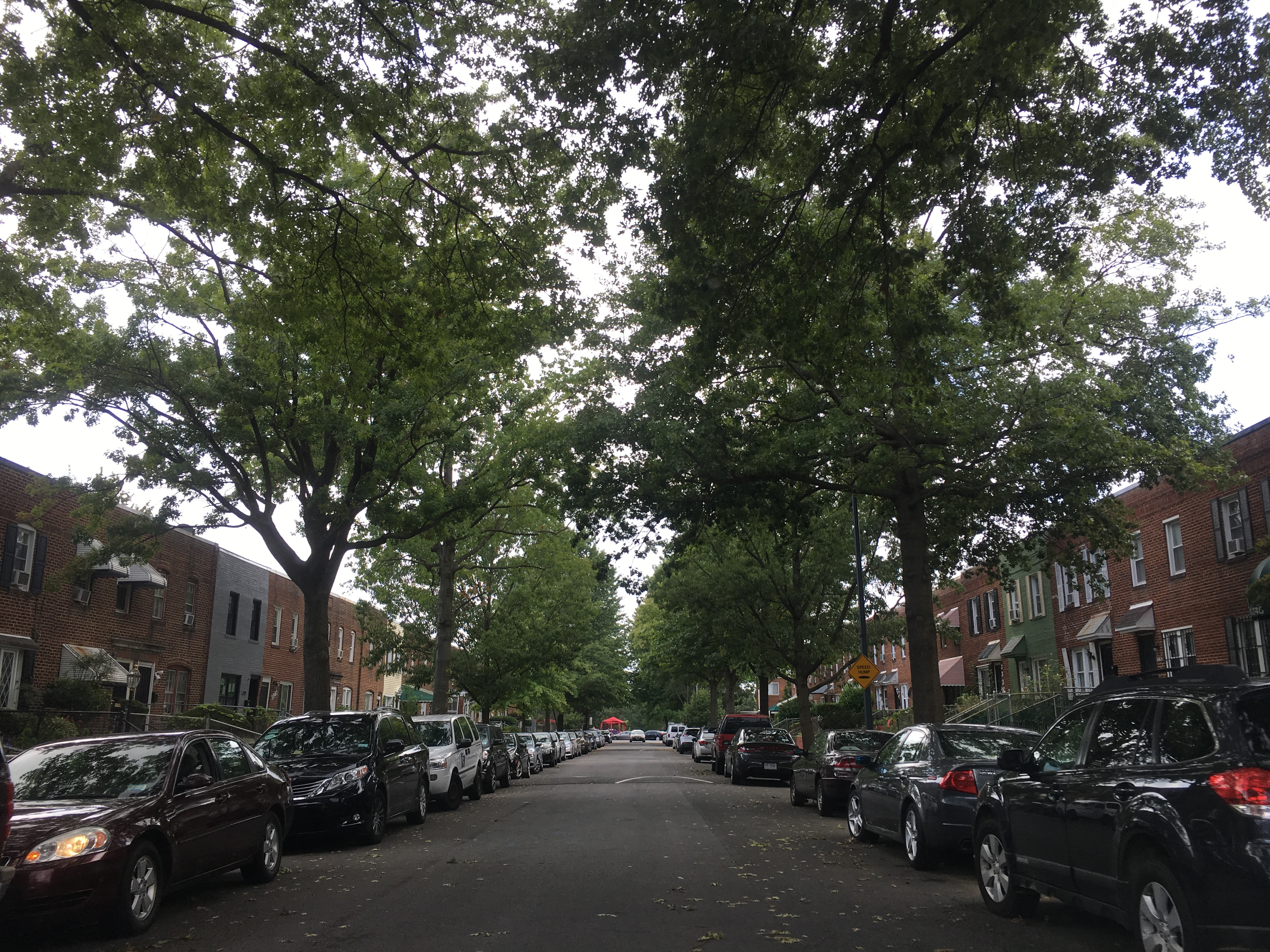
River Terrace neighborhood at the intersection of 34th St and Clay Pl NE in September 2018

National Insured Homes Corporation, a building subsidiary of N. K. Winston & Co., Inc., was the original developer of River Terrace. The Winston company was a New York-based real estate and construction firm. Successor developers included Myron Davy and Frank J. Murphy, Jr. of the River Terrace Company.

The River Terrace neighborhood began in 1937, built on 65 acres of rural, undeveloped land. The cul-de-sac neighborhood was bounded by Benning Road, NE; Anacostia Park; and the Baltimore & Ohio and Pennsylvania Railroad rights-of-way (DC Route 295 and the East Capitol Street Bridge were not yet built). The developer of River Terrace advertised it as being "eight minutes from downtown Washington, with street cars and buses close at hand." Most of the attached homes (later referred to as row houses or townhouses) were designed to sell for less than $5,000 each to working-class families.

In DC Government historical records, River Terrace is defined as part B of an area on the east side of the Anacostia River that the Government named Lily Ponds. In the 1880s, Civil War veteran Walter Shaw transplanted wild water lilies from his native Maine to a pond he created on his farmland and tidal wetlands located on the north end of the Anacostia River in Washington, DC. In 1939, the National Park Service acquired Kenilworth Aquatic Gardens, making it the only U.S. National Park devoted to aquatic plants.

=== Architecture in River Terrace ===
George Thomas Santmyers, Jr., one of Washington, DC's most prolific architects of the 20th century, designed the houses in River Terrace.

The initial two-story brick and masonry row houses were 15-feet wide on 100-feet-deep lots, and each home had two or three bedrooms. All the houses had steel casement windows and hardwood floors on the first and second floors, and many houses included a full concrete basement.

A 1937 newspaper advertisement boasted that River Terrace is a "community of modern homes specifically designed for the two- to five-member family of average means."

The same advertisement also said, "Adjoining Anacostia Park. This is a close-in [to downtown] restricted residential neighborhood." Before 1948, exclusionary covenants were legally used in the United States for segregationist purposes.

River Terrace row houses in 1937 had hip roofs, and the exterior finishes were designed to resemble those of a rustic English village. Later houses were semi-detached, flat roofed, and 20-feet wide. These houses resembled tract housing that had few architectural details, but they had large back yards.

In 1938, the 100th home in River Terrace was completed, and the Federal Housing Administration approved River Terrace homes for insured financing.

=== River Terrace grows ===
By 1940, River Terrace had more than 300 finished houses, and the developer planned to build an additional 700 houses. Also, construction was underway at the River Terrace Shopping Center, to include six stores and a group of offices.

The following year, the United States entered World War II, and the influx of defense-related employees increased the demand for housing throughout the Washington, DC area.

In 1944, the U.S. government passed the Servicemen's Readjustment Act, known informally as the G.I. Bill. The Act included numerous benefits for returning World War II veterans, including low-cost mortgages that enabled U.S. soldiers to purchase their first homes.

When the River Terrace neighborhood was built-out in 1958, it had about 1,000 single-family homes and 7 apartment buildings.

=== Exclusionary covenants ===
When home sales began in 1937, River Terrace was advertised as "a restricted residential neighborhood." The deed for each house included racially restrictive covenants that forbade the sale, lease, rental, or occupation of River Terrace homes to "negroes or any person or persons of negro blood or extraction."

In 1948, the U.S. Supreme Court ruled in Shelley v. Kraemer that exclusionary covenants are unconstitutional under the Fourteenth Amendment and are therefore legally unenforceable.

However, in April 1949, River Terrace's first black residents endured name-calling and vandalism of their property: "Two hours after a Negro family moved into a row house in a Northeast Washington white neighborhood [River Terrace], the house was stoned twice and a trash fire of undetermined origin was discovered in the back yard."

A neighbor told the new River Terrace family that Ku Klux Klan activity in the neighborhood included cross burning.

Two months later, the new family endured further hostilities: False classified advertisements were placed in three Washington newspapers, offering the home for sale and recruiting a cook-maid.

Undeterred—despite being treated as second-class citizens—black families continued to buy homes in River Terrace. By 1951, River Terrace had both "white and Negro families living in the more than 500 dwelling units there." However, the River Terrace Elementary School under construction was "authorized [in 1949] as a white school."

In Brown v. Board of Education of Topeka in 1954, the U.S. Supreme Court declared that state laws establishing separate public schools for black and white students are unconstitutional.

Eventually, all of the initial white owners in River Terrace sold their homes, and frequently at a financial loss. This social phenomenon is known as white flight.

== River Terrace Community Organization ==
In 1950, the River Terrace Community Organization (RTCO) formed to promote and protect the interests of the residents of the River Terrace neighborhood.

RTCO's founders agreed on an organizational title "that would differentiate their group from the prevailing [segregated social] system that had set up 'civic associations' as black groups and 'citizens associations' as white groups." In other words, the RTCO wanted to represent all who live in the neighborhood; the previously formed Citizens Association of River Terrace did not.

When the River Terrace Elementary School opened in 1952, the RTCO secured a permanent location for its monthly community meetings, held during the school year.

=== History of the RTCO newsletter ===
In March 1958, the RTCO published the first issue of its newsletter for River Terracers, named "On the Terrace." For each issue, a team of residents delivered the free newsletter to the door of each of the households in River Terrace.

The first newsletter had 4 pages, including a report that officers were elected and committee chairmen were selected in October 1957 for the following volunteer, one-year terms: President, Vice President, Recording Secretary, Financial Secretary, Corresponding Secretary, Treasurer, Chaplain, Sergeant-at-Arms, Reporter, Parliamentarian, Education, Legislation, Recreation and Social, Public Service, Ways and Means, Membership, and Junior Civic Association.

Subsequent issues of the newsletter included summaries of programs and activities of various committees, and articles and notes of general interest to residents.

The January 1961 issue of "On the Terrace" had 20 pages.

=== RTCO accomplishments ===
In 1958, RTCO membership dues were $1.00 per year for individuals, and $1.50 per household couple. In the 1950s, RTCO membership peaked at 724, and in 1963, RTCO had "1,000 members, the largest number ever to join in one year."

In June 1959, the RTCO won first prize—$200—in the YMCA's Northeast Spring Cleanup Campaign. The YMCA cited the RTCO for its "all-out community effort" to recruit "several hundred residents to clean up debris, seed or mow lawns, put up fences, paint houses, or [make] other improvements."

Over the decades, RTCO activities in River Terrace have included youth gardening programs, block parties, adult education classes, scout troops for boys and girls, a neighborhood-watch program, athletic teams, December holiday parties, "River Terrace Day and Parade" in June, and block captain programs. These traditions have helped make River Terrace a tight-knit village with a strong sense of community.
