= Navy Yard–Ballpark station =

Washington Metro station

Coordinates: 38.8766703°N 77.004523°W

Navy Yard–Ballpark
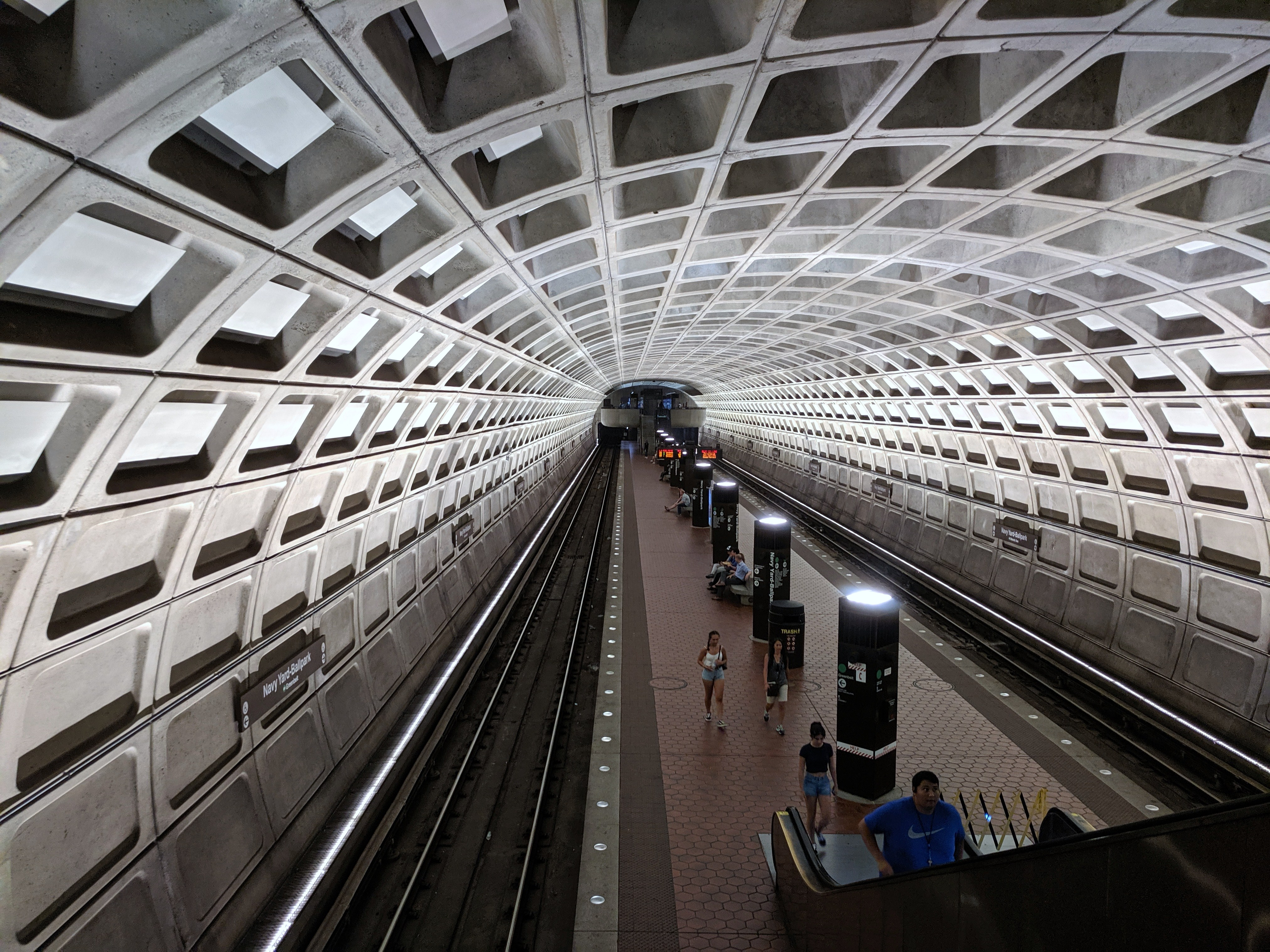
- Navy Yard–Ballpark station platform facing south in July 2019

General information
- Location: 200 M Street SE; Washington, D.C.
- Owner: Washington Metropolitan Area Transit Authority
- Platforms: 1 island platform
- Tracks: 2
- Connections: Metrobus: C11, C31, C55; MTA Maryland Commuter Bus; OmniRide Commuter

Construction
- Structure type: Underground
- Cycle facilities: Capital Bikeshare, 12 racks
- Accessible: Yes

Other information
- Station code: F05

History
- Opened: December 28, 1991; 34 years ago
- Rebuilt: 2008
- Former names: Navy Yard (1991–2011)

Passengers
- 2025: 10,400 (average weekday)
- Rank: 10 of 98

Services
Preceding station	Washington Metro	Following station
Anacostia toward Branch Avenue	Green Line	Waterfront toward Greenbelt
Route map
Location

Navy Yard–Ballpark station (also known by its former name, Navy Yard) is a Washington Metro station in Washington, D.C., on the Green Line. The station is located in the Navy Yard/Near Southeast neighborhood of Southeast, with entrances on M Street at Half Street and New Jersey Avenue.

== Station layout ==
The station uses the island platform layout with two tracks. Track F1 is used by trains to Greenbelt while Branch Avenue-bound trains use track F2.

== History ==
A station serving the Navy Yard area existed in original plans for Metro; however, the routing of the Green Line below proved controversial. In 1976, the original routing was rejected as too costly and disruptive. A new study proposed a more westerly path which would move the Anacostia station west, replace the Good Hope Road station with one at Congress Heights, and terminate at a station (named "Rosecroft" in plans and Metro maps) near Brinkley Road and Rosecroft Drive in Fort Washington instead of Branch Avenue in Suitland. During December 1977 public hearings, this route was criticized as disserving more impoverished landowners in the area, but Washington Metropolitan Area Transit Authority (WMATA) approved the western route in 1980, scheduled to open in 1986. Supporters of the Branch Avenue route then took the case to the U.S. District Court.

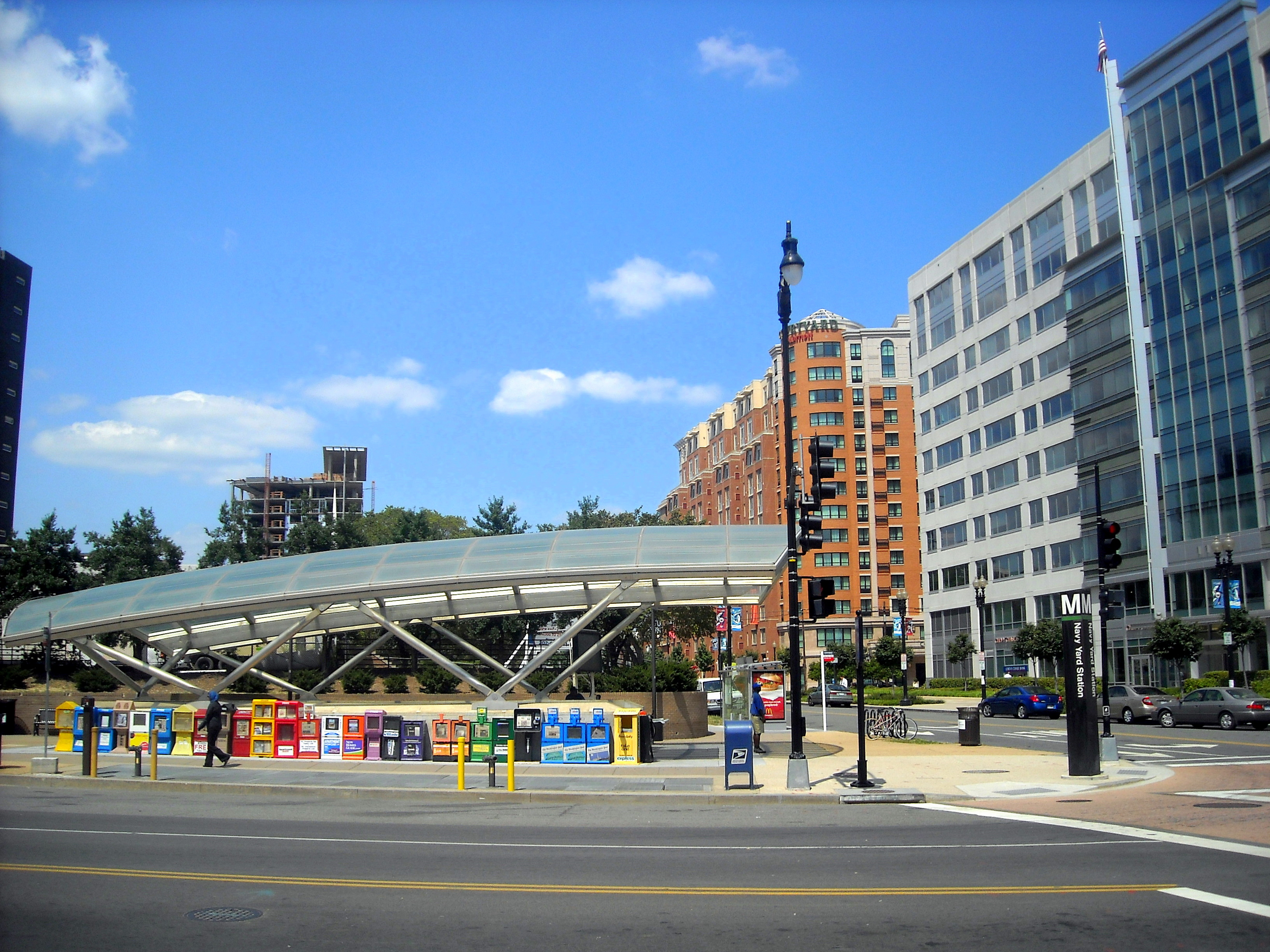
New Jersey Avenue entrance to the Navy Yard–Ballpark Metro station

The court ruled in February 1981 that the 1977 hearings were invalid, as insufficient public notice had been given. It issued an injunction halting construction below the Waterfront station. New hearings were held in June 1982, but the court again ruled against WMATA in October 1983. The third set of hearings in July 1984 selected the present route, allowing construction to commence. Service to the station began on December 28, 1991, with the extension of the Green Line to Anacostia's station.

=== New stadiums ===
Due to the construction of the Washington Nationals' new stadium and other nearby projects, the Navy Yard–Ballpark station underwent a significant expansion to serve game-day crowds and expected increase in daily traffic from new residents and workers. WMATA announced that it carried 21,492 people to the inaugural game on March 31, 2008, over half the total crowd; it was hailed as a success. Passengers exit the station near the park's center field entrance.

Audi Field, a new soccer stadium for D.C. United, was built near Nationals Park and relies on Navy Park–Ballpark station for matchday transport. The stadium has no parking, and D.C. United expects that 60 percent of ticket holders will use Metro.

=== Naming ===
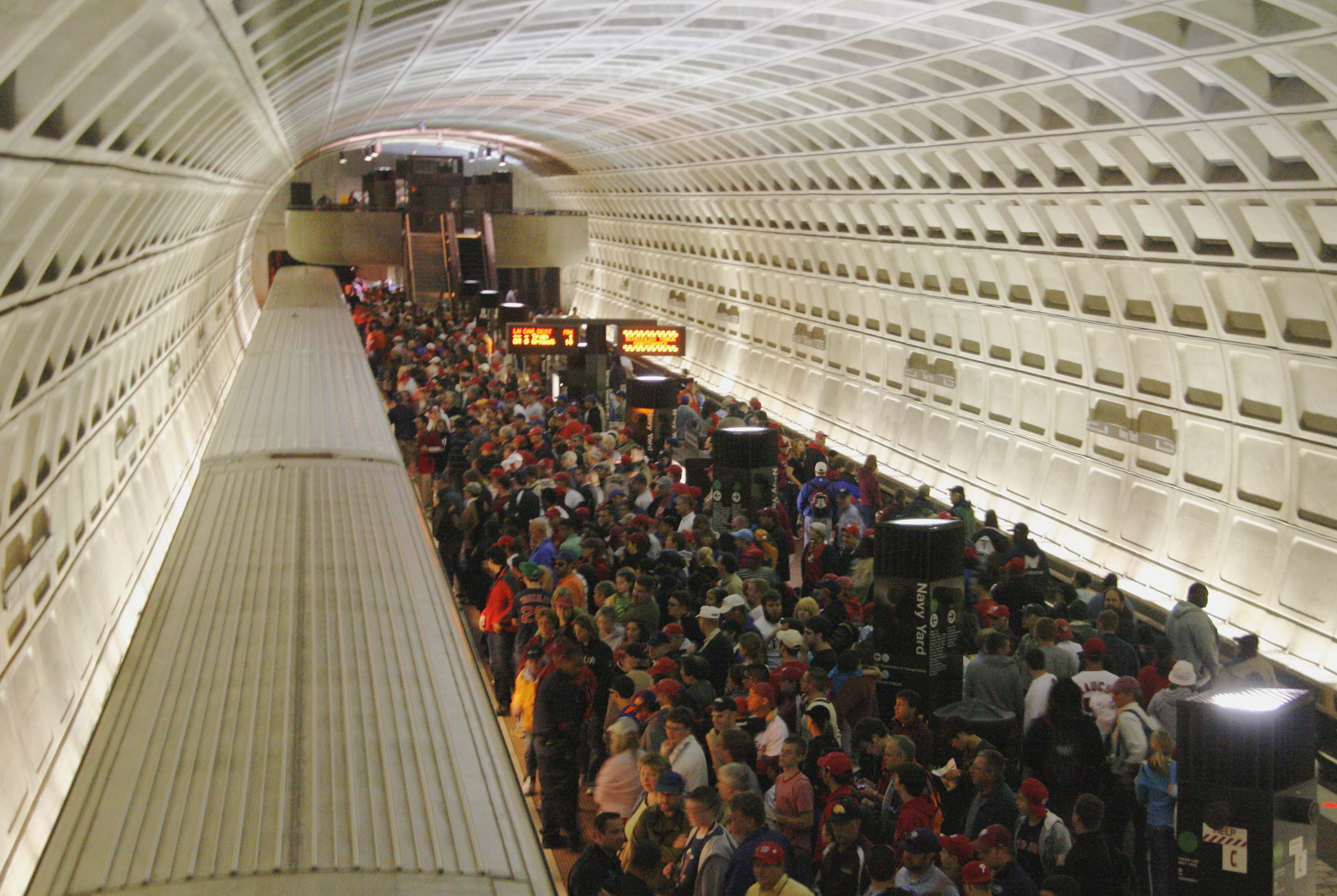
Navy Yard–Ballpark station after a Washington Nationals game in May 2009

Originally named simply Navy Yard for the nearby Washington Navy Yard, the station was renamed Navy Yard–Ballpark on November 3, 2011, reflecting the 2008 opening of Nationals Park, home of the Washington Nationals Major League Baseball team. The construction of the US Department of Transportation office complex and the $600 million Nationals Park have spurred rapid growth in the neighborhood. Most of the neighborhood's land and businesses have been purchased by companies and is currently being developed into commercial and residential projects. The area plans to contain 12 to 15 million square feet (1,100,000 to 1,400,000 m^{2}) of office space, 9,000 residential units, 1,200 hospitality rooms, 800,000 square feet (74,000 m^{2}) of retail space, four public parks, and an Anacostia Riverwalk trail system.

== Location ==
The Navy Yard area in Southeast DC has been undergoing significant development with subsequent gentrification both residentially and commercially. Nationals Park is possibly the biggest catalyst for redevelopment currently and is only located one block south of the station with easy access using the Half Street SE exit. The headquarters of the United States Department of Transportation (USDoT) are also near the station, across the street from the New Jersey Avenue, SE exit.
