= Minnesota Avenue station =

Washington Metro station

Coordinates: 38.8986°N 76.9469°W

Minnesota Avenue
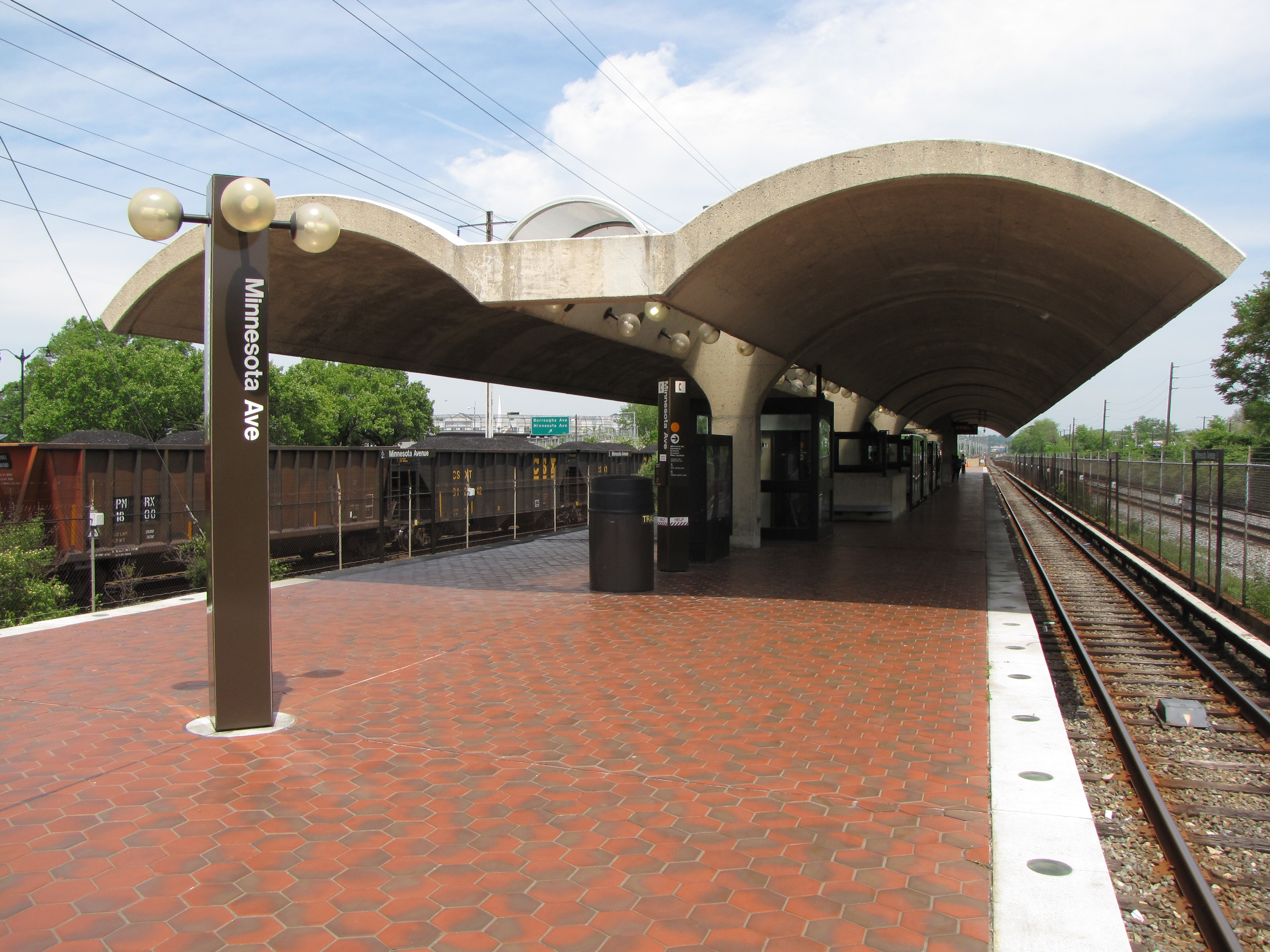
- Inbound end of the station in May 2010

General information
- Location: 4000 Minnesota Avenue NE; Washington, D.C.
- Owner: Washington Metropolitan Area Transit Authority
- Platforms: 1 island platform
- Tracks: 2
- Connections: Metrobus: C21, C31, C33, C35, C37, D20; Anacostia Riverwalk Trail

Construction
- Structure type: At-grade
- Parking: 333 spaces
- Cycle facilities: Capital Bikeshare, 8 racks and 4 lockers
- Accessible: Yes

Other information
- Station code: D09

History
- Opened: November 20, 1978; 47 years ago

Passengers
- 2025: 1,944 (average weekday)
- Rank: 79 of 98

Services
Preceding station	Washington Metro	Following station
Stadium–Armory toward Vienna	Orange Line	Deanwood toward New Carrollton
Stadium–Armory toward Ashburn	Silver Line	Deanwood toward New Carrollton
Former services
Preceding station	Washington Metro	Following station
Stadium-Armory toward Huntington	Blue Line	Deanwood toward New Carrollton
Route map
Location

Minnesota Avenue station is an island-platformed Washington Metro station in the Central Northeast/Mahaning Heights neighborhood of Northeast Washington, D.C., United States. The station was opened on November 20, 1978, and is operated by the Washington Metropolitan Area Transit Authority (WMATA), providing service for the Orange and Silver Lines.

On the Orange and Silver Line’s westbound service, Minnesota Ave is the last station before crossing the Anacostia River, as well as the last above-ground station until East Falls Church in Virginia. West of the station, trains curve over RFK Campus parking lots on elevated track before descending underground.

== Location ==
Minnesota Avenue station is located between Kenilworth Avenue and Minnesota Avenue, at Grant Street, immediately east of the CSX Landover Subdivision rail bed. The station is an east-Washington commuter station with a small parking lot and many Metrobuses serving the east side of the city from here. It is also southwest of the historic western terminus of the Chesapeake Beach Railway.

== History ==
The station opened on November 20, 1978. Its opening coincided with the completion of 7.4 miles (11.9 km) of rail northeast of the Stadium–Armory station and the opening of the Cheverly, Deanwood, Landover, and New Carrollton stations.

In May 2018, Metro announced an extensive renovation of platforms at twenty stations across the system. New Carrollton station was closed from May 28, 2022, through September 5, 2022, as part of the summer platform improvement project, which also affected the Minnesota Avenue, Deanwood, Cheverly, and Landover stations on the Orange Line. Shuttle buses and free parking were provided at the closed stations.

On September 10, 2022, Blue Line trains started serving the station due to the 14th Street bridge shutdown as a part of the Blue Plus service. The service ended on May 7, 2023 with the reopening of the Yellow Line.

Half of Silver Line trains began operating between Ashburn and New Carrollton on June 22, 2025.

== Station Layout ==
The Minnesota Avenue station consists of an at-grade island platform situated between CSX freight tracks, built on unneeded land within the existing right-of-way. The station fare gates and mezzanine exist in a basement level underneath the south end of the platform, with entrances from both sides of the right-of-way. A bus bay exists outside of the southeast exit, located between Minnesota Avenue itself and the station entrance.
