= Deanwood =

Coordinates: 38°54′10″N 76°55′54″W

- Neighborhood of Washington, D.C.
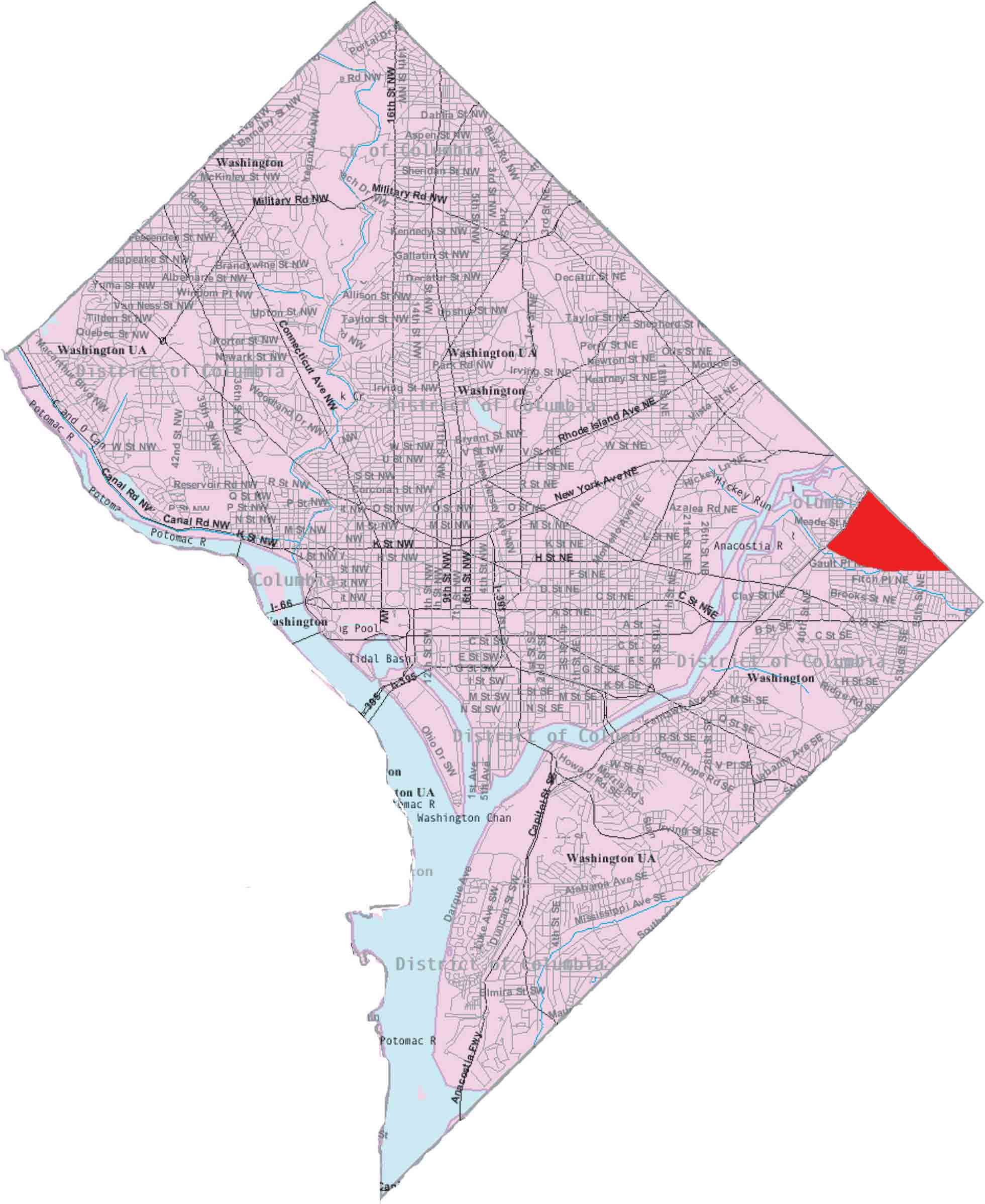
- Deanwood within the District of Columbia
- Country: United States
- District: Washington, D.C.
- Ward: Ward 7

Government
  - Councilmember: Wendell Felder

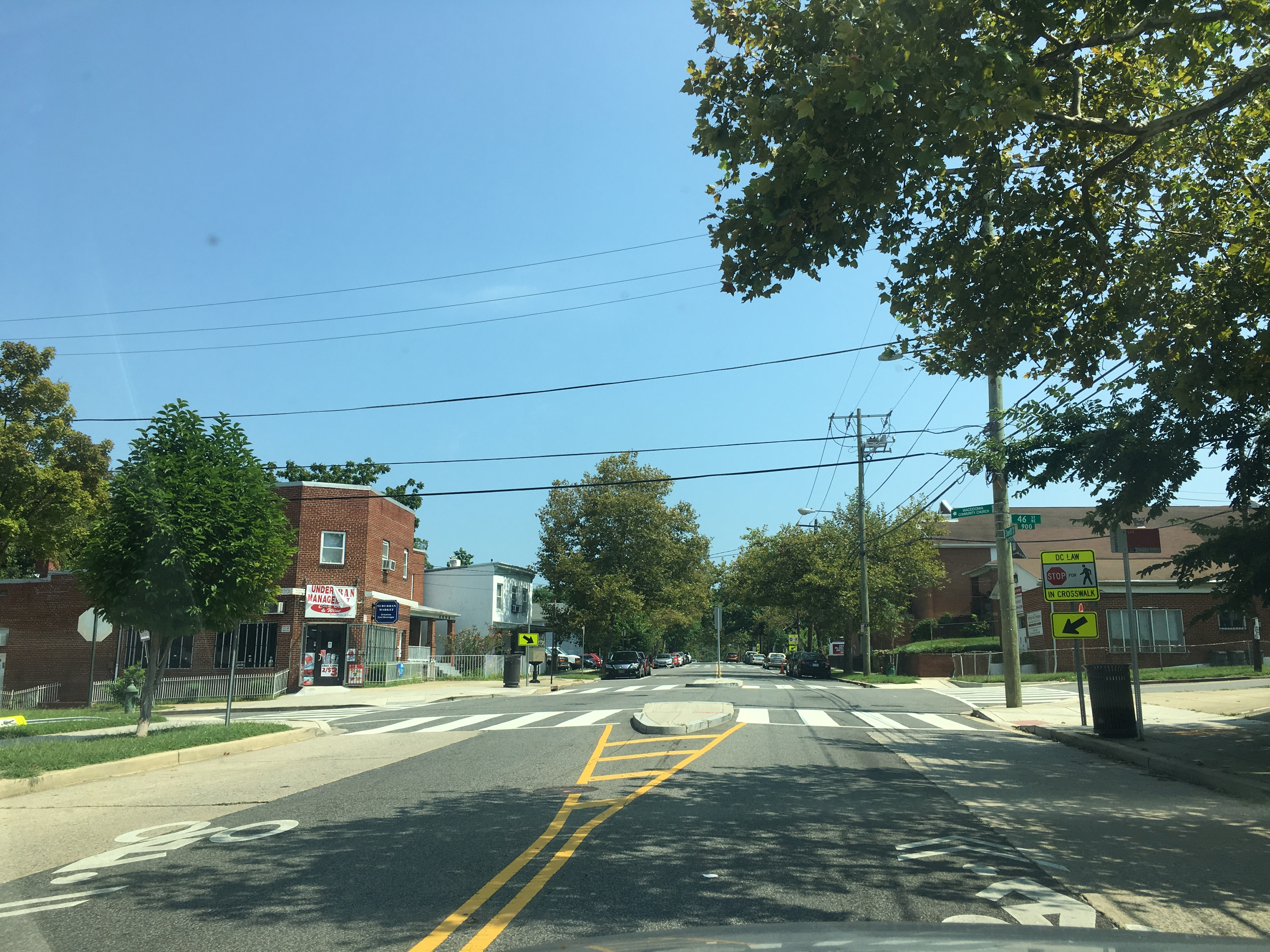
Deanwood neighborhood at the intersection of Sheriff Rd. and 46th St. in August 2018

Deanwood is a neighborhood in Northeast Washington, D.C., bounded by Eastern Avenue to the northeast, Kenilworth Avenue to the northwest, Division Avenue to the southeast, and Nannie Helen Burroughs Avenue to the south.

One of Northeast's oldest neighborhoods, Deanwood's relatively low-density, small wood-frame and brick homes, and dense tree cover give it a small-town character that is unique in the District of Columbia. Much of its housing stock dates from the early 20th century. Several well-known African-American architects, including William Sidney Pittman and Howard D. Woodson, and many skilled local craftsmen designed and built many of its homes. The neighborhood was once home to Nannie Helen Burroughs, an early civil rights leader and the founder of the National Training School for Women and Girls, an independent boarding school for African-American girls founded in 1909 and located on 50th Street, NE. Marvin Gaye (1939–1984) was also born and raised in this neighborhood. From 1921 to 1940, Deanwood was also home to Suburban Gardens (50th and Hayes NE), a black-owned amusement park that served thousands of African-American residents during a time of racial segregation.

It is served by the Deanwood Metro station on the Orange Line.

The neighborhood is featured prominently in crime author Jim Beane's short story "Jeanette."

== Schools ==
- Integrated Design Electronics Academy
- The Monroe School
- Houston Elementary School
- Aiton Elementary School
- The Fishing School
- H.D. Woodson Senior High School

== Churches ==
- Beulah Baptist Church, of Deanwood Heights, DC

== Libraries ==
- Deanwood Neighborhood Library

== Public transportation ==
Metro stations

- Deanwood
- Benning Road
- Minnesota Avenue

Major bus routes

- X-2 Minnesota Avenue to Lafayette Square
- X-9 Express Capitol Heights to Metro Center
- W-4 Deanwood to Anacostia

== Revitalization Efforts ==
Food Access

For a significant portion of the 20th century, Deanwood struggled to maintain food access due to experiencing food apartheid. Because of this, constituents would have to travel outside of Deanwood or support local initiatives to access affordable food. Supporting local businesses, however, also became inconsistent, often favoring new grocery stores that put them out of business. One solution to this setback, and many others, was the creation of a community garden. In terms of food access, the garden supplied fruits and vegetables to community members. Those in charge of monitoring the gardens also educated the community on different ways to prepare and incorporate these healthy alternatives into their meals. The garden boosted the local economy by providing jobs and volunteering opportunities for Deanwood residents. Additionally, the garden hosted various events to promote fellowship and education. One event hosted by a grassroots organization educated the community on the significance of gardening. It gave a platform for the local Student National Medical Association to provide free health screenings to the community. Through resistance and self-reliance, Deanwood residents were able to form their own solutions.

Recreation Center

Being a predominantly Black neighborhood in Washington, D.C., Deanwood has experienced discrimination and less investment compared to other neighborhoods in the area. In the past, this included lack of necessities such as public utilities. In 2010, with the input of many community members, Deanwood opened a $32 million state-of-the-art recreation center. Some of the facilities include a swimming pool, gymnasium, fitness center, library, and spaces specifically for seniors. The recreation center provides many services for youth such as after-school care, tutoring, music studio, and tech lounge. The Deanwood Recreation Center services and special events for youth act as outlets and further support their futures.

In July 2023, Aazaar Abdul-Rahim, a D.C. native and college football coach, hosted a football camp for youth at the Deanwood Community Center. The camp was an opportunity for youth to be active while also learn the pillars that go into being a good person and teammate.

In December 2017, the Deanwood Recreation Center added a tech lounge to provide a space for youth to learn and play. They also provide classes focused on navigating technology for all. In the same month, the center hosted a video game tournament to help encourage local youth to engage with their facilities.
