= Capitol Heights station =

Washington Metro station

Coordinates: 38°53′21.3″N 76°54′47.4″W

Capitol Heights
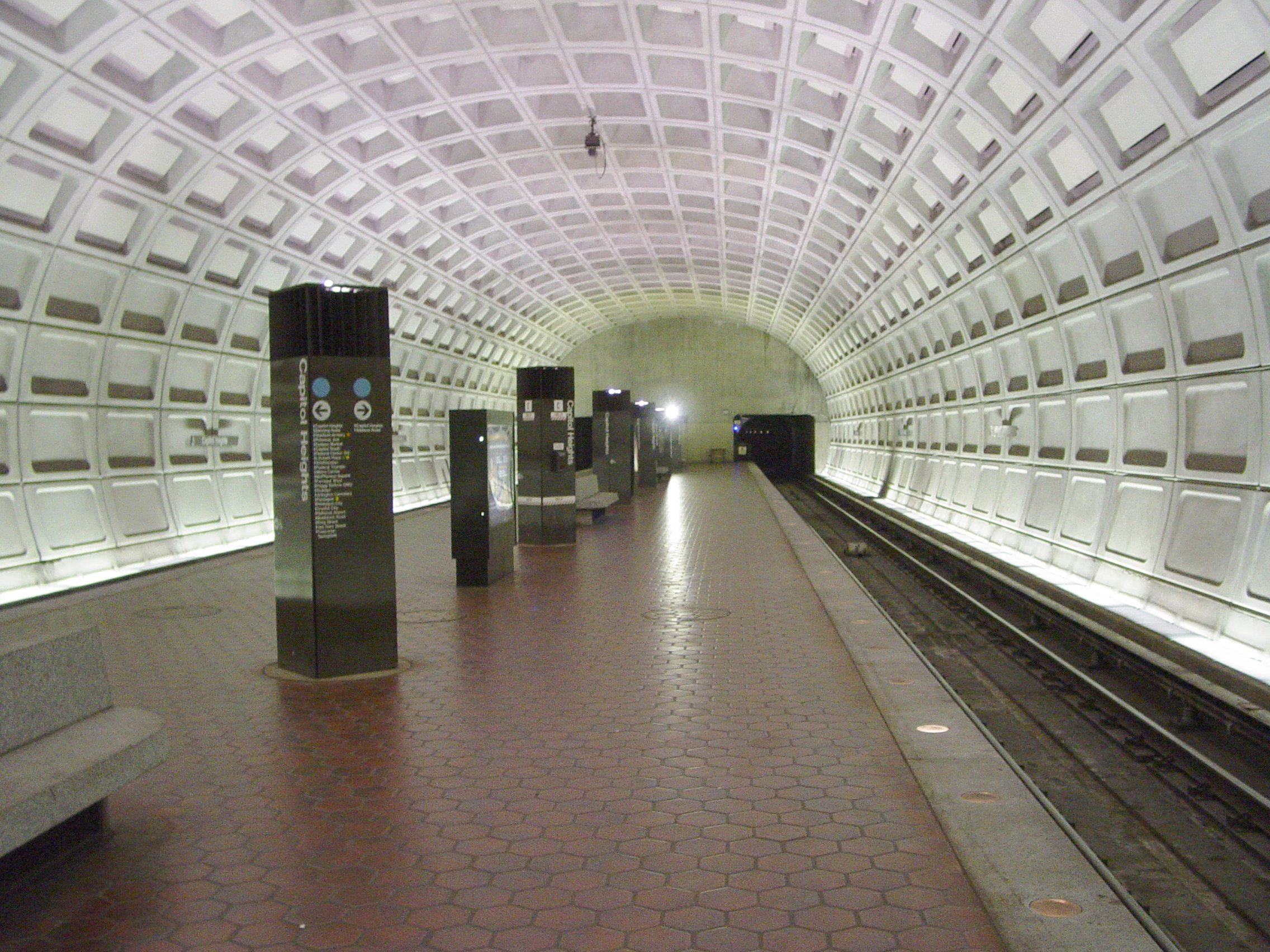
- Capitol Heights station platform facing east in July 2005

General information
- Location: 133 Central Avenue; Capitol Heights, Maryland
- Owner: Washington Metropolitan Area Transit Authority
- Platforms: 1 island platform
- Tracks: 2
- Connections: Metrobus: C31, C57, D2X, P63; GoPGC: P65

Construction
- Structure type: Underground
- Parking: 372 spaces
- Cycle facilities: Capital Bikeshare, 5 racks
- Accessible: Yes

Other information
- Station code: G02

History
- Opened: November 22, 1980; 45 years ago

Passengers
- 2025: 1,594 (average weekday)
- Rank: 86 of 98

Services
Preceding station	Washington Metro	Following station
Benning Road toward Ashburn	Silver Line	Addison Road toward Downtown Largo
Benning Road toward Franconia–Springfield	Blue Line	Addison Road toward Downtown Largo
Former services
Preceding station	Washington Metro	Following station
Benning Road toward Vienna	Orange Line	Addison Road toward Downtown Largo
Route map
Location

Capitol Heights station is an island-platformed Washington Metro station in Capitol Heights, Maryland, United States. The station was opened on November 22, 1980, and is operated by the Washington Metropolitan Area Transit Authority (WMATA). Providing service for the Blue and Silver Lines, the station is located at 133 Central Avenue in a residential area at East Capitol Street and Southern Avenue SE. This is the first station on the two lines in Maryland going east. As of 2017, in terms of weekday average boardings, it is the least used underground station in the system and the 10th least used station overall.

== History ==
The station opened on November 22, 1980, and coincided with the completion of 3.52 miles (5.66 km) of rail east of the Stadium–Armory station and the opening of the Addison Road and Benning Road stations.

In December 2012, Capitol Heights was one of five stations added to the route of the Silver Line, which was originally supposed to end at the Stadium-Armory station, but was extended into Prince George's County, Maryland to the Largo Town Center (now Downtown Largo) station (the eastern terminus of the Blue Line) due to safety concerns about a pocket track just past Stadium-Armory. Silver Line service at Capitol Heights began on July 26, 2014.

In 1997, Radisson station of the Montreal Metro's Green Line was redressed to stand in for Capitol Heights in the Bruce Willis movie The Jackal.
