= Congress Heights station =

Washington Metro station

Coordinates: 38°50′43.4″N 76°59′16″W

Congress Heights
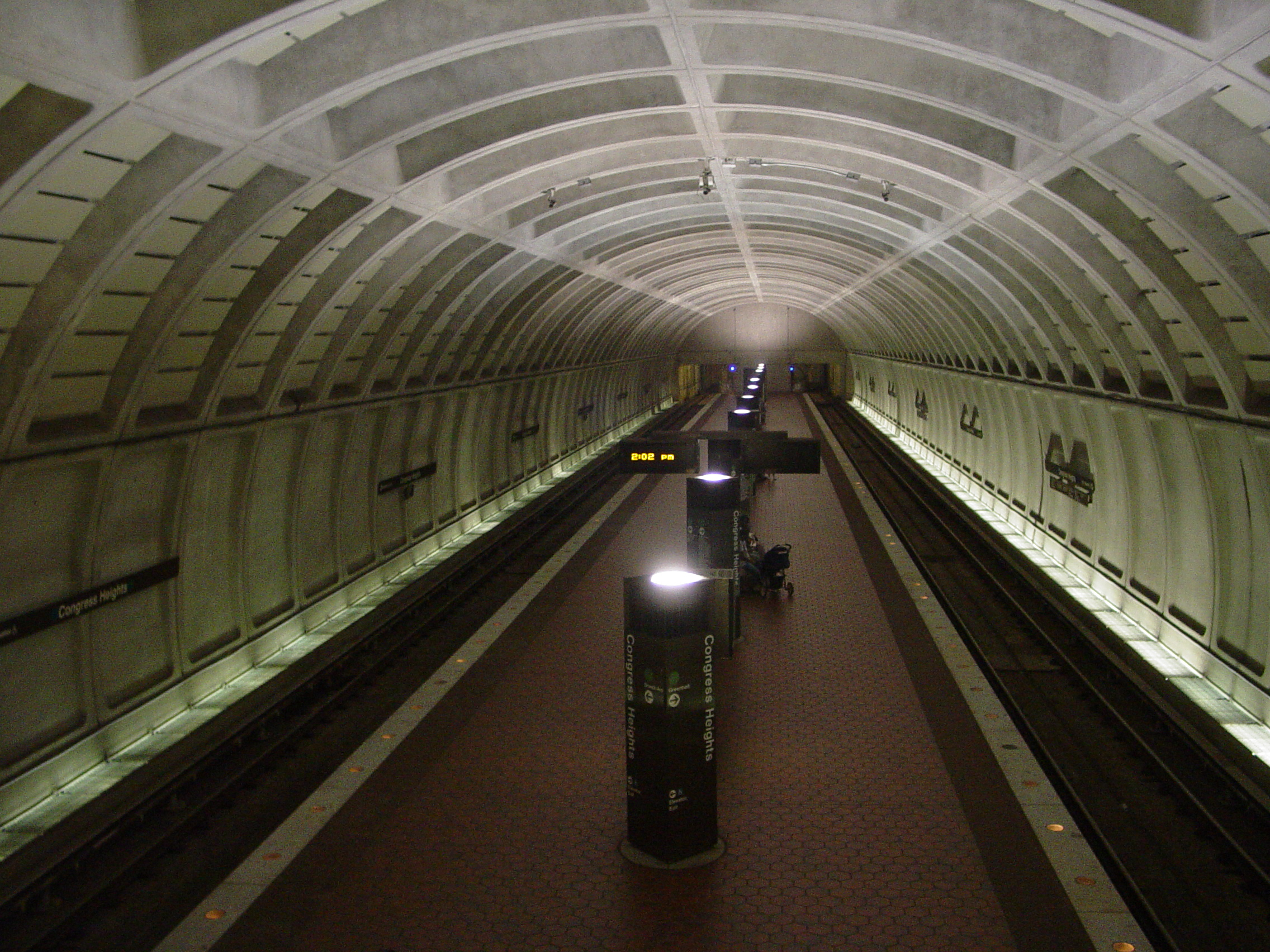
- Station platform facing north in July 2004

General information
- Location: 1290 Alabama Avenue SE; Washington, D.C.
- Owner: Washington Metropolitan Area Transit Authority
- Platforms: 1 island platform
- Tracks: 2
- Connections: Metrobus: C21, C27, C29, C53

Construction
- Structure type: Underground
- Cycle facilities: Capital Bikeshare, 10 racks and 12 lockers
- Accessible: Yes

Other information
- Station code: F07

History
- Opened: January 13, 2001; 25 years ago

Passengers
- 2025: 2,208 (average weekday)
- Rank: 75 of 98

Services
Preceding station	Washington Metro	Following station
Southern Avenue toward Branch Avenue	Green Line	Anacostia toward Greenbelt
Route map
Location

Congress Heights station is an island-platformed Washington Metro station situated in the Congress Heights neighborhood of Washington, D.C., United States. Opened on January 13, 2001, the station is operated by the Washington Metropolitan Area Transit Authority (WMATA). Serving only the Green Line, it is positioned at the intersection of Alabama Avenue and 13th Street, beneath St. Elizabeths Hospital.

Congress Heights marks the last station of the Green Line in the District of Columbia as it extends southeastward into Prince George's County. Congress Heights is the closest metro station to the CareFirst Arena, home to the Washington Mystics of the WNBA and the Capital City Go-Go of the NBA G League.

== History ==
Groundbreaking for the final segment of the Green Line occurred on September 23, 1995, and Congress Heights station officially opened on January 13, 2001. Its opening coincided with the completion of approximately 6.5 miles (10.5 km) of rail southeast of Anacostia, as well as the opening of Branch Avenue, Suitland, Naylor Road, Southern Avenue.

== Station layout ==
Congress Heights is the southernmost underground station on the Green Line and the whole transit network that features an island platform with escalator entrances on either side of Alabama Avenue. A park and ride and bus bays are located adjacent to the northern entrance. The station features the "Arch II" design found at Columbia Heights, Glenmont, Georgia Avenue-Petworth, and Mount Vernon Square.

The station's bus loop was reconfigured and expanded in 2026 to support the construction of a "transit-oriented" public library adjacent to the station.
