= Deanwood station =

Washington Metro station

Coordinates: 38°54′28.8″N 76°56′7.5″W

Deanwood
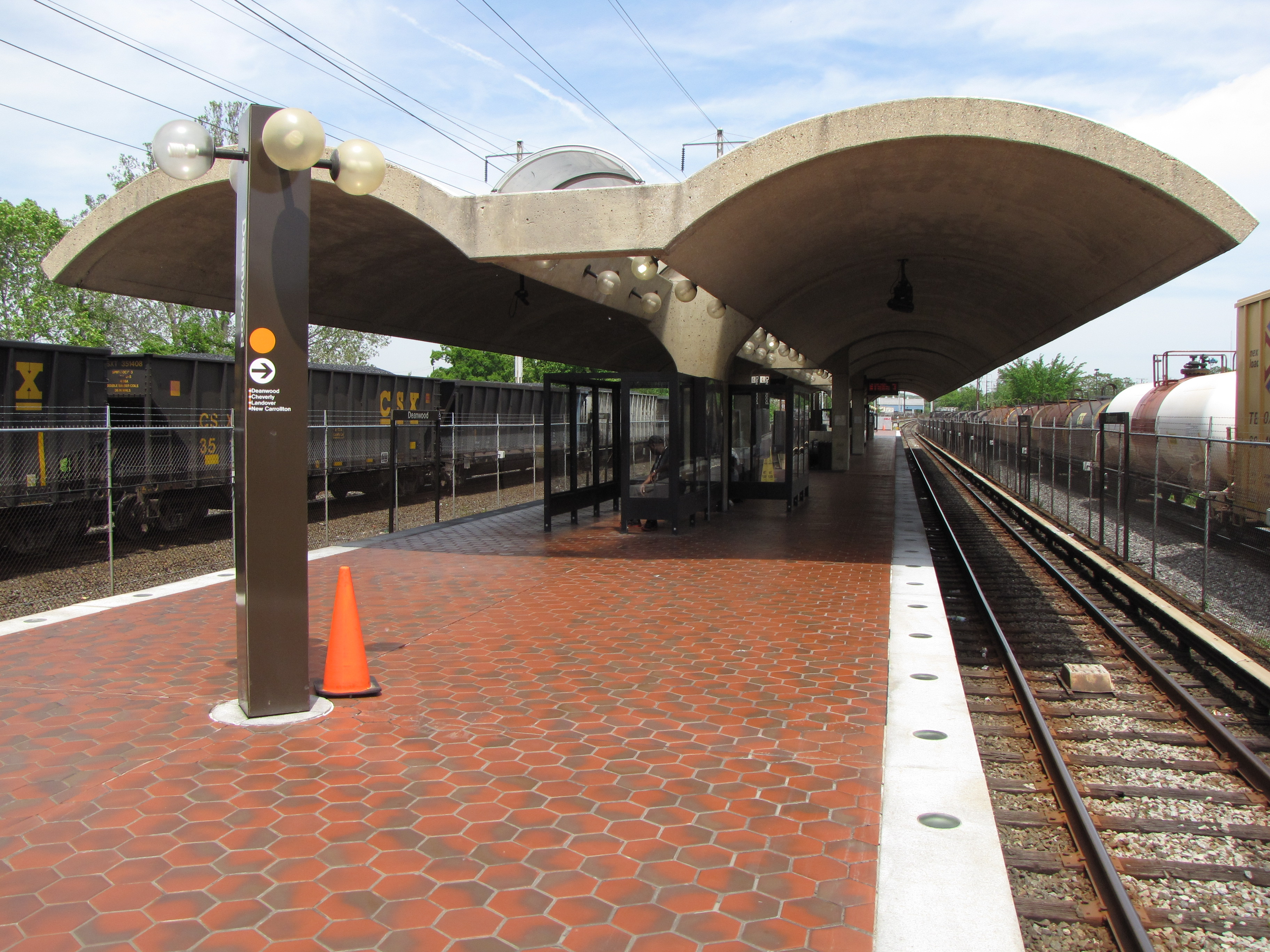

General information
- Location: 4720 Minnesota Avenue NE; Washington, D.C.
- Owner: Washington Metropolitan Area Transit Authority
- Platforms: 1 island platform
- Tracks: 2
- Connections: Metrobus: C23, C35, C63, D24, P14, P62; Anacostia Riverwalk Trail

Construction
- Structure type: At-grade
- Parking: 194 spaces
- Cycle facilities: Capital Bikeshare, 8 racks and 4 lockers
- Accessible: Yes

Other information
- Station code: D10

History
- Opened: November 20, 1978; 47 years ago

Passengers
- 2025: 1,261 (average weekday)
- Rank: 89 of 98

Services
Preceding station	Washington Metro	Following station
Minnesota Avenue toward Vienna	Orange Line	Cheverly toward New Carrollton
Minnesota Avenue toward Ashburn	Silver Line	Cheverly toward New Carrollton
Former services
Preceding station	Washington Metro	Following station
Minnesota Avenue toward Huntington	Blue Line	Cheverly toward New Carrollton
Route map
Location

Deanwood station is an island-platformed Washington Metro station in the Deanwood neighborhood of Northeast Washington, D.C., United States. The station was opened on November 20, 1978, and is operated by the Washington Metropolitan Area Transit Authority (WMATA). Providing service for the Orange and Silver Lines, the station is the final station in the District of Columbia going east. The station is located at Minnesota Avenue and 48th Street Northeast.

Deanwood averaged just 585 daily entries in 2023, making it the least-utilized Metro station in the District of Columbia.

== History ==
The station opened on November 20, 1978. Its opening coincided with the completion of 7.4 miles (11.9 km) of rail northeast of the Stadium–Armory station and the opening of the Cheverly, Landover, Minnesota Avenue, and New Carrollton stations.

In May 2018, Metro announced an extensive renovation of platforms at twenty stations across the system. New Carrollton station was closed from May 28, 2022, through September 5, 2022, as part of the summer platform improvement project, which also affected the Minnesota Avenue, Deanwood, Cheverly, and Landover stations on the Orange Line. Shuttle buses and free parking were provided at the closed stations.

On September 10, 2022, Blue Line trains started serving the station due to the 14th Street bridge shutdown as a part of the Blue Plus service. The service ended on May 7, 2023 with the reopening of the Yellow Line.

Half of Silver Line trains began operating between Ashburn and New Carrollton on June 22, 2025.

== Station Layout ==
The Deanwood station consists of an at-grade island platform situated between CSX freight tracks, built on unneeded land within the existing right-of-way. The station fare gates and mezzanine exist in a basement level underneath the south end of the platform, with entrances from both sides of the right-of-way. A bus bay is located outside of the southeast exit, between Minnesota Avenue itself and the station entrance. A small parking lot exists to the north of the southeast exit.

== Notable places nearby ==
- Kenilworth Aquatic Gardens
