= Central Northeast =

Coordinates: 38.8955°N 76.9414°W

- Neighborhood of Washington, D.C.
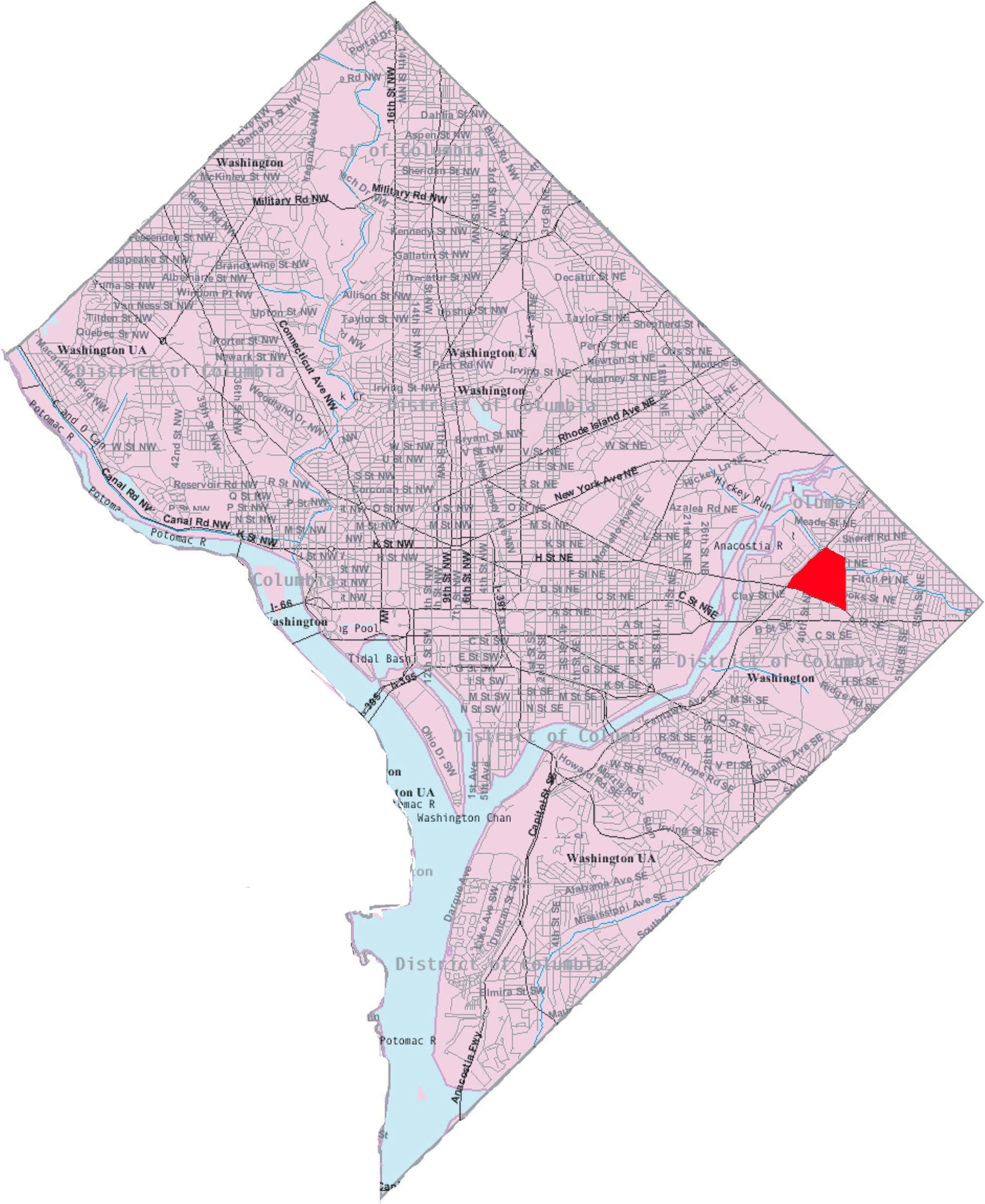
- Central Northeast within the District of Columbia
- Country: United States
- District: Washington, D.C.
- Ward: Ward 7

Government
  - Councilmember: Wendell Felder

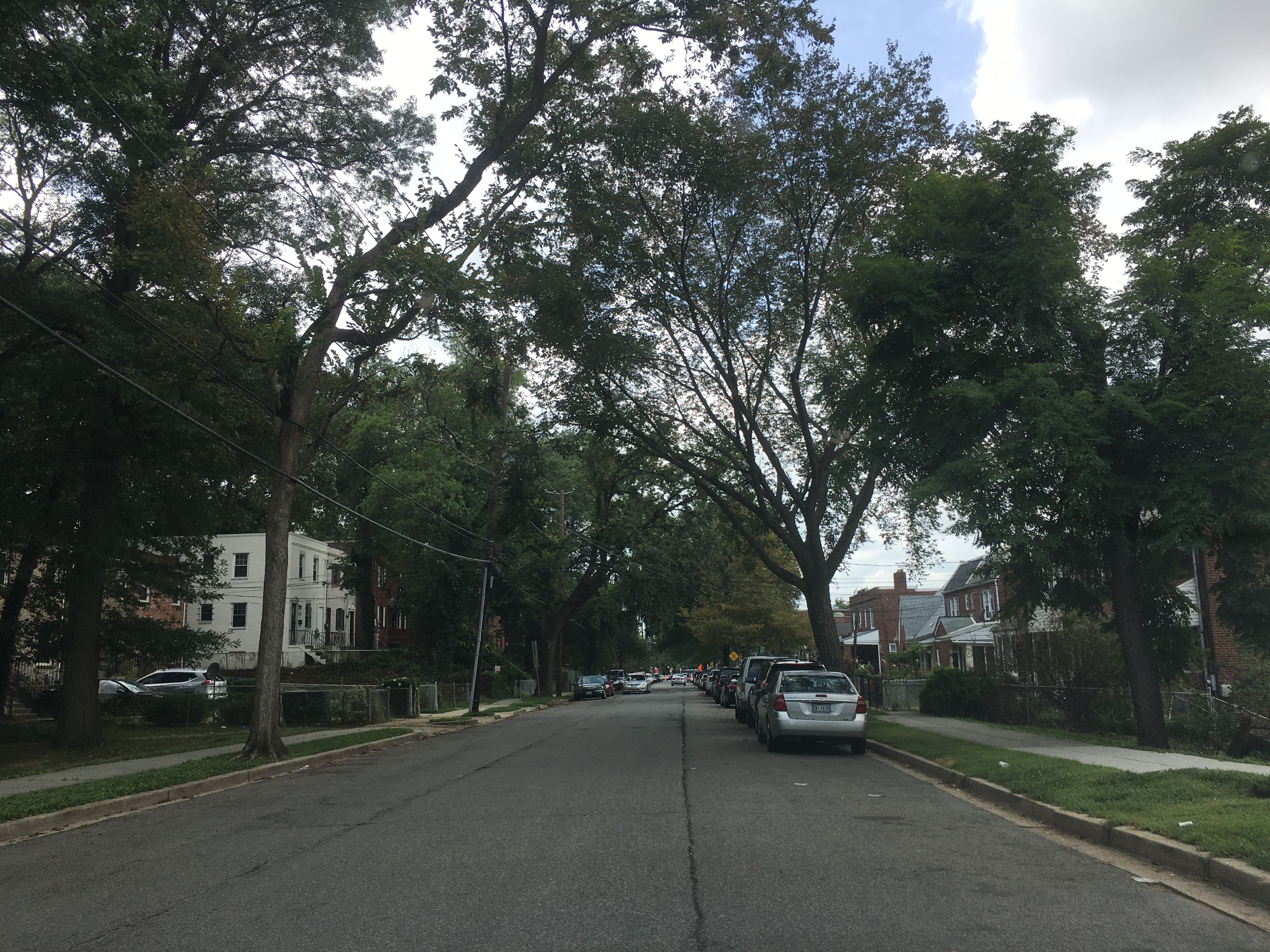
Mahaning Heights neighborhood at the intersection of 42nd St and Grant St NE in September 2018

Central Northeast, also called Mahaning Heights, is a small neighborhood in Northeast Washington, D.C., with Fort Mahan Park at its center.

== Location ==
It is bounded by Nannie Helen Burroughs Avenue to the north, Benning Road to the south, the tracks of the Washington Metro and Minnesota Ave station to the west, and 44th Street NE to the east. It is part of Ward 7, used for elections to the Council of the District of Columbia.

== Amenities ==
It is home to the Friendship Collegiate Academy, a public charter high school.
