= Ashley Jaye Williams =

Multidisciplinary American Artist

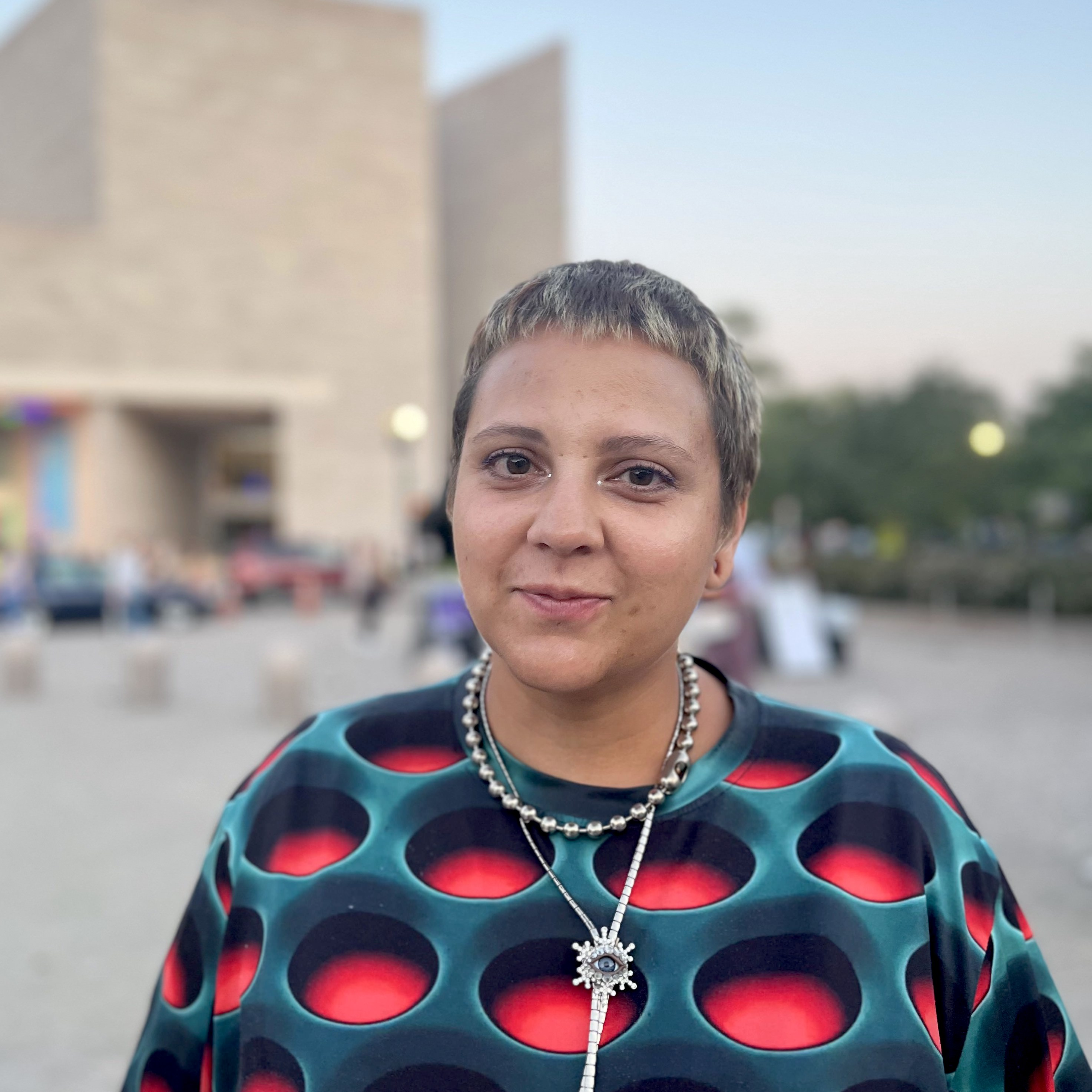
- Born: 1987
- Occupation: Muralist, artist
- Website: ashleyjayewilliams.com

Ashley Jaye Williams (born 1987) is a DC-based multidisciplinary artist and co-founder of the Model Mutiny Art Collective. Williams illustrated the 50th anniversary edition cover of Ms. Magazine. Williams has also had her work exhibited at Union Market, Washington City Paper, Homme Gallery, The Stamp Gallery. In 2023, she was awarded a fellowship with the DC Commission on the Arts and Humanities' Arts and Humanities Fellowship Program (AHFP) for excellence contributions to the District of Columbia.

== Personal life ==
Williams was born in 1987. She is married to artist Anthony Le, who she co-founded the Model Mutiny Art Collective with.

== Career ==
From 2015 to 2017, Williams worked as entrepreneur and painter Maggie O'Neill as her assistant.

Williams was commissioned by Ms. magazine's art director Brandi Phipps to paint the 50th anniversary edition cover for the Spring 2021 edition, which was inspired by the first ever cover of Ms. magazine's created by artist Miriam Wosk in 1972.

On March 13, 2021, Williams and other artists contributed to an online art auction called “Bid to Fight Covid II” to help raise funds for nonprofits during the COVID-19 pandemic.

In September 2021, Williams' illustrated work was the cover of volume 41, No 9 of the Washington City Paper. Her work was featured in the 2021 “Disco to the Go-Go” exhibition in Union Market.

In the summer of 2022, Williams completed her street mural "Grow Your Garden!" located at Drew Elementary School for the DC Commission on the Arts and Humanities and the District Department of Transportation's joint initiative "Color the Curb: School Safety Program." In that same year, her work was featured in the juried show Sculpture NOW 2022. On October 15, 2022, Williams created an interactive art installation with 23,000 baby hats for the #BigPUSH2022 to End Preventable Still Births event. She was also the recipient of a $7,000 grant from DC Commission on the Arts and Humanities' Relief and Recovery Fund (RRF) Grant Program.

In 2023, Williams participated in the DC Commission on the Arts and Humanities' Arts and Humanities Fellowship Program (AHFP) and was awarded a $5,750 fellowship for her contributions to the District of Columbia. That same year, Williams completed a permanent mural on the Selina Hotel (also known as the Selena Union Market). She curated the "2023 Queer Art Salon" exhibition located with the Selina hotel that same year, which featured the work of Lisa Marie Thalhammer, Nia Keturah Calhoun, and 14 other DC based artists. Williams and Thalhammer worked with Nia Keturah Calhoun on live art installations for the Capital Pride art party hosted by District Fray Magazine and Selina Hotel on June 3, 2023. Williams' work was featured in an exhibit titled "Love is destructive./I need you." located within the Stamp Gallery at University of Maryland, College Park from July 2023 to August 2023. On September 14, 2023, Williams was featured as a live muralist for the 50th anniversary of Hip Hop Late Night Block Party hosted by the National Gallery of Art. She is also featured in a group exhibit hosted by Rhizome DC titled "Existence as Protest" from September 3, 2023, to September 29, 2023.

She has also completed commissioned work for Google.
