= Capitol View Neighborhood Library =

Public library in Washington, D.C., U.S.

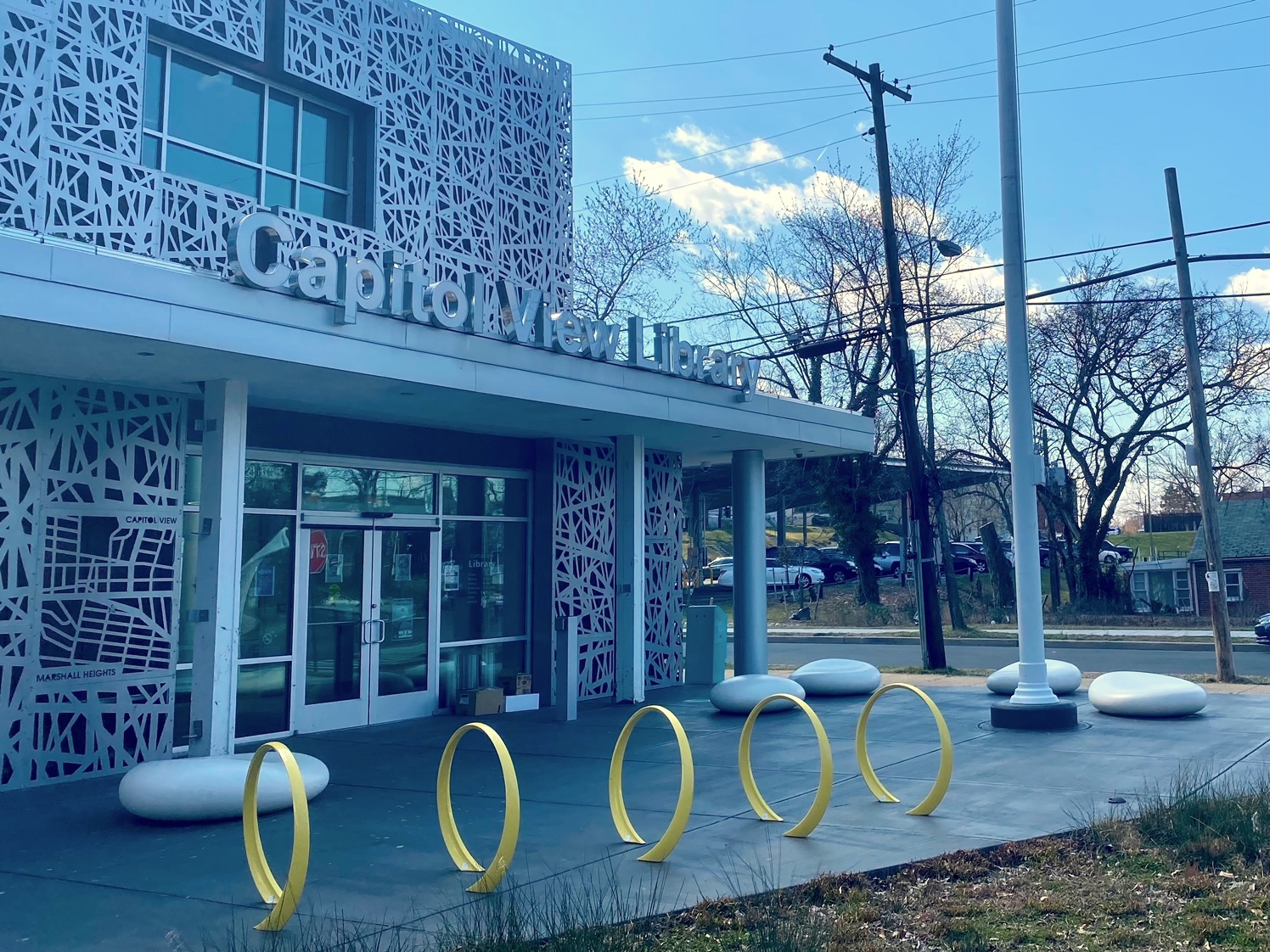
- 38.88895°N 76.92957°W
- Location: 5001 Central Ave. SE Washington, D.C. 20019, United States
- Type: Public library
- Established: 1965
- Branch of: District of Columbia Public Library

Other information

The Capitol View Neighborhood Library is part of the District of Columbia Public Library (DCPL) System. It was opened to the public on January 23, 1965, after 10 years of advocacy by the Capitol View community. A 2018 renovation introduced a new facade, an updated plaza, and the new sculpture "Freedom to Read."

== History ==
The Reverend Sister Patsy Allen, President of the Marshall Heights Civic Association, petitioned the Senate Appropriations Committee in 1963 to provide funds for a public library. Her request stated that "every moment delayed serves to undermine the educational structure of our children and adults as well.

Originally opened in 1965, the Capitol View Library was modernized beginning in 2017 to support more library services.

Improvements began with the renovation of the library’s interior in 2017. That phase of work increased the public spaces in the library by expanding the spaces for children and teens; adding more meeting rooms; replacing the furniture; and creating a new computer-training lab. The building’s HVAC and lighting were also replaced, improving the efficiency of the library, helping the building achieve LEED Gold certification.

The exterior renovations began in 2018. During this phase, a new facade was installed, new windows were expanded to provide more natural light, new fencing was added to the rear, and the plaza in front of the library was upgraded. The renovations included a sculpture, "Freedom to Read," designed by Davide Prete, which joined other public art already on display at the library. His work was selected after the DC Commission on the Arts and Humanities and the Library solicited professional proposals from local artists or artist teams. This opportunity was only open to resident artists and artist teams residing in the District of Columbia.

== See also ==
- District of Columbia Public Library
- Marshall Heights, Washington, D.C.
