= Davide Prete =

American metal and 3D printing sculptor

- Born: Treviso, Treviso, Italy
- Education: IUAV
- Known for: Sculpture
- Website: davideprete.com

Davide Prete (born in 1974) is an Italian-American metal sculptor and art professor at the University of the District of Columbia in Washington DC. Initially starting as a jeweler and metalsmith, Prete studied architecture at IUAV and worked as an architect for several years before starting his career as a sculptor in the US, specializing in public art and new technologies applied to art and architecture such as 3D scanning and 3D printing.

== Early life and education ==
He was born in Treviso, Italy, and learned metalsmithing from his father Alessandro and the sculptor Toni Benetton. He studied Jewellery and metalsmithing at the Institute of Art in Venice. He graduated in architecture at Università Iuav di Venezia and worked as an architect for Toni Follina Architects for several years. After moving to United States, he earned his Master of Arts in Art in 2009 and his Master of Fine Arts in Sculpture in 2010 at Fontbonne University in St. Louis with a thesis related to the use of additive manufacturing/3D Printing as negative in the Lost-wax casting process. After receiving his MFA, Prete studied digital fabrication with Fab Academy under the guidance of Neil Gershenfeld and Design for Additive Manufacturing at Massachusetts Institute of Technology. Prete taught full-time at different Universities and Colleges such as Corcoran School of the Arts and Design and Catholic University of America and now he works as Associate Professor at University of the District of Columbia.

== Career ==
Davide Prete shown his work in national and international art shows and conferences, such as the 3D Printing Show in London, Milan, and Paris at the Louvre. He created several public art sculptures and Outdoor sculpture in Washington, D.C. such as Light and Shadow in Preganziol, Italy, Freedom to Read for Capitol View Neighborhood Library, Sound Wave Art park in Washington D.C., Sneaky Cat and Koala for the Animal Public Art Project and The Mountain Lion for the Endangered Animal Public Art Project
