= Nia Keturah Calhoun =

Multidisciplinary American Artist

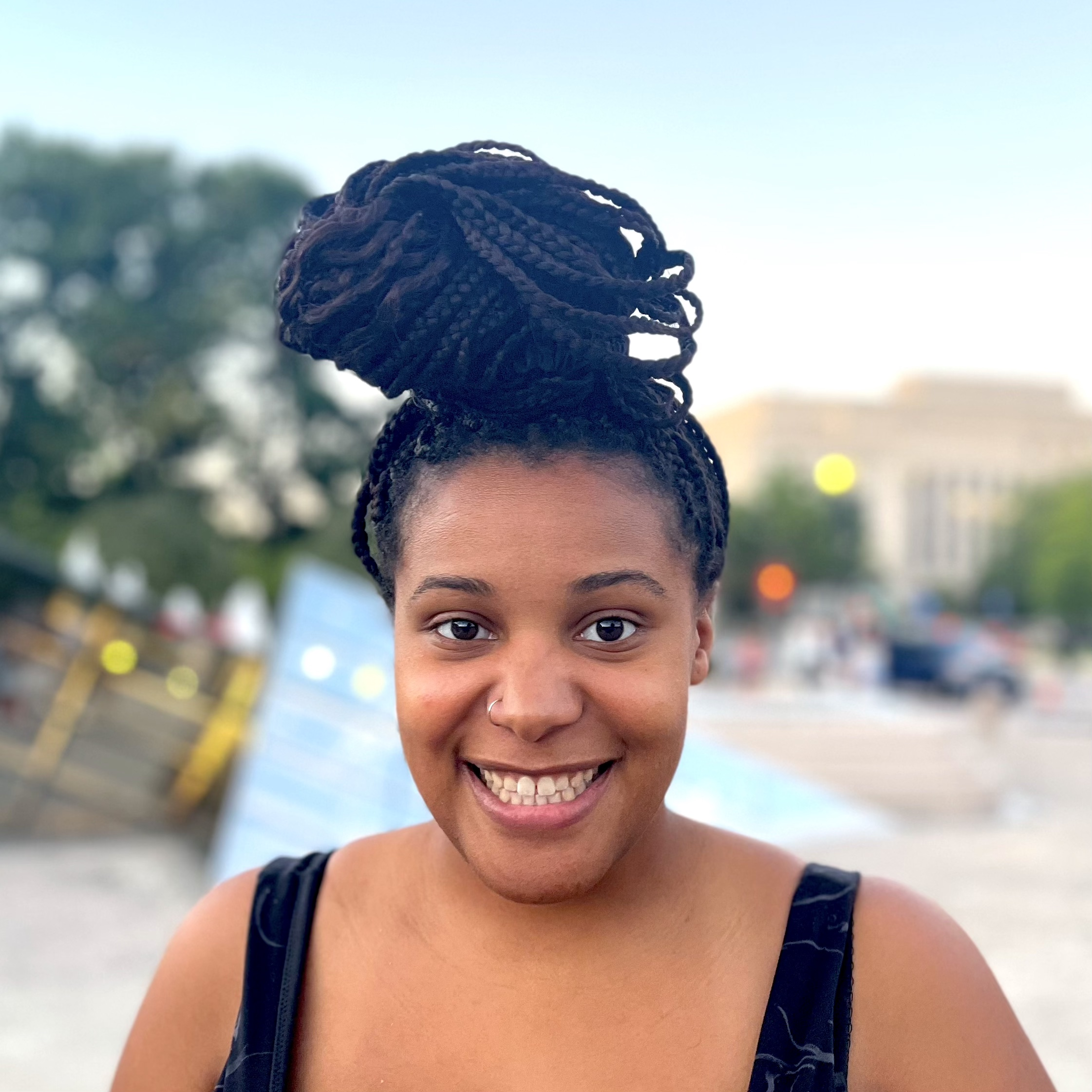
- Education: Spelman College
- Occupation: Artist, graphic designer, rapper
- Employer: Hirshhorn Museum and Sculpture Garden Library
- Website: nias.work

Nia Keturah Calhoun is a DC-based multidisciplinary artist who is best known for her mural on 14th Street of Supreme Court Justice Ketanji Brown Jackson. Her work was exhibited by Smithsonian Asian Pacific American Center, 2017 Women's March, and the National Cherry Blossom Festival. The Human Rights Campaign had also partnered with her in 2022.

== Early life ==
Calhoun moved from North Carolina to the District of Columbia when she was eight years old. Her father was a pastor in North Carolina but was originally from D.C. District Fray Magazine reported she has attention deficit hyperactivity disorder. She briefly attended Spelman College but dropped out after deciding to make a mixtape.

== Career ==
On November 7, 2012, Calhoun released her second mixtape 7. On March 25, 2013, she released her third mixetape "Po Lil Black Girl." Calhoun's song Wallflower featuring Davonne D'Neil and produced by Corbin Butler was released July 8, 2013. She released all of her mixtapes under her name "Nia Keturah."

Calhoun said she had started working as an artist professionally around 2014. She started out as a painter and graphic designer.

In 2016, her work was exhibited by the Smithsonian Asian Pacific American Center's CTRL+ALT: A Culture Lab on Imagined Futures.

In 2017, she was commissioned to create a piece for the Women's March. In 2020, she completed a street art work in support of D.C. music house SongByrd.

In 2021, Calhoun and Diane D'Costa were selected out of 129 submitters to participate in the National Cherry Blossom Festival's Art in Bloom exhibition alongside 25 other artists. Also in 2021, she was selected as one of three artists to be featured in the nonprofit organization SaveArtSpace's Out of this World public art exhibition that displayed artwork throughout Washington, DC on various bus stop ad spaces. In September of that year, she worked with Ashley Jaye Williams and Lisa Marie Thalhammer to complete a mural titled "TOGETHER," which is located in Shaw at 1317 9th Street NW.

Calhoun joined No Kings Collective at the behest of the design collective's founders Peter Chang and Brandon Hill. In March 2022, she designed, painted, and completed a mural on 14th Street of Supreme Court Justice Ketanji Brown Jackson titled "Facing the Sun" to honor Jackson's confirmation as the first Black Supreme Court Justice. Calhoun says she was inspired by 1960s and 1970s Africana art. The mural was completed in collaboration with the organizations She Will Rise and No Kings Collective.

In June 2022, the Human Rights Campaign partnered with Calhoun on a mural to commemorate Juneteenth. In July 2022, she was featured in the Academy Art Museum's Exchange: A Pop-up Art Expo. Exchange, curated by Brea Soul.

On June 3, 2023, Calhoun again worked with Williams and Thalhammer on live art installations for the Capital Pride art party hosted by District Fray Magazine and Selina Hotel. From July 7 to August 13, Calhoun was featured alongside 15 other DC based artists in the "2023 Queer Art Salon" exhibition curated by Williams and located with the Selina hotel that same year. On September 14, 2023, Calhoun was featured as a live muralist for the 50th anniversary of Hip Hop Late Night Block Party hosted by the National Gallery of Art.
