= Marshall Heights (Washington, D.C.) =

Residential neighborhood in Washington, D

- Neighborhood
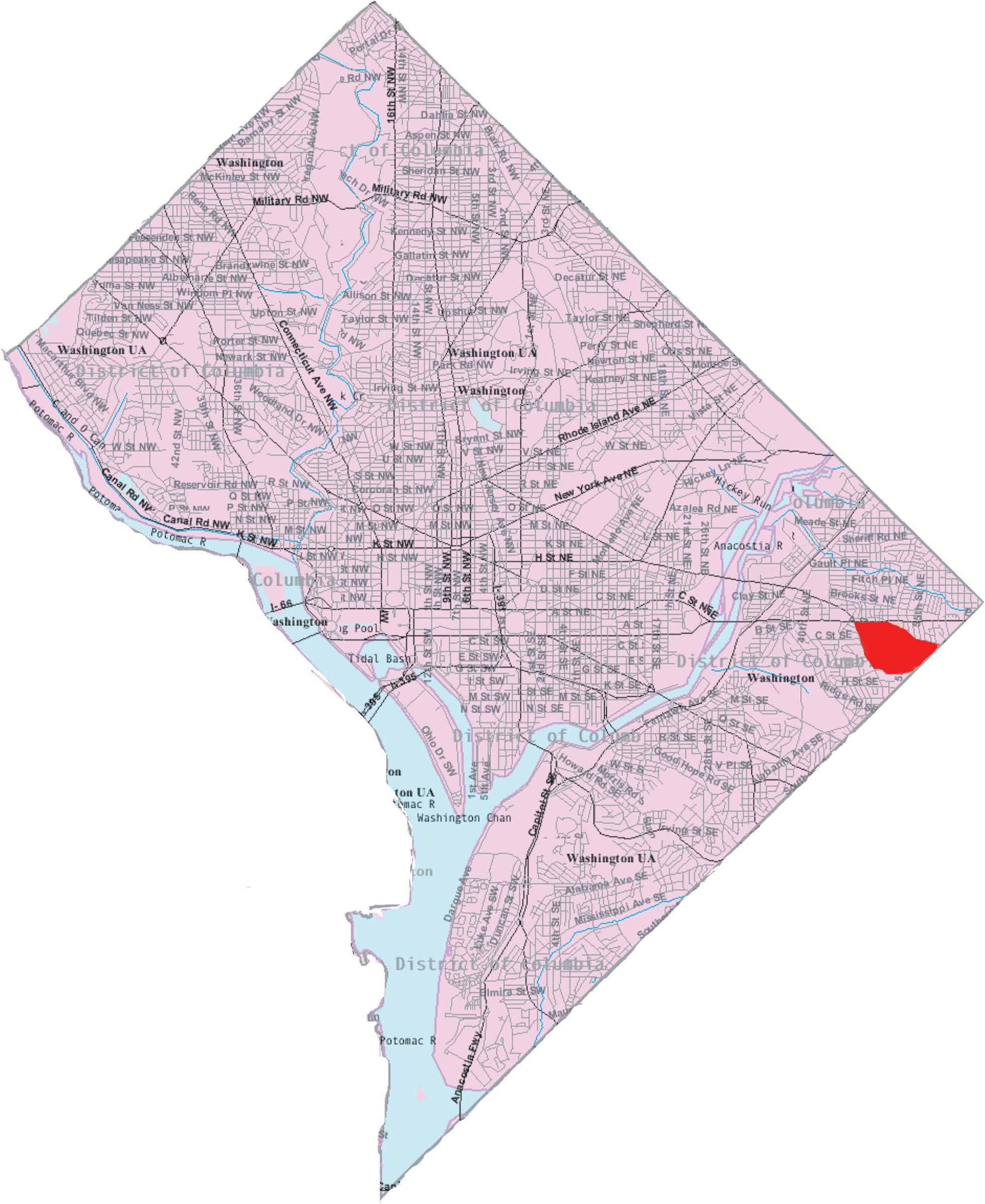
- Map of Washington, D.C., with the Marshall Heights neighborhood highlighted in red
- Coordinates: 38°53′6.5538″N 076°55′40.9038″W
- Country: United States
- District: Washington, D.C.
- Ward: Ward 7
- Constructed: 1886
- Named for: Colonial-era Marshall family

Government
  - Councilmember: Wendell Felder

Marshall Heights is a residential neighborhood in Southeast Washington, D.C. It is bounded by East Capitol Street, Central Avenue SE, Southern Avenue, Fitch Street SE, and Benning Road SE. It was an undeveloped rural area occupied by extensive African American shanty towns, but the neighborhood received nationwide attention after a visit by First Lady Eleanor Roosevelt in 1934, which led to extensive infrastructure improvements and development for the first time. In the 1950s, Marshall Heights residents defeated national legislation designed to raze and redevelop the neighborhood. Queen Elizabeth II of the United Kingdom visited the area in 1991, at a time when Marshall Heights was in the throes of a violent crack cocaine epidemic. Limited redevelopment has occurred in the neighborhood, which was the site of two notorious child murders in 1973.

== History of Marshall Heights ==
=== Origins ===
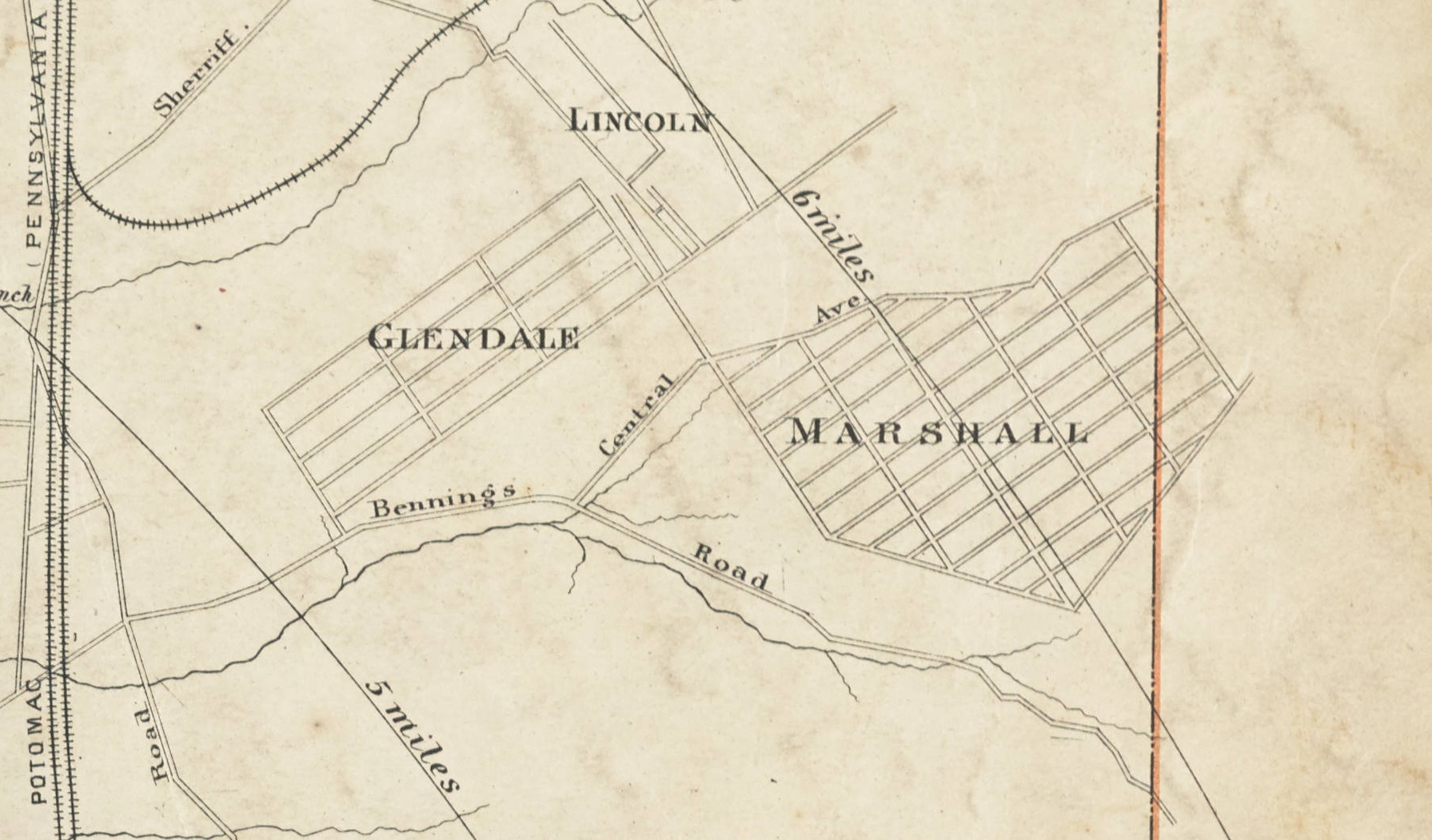
Marshall Heights as laid out in 1886. Up is northeast.

The geography of Marshall Heights is hilly, with some hills quite steep. Only one natural valley exists in the area, between what is now 53rd and 54th Streets SE.

Marshall Heights draws its name from the Marshall family, a prominent landowning family in Prince George's County, Maryland. (Note: Prince George's County was formed in 1696 from Charles County and Calvert County. The Marshall family, therefore, is also said to have resided in Charles County, even though this is not the present-day Charles County. Marshall Hall was the family mansion.) The neighborhood was initially part of the "Marshall tract", an extensive parcel of land in both the District of Columbia and Prince George's County which had not been subdivided. The Marshall family sold the tract to Charles A. McEwen, and his subdivision of the tract into Marshall Heights was approved by the city on April 22, 1886.

A narrow grid system of streets was approved by the district government for undeveloped areas in 1886 and imposed on the Marshall Heights area, ignoring the steep hills rather than going around them. Street names originally reflected major cities in the United States (Atlanta, Baltimore, Columbus, Charleston, Mobile, Newark, Trenton, Raleigh, Richmond, St. Louis, Wilmington), with a few named for trees (Beech, Mulberry, Palm, Sycamore, Walnut). Except for the new Central Avenue and St. Louis Street, every new road in the area would later be renamed.

One major landmark was incorporated into the new subdivision of Marshall Heights: Payne's Cemetery. John Payne was a free African American man who owned a farm east of Benning Road between what would later be C and E Streets SE. Payne's primary occupation was as a carpenter, however, so he used 13 acres (53,000 m^{2}) of his land to establish a cemetery for African Americans in 1851.

=== Development ===
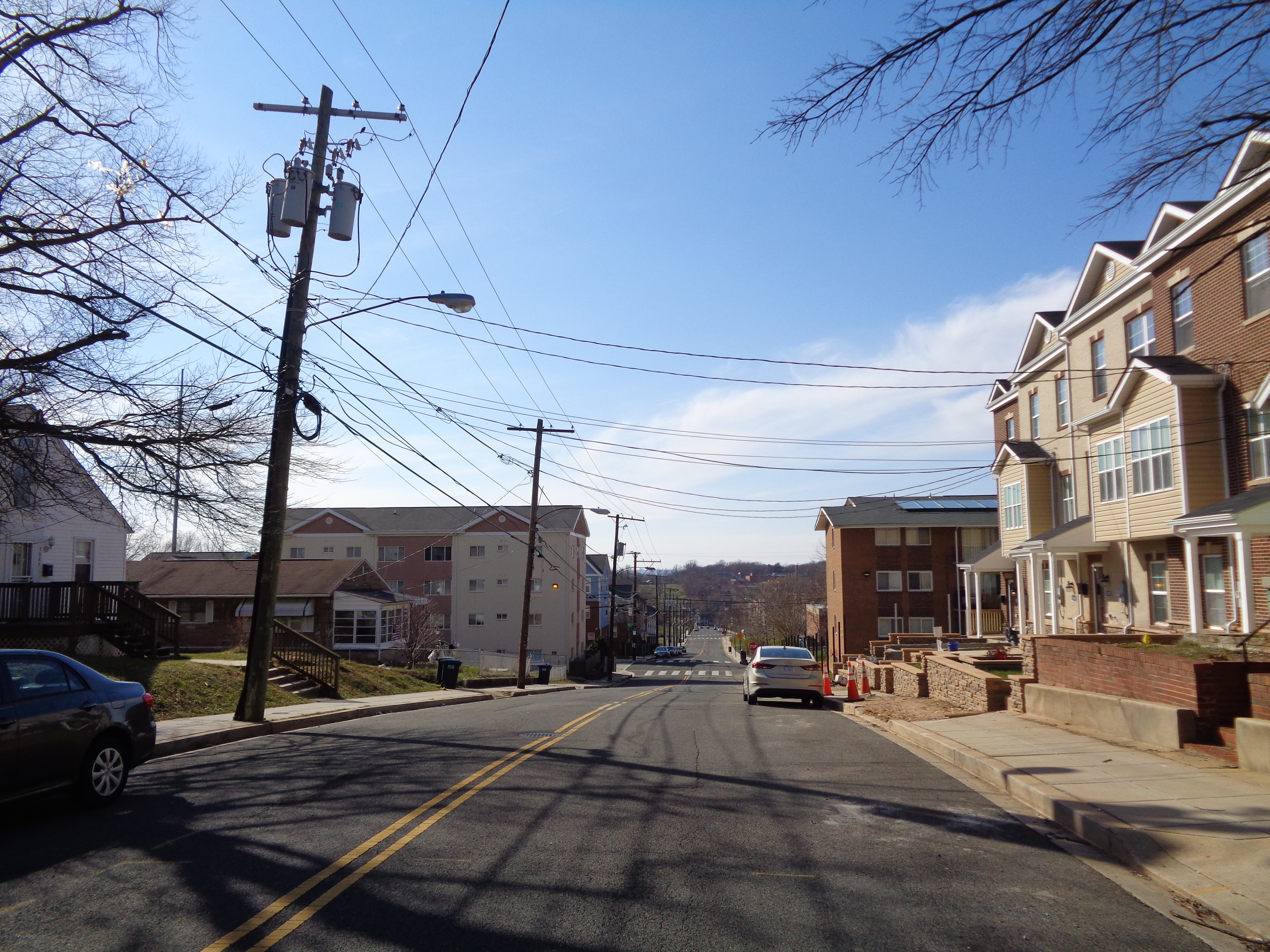
Marshall Heights neighborhood at the intersection of 50th St & C St SE

Marshall Heights was slow to develop. Much of the neighborhood remained forested countryside in 1900, with only a few dirt tracks providing access to it. There was no city-provided drinking water; the neighborhood's few residents used a local stream for drinking, cooking, and cleaning water. Most streets were not actually graded by the city until 1918, with District engineers using heavy cuts through hilly areas and extensive, deep fills in valleys to complete the street grid. The grid-like street design created significant problems for homebuilders here: Some homes were constructed on the edge of steep banks in order to have access to the street, while others were as much as 10 feet (3.0 m) below street level. By 1915, much of the area had been illegally settled by poor African Americans, who built shacks out of scavenged and discarded building materials. This led the area to be nicknamed "Shantytown" by D.C. residents. After World War I, the real estate developers who had inherited or purchased various blocks of land in Marshall Heights began selling it off at low prices. Since there were no housing covenants excluding blacks from owning property there, large numbers of African Americans began purchasing lots in Marshall Heights.

Land sales remained sporadic and low, however. By the late 1920s, Marshall Heights still lacked a city drinking water system and sewers, and the area was completely without streetlights. As late as 1927, only two houses had received permission from the city to be built in Marshall Heights. Illegally built homes were far more numerous, and many residents were so poor that they grew the food they ate. Drinking water was obtained from a spring near Central Avenue. In the early 1930s, developers began actively marketing lots in Marshall Heights to African Americans. African Americans fleeing the Deep South, which had been particularly hard-hit by the Great Depression, were able to buy lots in Marshall Heights and erect shacks there. Many of these families were so poor, they were forced to camp on the land they purchased until they could scrape together a combination of money and building materials to build a home.

On February 2, 1935, First Lady Eleanor Roosevelt made a visit to several poor areas of the District of Columbia, including Marshall Heights. She had long been concerned with substandard housing, and visited areas of the city with large numbers of alley dwellings and people displaced from their homes by the Great Depression. (Note: Originally, federal officials did not foresee that the city of Washington would expand to fill the boundaries of the entire District of Columbia. The "Federal City", or City of Washington, originally lay within an area bounded by Boundary Street (northwest and northeast), 15th Street Northeast, East Capitol Street, the Anacostia River, the Potomac River, and Rock Creek. The Federal City was planned city, and alleys were very wide so that a carriage house and even a servant dwelling could be constructed there while still providing enough room for a carriage to enter and maneuver. During the American Civil War, these "alley dwellings" were converted into housing for poor whites or poor African Americans (escaped slaves, emancipated slaves, and freedmen). Existing structures were expanded using found or discarded materials. Unoccupied space was rented, and home-made, haphazard shacks built. Alley dwellings could be up to two stories in height, and housed multiple families. Most of them lacked electricity and heating. Sanitation was provided by pit latrine or bucket toilet, and fresh drinking water could only be obtained from streetcorner fire hydrants. By 1912, 16,000 of the city's approximately 332,000 residents were sheltered in alley dwellings. On September 25, 1914, Congress enacted the Alley Dwelling Act to regulate alley dwellings and demolish the worst of them. But no funding was provided to implement the law. Eleanor Roosevelt's lobbied Congress for a new sanitary housing measure for the city, and a new Alley Dwelling Act was enacted on June 12, 1934.) Roosevelt found dwellings in Marshall Heights to be almost all sheds, and city relief workers began to encourage people to leave the neighborhood and move into better housing elsewhere. At Roosevelt's urging, the District of Columbia Emergency Works Administration (established in early 1934) acted swiftly to improve living conditions in Marshall Heights. By mid-March, the agency had laid 7,500 feet (2,300 m) of drinking water pipelines in an area bounded by St. Louis Street SE, Central Avenue SE, Fitch Street SE, and 49th and 54th Streets SE. Although only hydrants were supplied, more than 700 people (in 80 families) now received drinking water from city's water supply system.

=== Slum clearance fight ===
By the late 1930s, development in Marshall Heights, marked by professional construction of bungalows, was well underway. The city made some improvements, such as grading of new streets, regrading of older dirt streets, and paving of some streets, prior to 1945. But the city used inferior materials and construction in these efforts, justifying the "temporary" nature of the improvements by arguing that area would soon undergo a "complete redevelopment".

Makeshift housing still dominated Marshall Heights in 1945, and federal and city officials characterized it as a "shantytown". That year, Congress enacted the District of Columbia Redevelopment Act of 1945. This act established the District of Columbia Redevelopment Land Agency (RLA) and a $20 million trust fund. The National Capital Planning Commission (NCPC), an existing independent federal agency, was charged with developing plans to redevelop slum areas of the District of Columbia. The RLA was charged with implementing these plans, buying land and leasing or selling it to developers—replenishing the trust fund and allowing RLA to move on to new projects. Marshall Heights was picked as the NCPC's first redevelopment project. Unfortunately, no actual monies were appropriated for the RLA trust fund, and no redevelopment occurred. But because the RLA and the city were pledged to implement the NCPC's plans, they refused to permit private developers to make improvements as well. Moreover, when residents of Marshall Heights asked the city to install water and sewer lines in the neighborhood, the city refused, arguing that this would be a waste of money since all the infrastructure improvement would be removed once the NCPC's redevelopment plan went into effect. The federal government did, however, build a large number of red brick duplexes for sale to African American veterans on 54th Street SE between C Street and Central Avenue.

Funds for clearing Marshall Heights were deleted from the 1948 housing bill by the United States House of Representatives after protests by Marshall Heights residents and by John Ihlder, executive director of the National Capital Housing Authority. In 1949, President Harry S. Truman proposed spending $2 million to purchase land and raze all structures in Marshall Heights. The NCPC reported that just 30 percent of the homes in Marshall Heights had running water and sewer service, and that 86 percent of the homes in the neighborhood were so substandard that they should be razed. The agency proposed building 350 detached houses and 950 semi-detached houses, which would triple the number of people living in Marshall Heights to 6,000. Marshall Heights residents opposed the plan, arguing that they would be unable to afford the new homes being built for them. In early May, city officials approved the NCPC's redevelopment plan. In an attempt to support the redevelopment initiative, on May 17, 1949, the NCPC and the city both imposed a freeze on construction permits for the Marshall Heights area. No new construction, major improvements, or even repairs could be made by private or public entities to any structure in the neighborhood. Marshall Heights residents were outraged, and lobbied Congress for an end to the redevelopment program. On June 23, the House Appropriations Committee stripped money for the project from the housing bill. The Senate supported the House two weeks later. Marshall Heights residents had won their battle.

The Washington Post later blamed "resident apathy" on the failure of the redevelopment plan. J. Ross McKeever, redevelopment planner at the NCPC, claimed that Marshall Heights residents were ignorant and didn't want to be "redeveloped". But many redevelopment planners felt that the real cause was the failure to include residents in planning.

=== Infrastructure in Marshall Heights ===
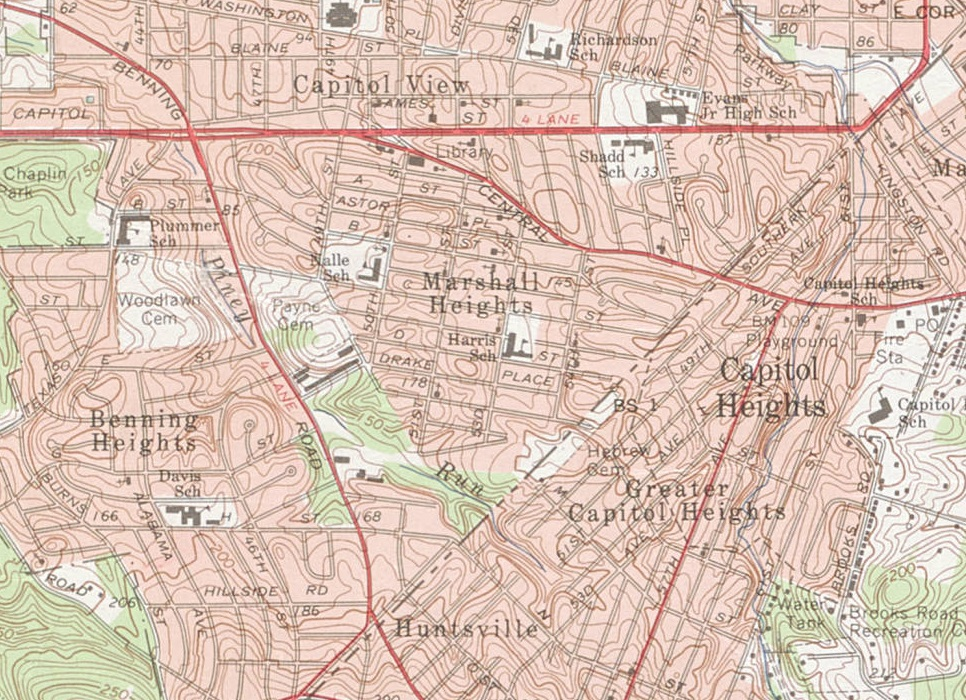
A street and landmark map of Marshall Heights in 1965.

In the late 1940s, Marshall Heights still lacked most modern infrastructure. Nearly all residents used backyard bucket toilet, and paid a "night soil" service to remove the excrement once a month. Roads were few and generally unpaved, and the few dirt roads that existed were in extremely poor condition. Residents found it difficult just to get in or out of the neighborhood.

With the collapse of the redevelopment plan, Marshall Heights residents began to demand in August 1949 that the freeze on improvements be lifted. City officials refused, arguing that with half of all homes in the neighborhood facing condemnation for safety reasons, redevelopment was the only option. The city also argued that it would be too expensive to build water and sewer lines along the existing street plan, and that residents would be unable to afford the hookup and frontage fees. In September 1949, District engineers staked out sewer, water, and natural gas lines along two streets in Marshall Heights to demonstrate the difficulties in construction and prove how costly the effect would be to residents. From this example, the city claimed that laying water and sewer lines in Marshall Heights would cost $1.2 million more than in any other neighborhood, and said that razing all the homes in the area, realigning streets around hills, regrading streets, and filling in valleys was the only feasible and cost-effective option.

The improvement freeze lasted into early 1950. Once more Marshall Heights citizens complained to Congress, and in March 1950 the House Appropriations Committee threatened to cut off all funding for the NCPC if it did not lift the freeze. The NCPC lifted the freeze the next day, and the city followed suit on April 27.

Infrastructure work now began in Marshall Heights. A city survey in 1949 found that just 30 percent of all homes in Marshall Heights had access to running water and the city sewer system. City engineers estimated in May 1950 that it would take $2 million to give the 500 homes in Marshall Heights water and sewer lines, and to grade and pave every street. But with an annual infrastructure budget of just $1 million a year for the entire city, they said improvements in Marshall Heights would take time. Nevertheless, the district agreed to spend $320,000 on water and sewer mains, and paving secondary streets, in 1950 alone. Paving of main streets, and adding sidewalks, curbs, and gutters was not planned, as this was not deemed urgent. By November, 30 homes on five blocks between E. 50th and E. 51st Streets had received water and sewer mains. Another $100,000 was spent on Marshall Heights infrastructure in 1952. By the end of 1952, 134 homes in Marshall Heights had water and sewer. But only 72 homeowners had actually hooked up to the system. City officials said the cost of a hookup, which ran from $1,000 to $1,500, and the $135 frontage fee were simply too high for most residents to afford. The city had the option of going to court to force residents to hookup and pay the frontage fee, but officials said this was useless because residents simply didn't have the income. Spending large amounts of money on Marshall Heights deeply angered some city officials. William H. Cary Jr., director of the D.C. Bureau of Public Health Engineering, claimed, "This will never be a place the District government will be proud of." But work continued, and additional street grading and water and sewer lines were laid in 1957. To counteract criticism that Marshall Heights residents didn't care about their neighborhood, the Marshall Heights Civic Association engaged in a two-month-long campaign to remove trash and weeds, sweep streets, improve empty lots, and generally eliminate blight from the neighborhood. The campaign won extensive media notice. The city spent a total of $700,000 on roads and water and sewer lines by the end of 1958.

Beginning in 1949, the District of Columbia began making housing inspections in Marshall Heights, looking for code violations. Inspectors found that 9 out of 10 homes failed at least one health, housing, or building safety regulation, and they concluded that 8 out of every 10 homes in the neighborhood should be razed or renovated down to the framing studs. In May 1950, city inspectors estimated that 150 of the neighborhood's 500 homes were so unsafe that they should be razed. Yet, by the end of 1952, the city had condemned just 65 homes. A second inspection wave began in 1957. But by year's end, only 39 homes had been condemned and razed. A total of 348 homes had been cited for housing and building violations by the end of 1958, but city inspectors revealed that just 78 had been repaired and brought up to code. When questioned by the media as to why more homes had not been condemned, the city said condemnations would simply make extremely poor residents homeless, driving them into other slums and worsening the overcrowding there. The inspection program was to have ended in 1959, but the city kept it going because so few Marshall Heights residents had the money to make repairs or improvements to their homes. (Of the 348 homes found to be in violation, 81 homes had seen no repair.) With condemnation not an option, the city decided to keep inspecting homes and putting pressure on residents. By 1960, this third wave of inspections found that 302 of 347 inspected homes were in violation of either housing or building codes. Another six homes were condemned after 1957, bringing the total to just 45, so in 1961 city officials sought to condemn another 25 homes. By now, inspections had cited a total of 661 housing units (apartments and homes), even though the housing stock was relatively new (the average age of a home in Marshall Heights that year was 17 years). Inspections were so frequent, and residents so fearful of them, that some homeowners were refusing to admit city inspectors.

In May 1959, Eleanor Roosevelt once more visited Marshall Heights, to see firsthand the extensive infrastructure changes which had occurred there in the 1950s.

By 1960, the city had spent $1 million grading and paving roads and laying water and sewer lines in Marshall Heights. But these improvements were mostly fundamental in nature. There were few curbs in Marshall Heights even in 1962, and gutters and sidewalks were rare. Some streets even remained unpaved. A major street improvement program in the neighborhood occurred in 1979 and again in 1981.

=== The lending crisis ===
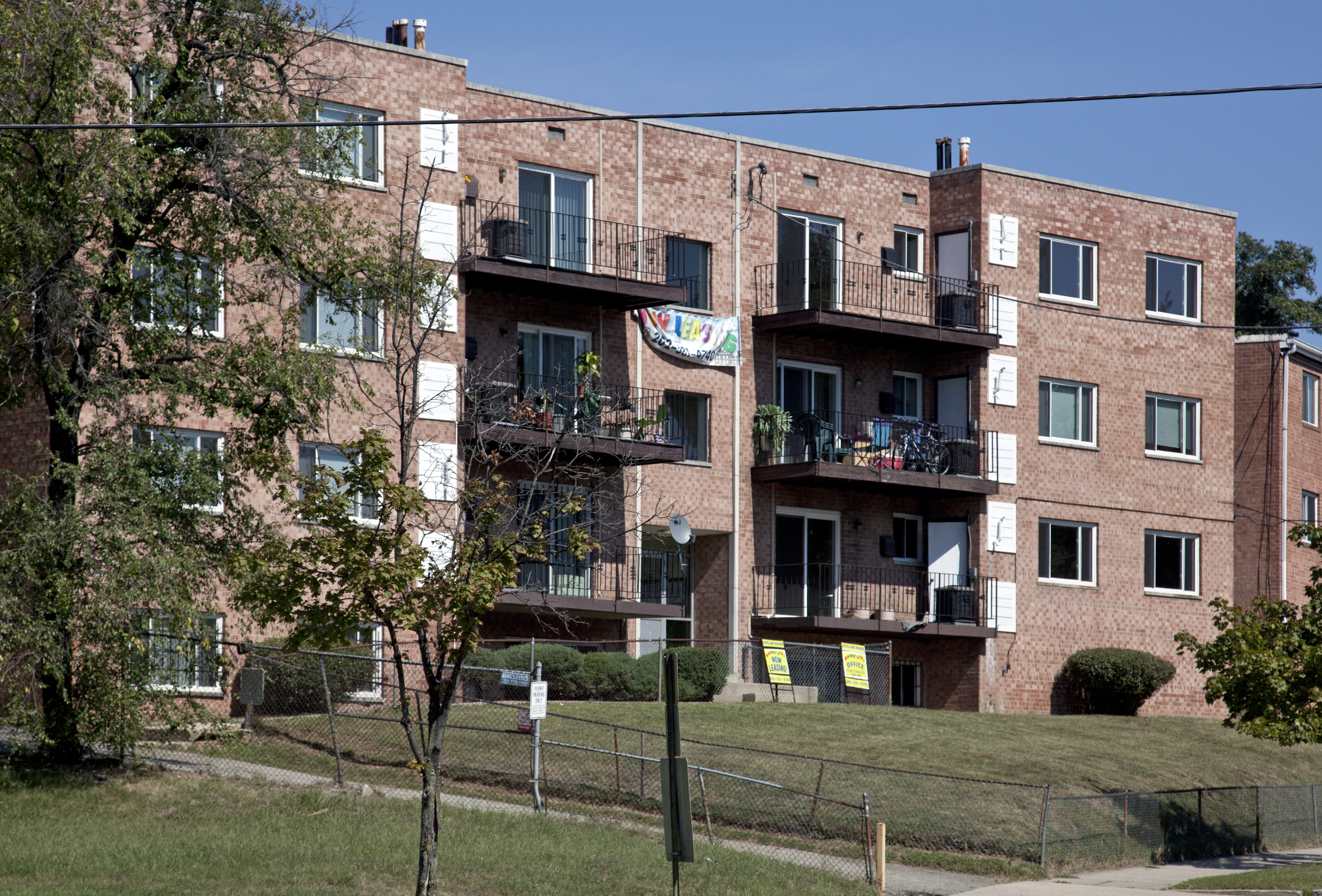
Copeland Manor, an apartment cooperative in Marshall Heights. The building is typical of the style used for many apartment buildings in the neighborhood.

NCPC and city officials attempted to remove the 1949 bar on the Marshall Heights redevelopment in 1954. The Senate Banking and Currency Committee approved legislation in May 1954 that would have removed the prohibition from the books, but this provision was deleted in conference committee.

By the end of 1958, there were reports of an emerging lending crisis in Marshall Heights. Many homeowners in the neighborhood reported being unable to qualify for a mortgage or home repair loan, since their incomes were too low and the value of their homes practically nonexistent. Private developers were unable to purchase land, because title to parcels were murky. The lending crisis continued into 1960 and 1961. Low home values as well as a number of empty lots drew middle-class African Americans into Marshall Heights throughout the 1960s. By the late 1960s, the area had a substantial number of small businesses and retail establishments as well.

The Martin Luther King Jr. assassination riots of 1968 drove most of the middle-class out of Washington, D.C. The loss of the middle class continued in Marshall Heights throughout the 1970s, destabilizing the neighborhood. Marshall Heights became poorer and poorer. In 1978, the city made its first federally-subsidized housing rehabilitation loan in Marshall Heights. (It had been trying to find a willing lender for one and a half years.)

=== The Fletcher-Johnson school ===
There were 14,000 burials at Payne's Cemetery from 1880 to 1919, but most burials there were unrecorded because they were slave graves, family interments, and illegal (so-called "bootleg" burials) made by people who could not afford the cost of an official burial. By one count, there were as many as 39,000 people buried at Payne's Cemetery.

About 37,000 bodies were removed from Payne's Cemetery to National Harmony Memorial Park cemetery in Prince George's County from March 1961 to November 1961, and fill dirt added to smooth the rough topography of the area.

Not all the graves had been removed from the site, however. In 1966 and 1967, another 2,000 or so graves were transferred from Payne's to National Harmony after the city declared Payne's to have been abandoned by its owners. The city seized the abandoned property and built Fletcher-Johnson Middle School and the Fletcher-Johnson Recreation Center on the site. These schools opened in 1978.

=== Drake Place SE: The crack epidemic and visit by Queen Elizabeth ===
In the early 1980s, Marshall Heights had a reputation as a poor but stable neighborhood of families and retirees. But an epidemic of crack cocaine hit the District of Columbia in 1985, bringing with it significant amounts of gun violence and murder. Marshall Heights, along with the neighborhoods of Anacostia, Garfield Heights, Shaw, and a few others, were among the hardest-hit. Drake Place SE was one of the most active open-air drug markets in the Mid-Atlantic region. Addicts from as far away as Baltimore and Frederick in Maryland and from West Virginia flocked to Drake Place SE in Marshall Heights to buy crack. Drug dealers from as far away as New York City came to Drake Place to sell crack. A series of shootings in 1989 gave the neighborhood the nickname "Dodge City". As the crack epidemic began to wane in the early 1990s, drug dealers began selling the hallucinogen PCP, which had the nickname "love boat". After three men were killed on Drake Place in late 1991 and early 1992, the street was given the nickname "Boat Drive".

On May 15, 1991, Queen Elizabeth II of Britain visited the 5300 block of Drake Place SE. The queen was viewing four homes built by the Marshall Heights Community Development Organization, and financially backed by the District of Columbia. Accompanying the queen on her visited were First Lady Barbara Bush, Secretary of Housing and Urban Development Jack Kemp, and District of Columbia Mayor Sharon Pratt Dixon. The visit received worldwide attention when 67-year-old homeowner Alice Frazier exuberantly hugged the queen (a major breach of royal etiquette). Queen Elizabeth graciously accepted the hug, and spent 20 minutes in Frazier's home. On June 4, 1991, the Council of the District of Columbia formally renamed the street "Queen's Stroll SE".

=== Neighborhood recovery efforts ===
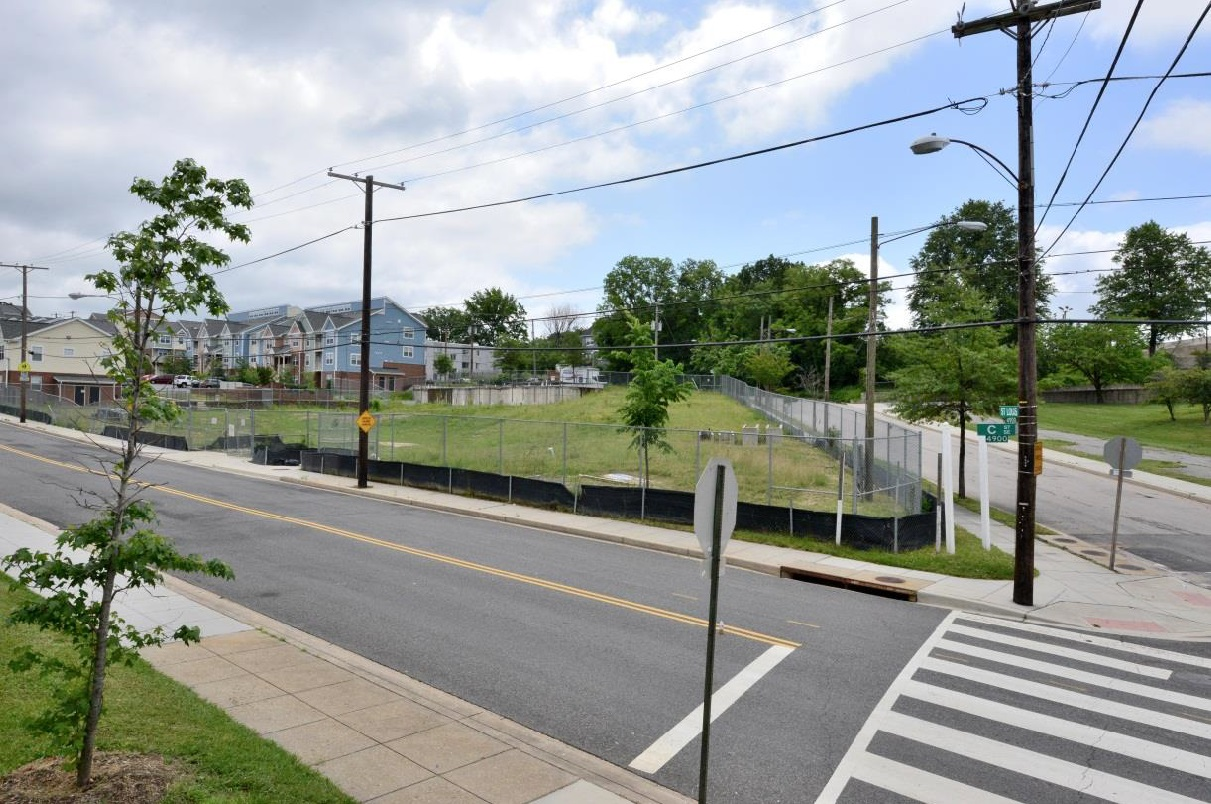
An empty lot, typical of the infill problems within Marshall Heights.

Limited redevelopment efforts have occurred in Marshall Heights since 1990. In 1989, the Marshall Heights Community Development Organization (MHCDO) secured financing from the Local Initiatives Support Corporation (LISC) and purchased four empty lots on the 5300 block of Drake Place SE. The MHCDO built four houses there and sold them to low-income families. But many homes in the neighborhood were still in poor condition. As late as 1995, Marshall Heights still contained a number of home-made houses with sheet metal roofs. Most of the notorious Eastgate Gardens was razed in 1998, and the remainder in 2002. A new public housing development, Glenncrest, opened on the site in 2008. In 2010, the nonprofit National Housing Trust purchased Copeland Manor (Benning Road SE, C Street SE, and 49th Street SE), a 61-unit apartment building. The apartment building became a cooperative, and National Housing Trust agreed to a lease-to-buy arrangement with the tenants' cooperative. In 2011, the city took title to the Bass Circle Apartments (Benning Road SE, B Street SE, and Bass Place SE), a five-building, 119-unit apartment complex whose owners had defaulted on their mortgage. The tenants partnered with Bass Apartments LLC, a subsidiary of Telesis Corp., to obtain a $4.843 million loan and rehabilitate the complex.

Infill problems are an issue in Marshall Heights, with several hundred empty lots scattered across the neighborhood. In 2014, a study by researchers from Bowie State University, George Washington University, and the Office of the Chief Financial Officer of the District of Columbia found that Marshall Heights was one of four neighborhoods in the city which made the largest median income and median property values gains since 2001.

== About Marshall Heights ==
Marshall Heights is bounded by East Capitol Street SE, Central Avenue SE, Southern Avenue SE, Fitch Street SE, Benning Road SE, G Street SE

The neighborhood is one of the oldest African American communities in the nation. The community was very slow to develop, and by 1961 there were just 2,449 residents living in Marshall Heights in 428 homes and apartments. The neighborhood's residents were mostly poor, but it boasted a stable base of middle-class residents. Although significant middle-class flight from the neighborhood occurred in the 1970s, by 1981 The Washington Post continue to characterize it as a middle-class neighborhood (albeit one with a large number of retiree residents).

=== Transportation ===
Metro and Bus Lines

Marshall Heights is served by two stations of the Washington Metro subway. The Benning Road station is on its northwest corner and the Capitol Heights station is near the northeast corner of the neighborhood. Both are on the Blue and Silver lines.

The area is served by the 25, 96, 97, E32, U5, U6, U8, and W4 Metrobus lines. The V1 line has two termini on Benning Road SE (Hanna Place SE and H Street SE).

Bikeshare

The neighborhood has two Capital Bikeshare locations to rent or return bikes and e-bikes:

- Benning Road metro (Benning Rd & East Capitol St NE)
- C.W. Harris Elementary (53rd & D St SE)

=== Schools ===
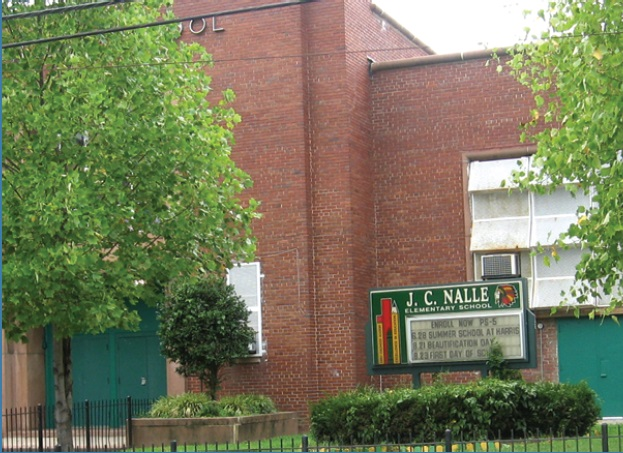
J.C. Nalle Elementary School in 2012.

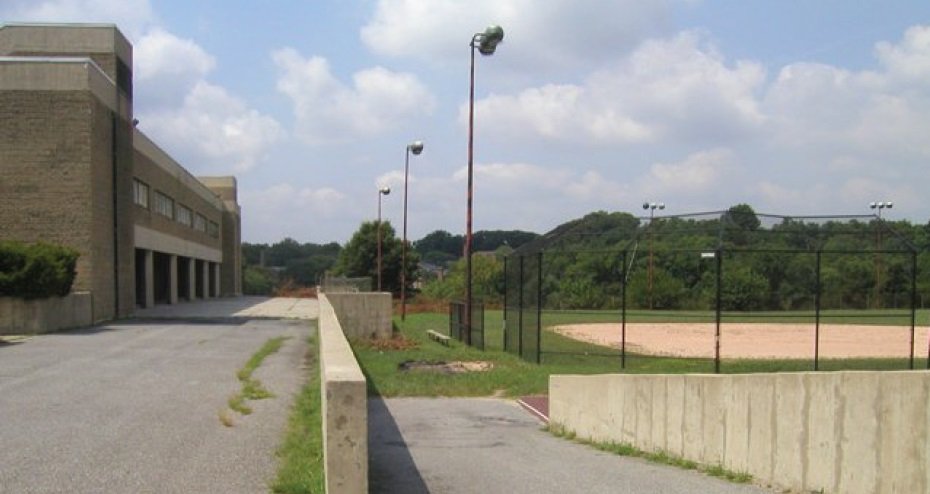
Entrance to the former Fletcher-Johnson Middle School (left) and a portion of the Fletcher-Johnson Recreation Center (right) in Marshall Heights in 2015.

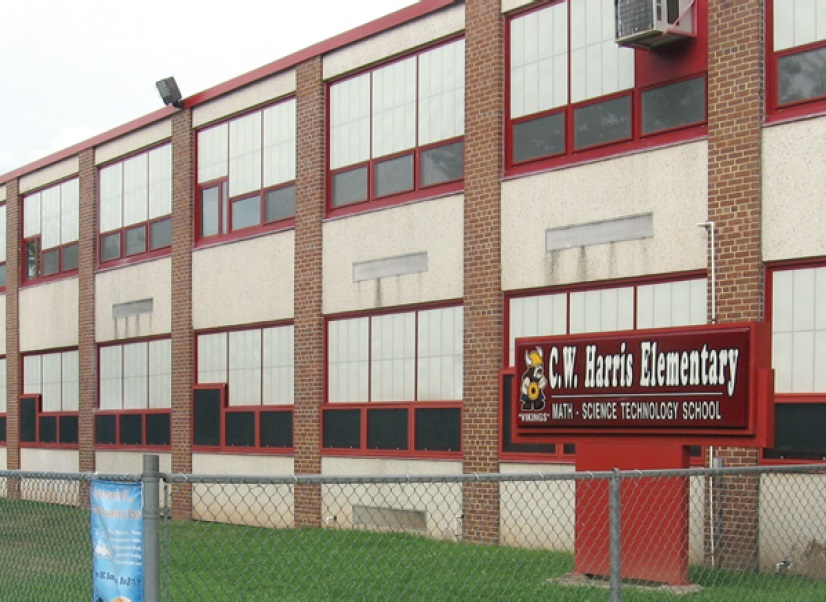
C.W. Harris Elementary School in 2012.

Two elementary schools, C.W. Harris and J.C. Nalle, are located within Marshall Heights. The $1 million Harris school began construction in 1960, and was finished in 1964. It underwent a renovation in 1992, a heating system replacement in 2002, and a superficial refurbishment in 2012. Nalle opened in 1950, and became the city's first community school in the late 1990s. It underwent a $6.8 million renovation in 2012. Declining enrollment led the city to close Fletcher-Johnson Middle School in 2008. The city had promised to spend $65 million to replace or upgrade all three schools, but only Nalle was renovated.

The neighborhood is also served by Kelly Miller Middle School and H.D. Woodson Senior High School, both of which are located just a few blocks north of Marshall Heights in the Lincoln Heights neighborhood.

Four charter schools are located in the former Fletcher-Johnson Middle School: KIPP D.C., KEY Academy Public Charter School, LEAP Academy Public Charter School, and Promise Academy Public Charter School. All four are operated by the KIPP charter school organization. Two more charter schools are located in the Capitol View neighborhood, adjacent to Marshall Heights to the northeast. As with all D.C. residents, children in Marshall Heights may submit their name in the city's lottery, to win placement in a charter school or out-of-boundary public school.

=== Community resources ===
Marshall Heights is served by the Harris Athletic Field (co-located with C.W. Harris Elementary School), the Fletcher-Johnson Athletic Field (co-located with the former Fletcher-Johnson Middle School, and the Benning Park Community Center.

The community is served by the Capitol View Neighborhood Library branch (5001 Central Avenue SE) of the District of Columbia Public Library system. The library is scheduled to close in 2017 for a nine-month, $4.5 million overhaul of its interior spaces.

The National Capitol Hebrew Cemetery (also known as the Chesed Shel Emes Cemetery; 4708 Fable Street SE) is located is the southeast corner of the neighborhood. It straddles the District-Maryland border.

=== Eastgate Gardens/Glenncrest ===
Eastgate Gardens was a large and well-known public housing complex located in Marshall Heights.

The National Capital Housing Authority (Note: The National Capital Housing Authority was originally called "The Authority". It was established by the District of Columbia Alley Dwelling Act of 1934, and charged with eliminating alley dwellings and slums in the District of Columbia and building low-income housing for the poor. Executive order 6868 (October 9, 1934) gave the agency a new name, the Alley Dwelling Authority. Executive Order 9344 (May 21, 1943) redesignated the agency as the National Capital Housing Authority, and charged it with constructing temporary housing for defense workers and military personnel during World War II. The agency returned to its original mission after the war, often converting the buildings it owned to public housing or selling them to private owners with the proviso that a percentage of apartments be rented at below-market rates. Under the District of Columbia Home Rule Act, as of July 1, 1974, the National Capital Housing Authority was abolished. Its legal authority and properties were turned over to the newly-established District of Columbia Housing Authority.) was under pressure from Congress to build extensive new public housing in the District of Columbia. Having delayed site selection for several years due to public opposition, in April 1960 the agency selected a hilly, 15-acre (61,000 m^{2}) site in Marshall Heights bounded by F, G, and 51st Streets SE; Benning Road SE; and Drake Place SE. The project displaced 14 families. The public housing project, known as Eastgate Gardens, was approved in September 1961. The $4.9 million cost ($21,327 per unit) was higher than that allowed by law, and required special approval from Robert C. Weaver, Secretary of Housing and Urban Development.

Construction on Eastgate Gardens began in 1961. The project initially housed 1,750 people, of whom 1,300 were children. Eastgate Gardens consisted of 230 units in 37 rowhouses designed for unusually large families, ranging in size from two to six bedrooms. To accommodate the demands of the hilly site, the architects used the rowhouses themselves as a retaining wall, and stepped each rowhouse slightly downhill from its neighbor in order to avoid extensive grading. Interior streets were constructed as cul-de-sacs, to prevent through-traffic and improve safety for children. Rowhouses were treated as groups, with each group semi-enclosing a small courtyard with a tiny play area for children. At the center of Eastgate Gardens was a 1-acre (4,000 m^{2}) athletic field and small natural amphitheater. The design of Eastgate Gardens was highly praised by Architectural Record magazine.

By the 1980s, Eastgate Gardens had deteriorated due to lack of maintenance and repair. The crack epidemic of the 1980s drew a number of drug dealers to Marshall Heights, and violence and gunshots were common. Eastgate Gardens drew nationwide attention in January and February 1989 after four homicides and 14 shootings occurred there. The Washington Post later called Eastgate Gardens "ground zero for crime". Residents there lived in extreme poverty in densely crowded conditions. The project became so decrepit that by 1992 most units had been abandoned and boarded up. By 1995, the city was characterizing Eastgate Gardens as "D.C.'s most distressed housing development." A local gang of drug dealers, the Eastgate Crew, nicknamed the complex "Gates of Hell".

By 1997, it was apparent that Eastgate Gardens had not been as well-designed as it could have been. City architects called the buildings poorly designed, and inappropriately sited. The District of Columbia Housing Authority now planned to raze and rebuild Eastgate. The city razed 34 of the 37 rowhouses at Eastgate Gardens in 1998, and the remaining three units in 2002. In 2004, the United States Department of Housing and Urban Development's HOPE VI low-income housing program awarded the District of Columbia $20 million to assist in the redevelopment of Eastgate Gardens. The city and private donors contributed another $56 million. Construction on the new complex, named Glenncrest, began in the fall of 2005. The city constructed 211 detached and semi-detached houses, 61 of them for rent to low- and moderate-income families, and the remainder available for purchase (outright or through a lease-to-own program) for low- and moderate-income families. (Note: Part of the project as a new community center, which would have house HUD's Community and Supportive Services Program, provided arts and vocational training programs for local youth, and acted as a site for economic development. A portion of the funding for the community center was provided by Def Jam Recordings. It was never built.)

The new Glenncrest opened in 2008.

== 1973 child murders ==
Marshall Heights was the site of two gruesome child murders in the fall of 1973.

On September 19, 1973, the body of nine-year-old Stanford J. Kendrick was found in a ravine at 38th Street SE and Pennsylvania Avenue SE near Fort Dupont Park. He had been sexually molested and bludgeoned to death, and his body partially burned. On October 20, the body of 12-year-old Joanie A. Bradley was found at 54th and E Streets SE near National Capitol Hebrew Cemetery. Her hands were tied behind her back, and she had been bludgeoned to death.

The murders shocked the city. Worried parents formed escort groups to take children to and from school every day, and to patrol streets at night and on weekends. The Washington Post called the murders of Kendrick and Bradley two of the four most shocking murders in the city during 1973.

On November 27, 1973, 11-year-old Penny L. Schroeder was murdered in Clinton, Maryland, her body found in a wooded area just a few blocks from her elementary school. She had been stabbed nine times, and bludgeoned to death. (Note: News reports and police testimony at Holmes' trial indicated that Schroeder had been sexually molested. But the autopsy found that, although her undergarments had been partially removed, there was no sign of molestation.) A number of eyewitnesses saw a young African American man walking with Schroeder shortly before her death. Based on profiles of mentally disturbed suspects living in the county, Prince George's County sheriff's deputies focused on Edward J. Holmes, a mentally disturbed 19-year-old man whose parents lived in Clinton but who was residing with his aunt at 279 54th Street SE in Marshall Heights. Holmes was arrested at about 10:30 PM on November 27, taken to Prince George's County, and interrogated for about four hours by Prince George's and D.C. police. Holmes made a taped and written confession in which he admitted to the Kendrick, Bradley, and Schroeder murders.

Holmes was tried in late August and early September 1974. Six eyewitnesses identified Holmes, and Holmes' mother revealed that her son had bragged about killing Schroeder in a telephone conversation. On September 4, 1974, Holmes was convicted by the Prince George's County Circuit Court of murder, rape, false imprisonment, sodomy, and carrying a dangerous weapon openly. He was sentenced to life in prison.

Prosecutors attempted to try Holmes for the murders of Kendrick and Bradley in the Superior Court of the District of Columbia. However, Judge Sylvia Bacon suppressed his murder confession and some additional evidence as illegally obtained. (Note: Judge Bacon ruled that: (1) Holmes had been taken across state lines without an extradition hearing, as required by D.C. law; (2) Holmes, who had an I.Q. of 66, was too mentally deficient to be able to waive his constitutional rights; (3) the failure to properly extradite Holmes made evidence taken in Prince George's County, such as the taped and written confessions and pubic hair samples, inadmissible; (4) Holmes' handwritten confession, which he had signed, had been lost by Prince George's County law enforcement and thus could not be used in D.C.; (5) Holmes had never signed the typewritten confession, and thus it could not be used as evidence; and that (6) Holmes was too mentally deficient to waive his extradition rights or understand the confessions he had signed.) In United States v. Holmes, 380 A.2d 598 (D.C. 1977), the District of Columbia Court of Appeals upheld the ruling of the Superior Court. D.C. prosecutors said afterward that they would not attempt to try Holmes in the District of Columbia.

== Bibliography ==
- Bednar, Michael J. (2006). L'Enfant's Legacy: Public Open Spaces in Washington, D.C. Baltimore, Md.: Johns Hopkins University Press. ISBN 0801883180.
- Benedetto, Robert; Donovan, Jane; Du Vall, Kathleen (2003). Historical Dictionary of Washington, D.C.. Lanham, Md.: Scarecrow Press. ISBN 0810840944.
- Black, Allida (2005). "Roosevelt, Anna Eleanor". In Herrick, John M.; Stuart, Paul H. (eds.). Encyclopedia of Social Welfare History in North America. Thousand Oaks, Calif.: Sage. ISBN 9781412952521.
- District of Columbia Office of Planning and Development (1982). Ward 7 Notebook (Report). Washington, D.C.: Government of the District of Columbia.
- General Accounting Office (1995). Community Development: Comprehensive Approaches Address Multiple Needs but Are Challenging to Implement. GAO/RCED/HEHS-96-69. Comprehensive approaches address multiple needs but are challenging to implement. Washington, D.C.: U.S. Government Printing Office. hdl:2027/uc1.d0007556459.
- Gilmore, Matthew B.; Harrison, Michael R. (Fall 2002 – Winter 2003). "A Catalog of Suburban Subdivisions of the District of Columbia, 1854–1902". Washington History: 26–55.
- Gutheim, Frederick; Lee, Antoinette (2006). Worthy of the Nation: Washington, D.C., from L'Enfant to the National Capital Planning Commission. Baltimore, Md.: Johns Hopkins University Press. ISBN 9780801883286.
- Hagner, Alexander (1904). "Street Nomenclature of Washington City". Records of the Columbia Historical Society: 237–261.
- Hawkins, Don Alexander (Spring–Summer 1991). "The Landscape of the Federal City: A 1792 Walking Tour". Washington History: 10–33.
- National Capitol Planning Commission (1976). Planning Washington, 1924–1976: An Era of Planning for the National Capital and Environs. Washington, D.C.: U.S. Government Printing Office. hdl:2027/uiug.30112029045413.
- Peck, Garrett (2011). Prohibition in Washington, D.C.: How Dry We Weren't. Charleston, S.C.: History Press. ISBN 9781609492366.
- Richardson, Steven J. (1989). "The Burial Grounds of Black Washington: 1880–1919". Records of the Columbia Historical Society, Washington, D.C.: 304–326.
- Subcommittee on Housing and Community Opportunity (2007). Reauthorization of the HOPE VI Program. Committee on Financial Services. U.S. House of Representatives. 110th Cong., 1st sess. Serial No. 110-44. Washington, D.C.: U.S. Government Printing Office. hdl:2027/pst.000061510920. ISBN 9780160796067.
- Subcommittee on Housing and Rents (1950). Conference on Marshall Heights. Committee on Banking and Currency. U.S. Senate. 81st Cong., 1st Sess. Washington, D.C.: U.S. Government Printing Office. hdl:2027/umn.31951d03596510x.
