= Rainbow Road (Washington, D.C.) =

2025 mural

- Year: 2025
- Location: Washington, D.C., United States

Rainbow Road is a mural by Lisa Marie Thalhammer being painted in Washington, D.C., United States. Installed ahead of WorldPride, it has been described as the world's longest LGBTQ mural.

== See also ==
- List of public art in Washington, D.C.
