= Toni Benetton =

Italian sculptor (1910–1996)

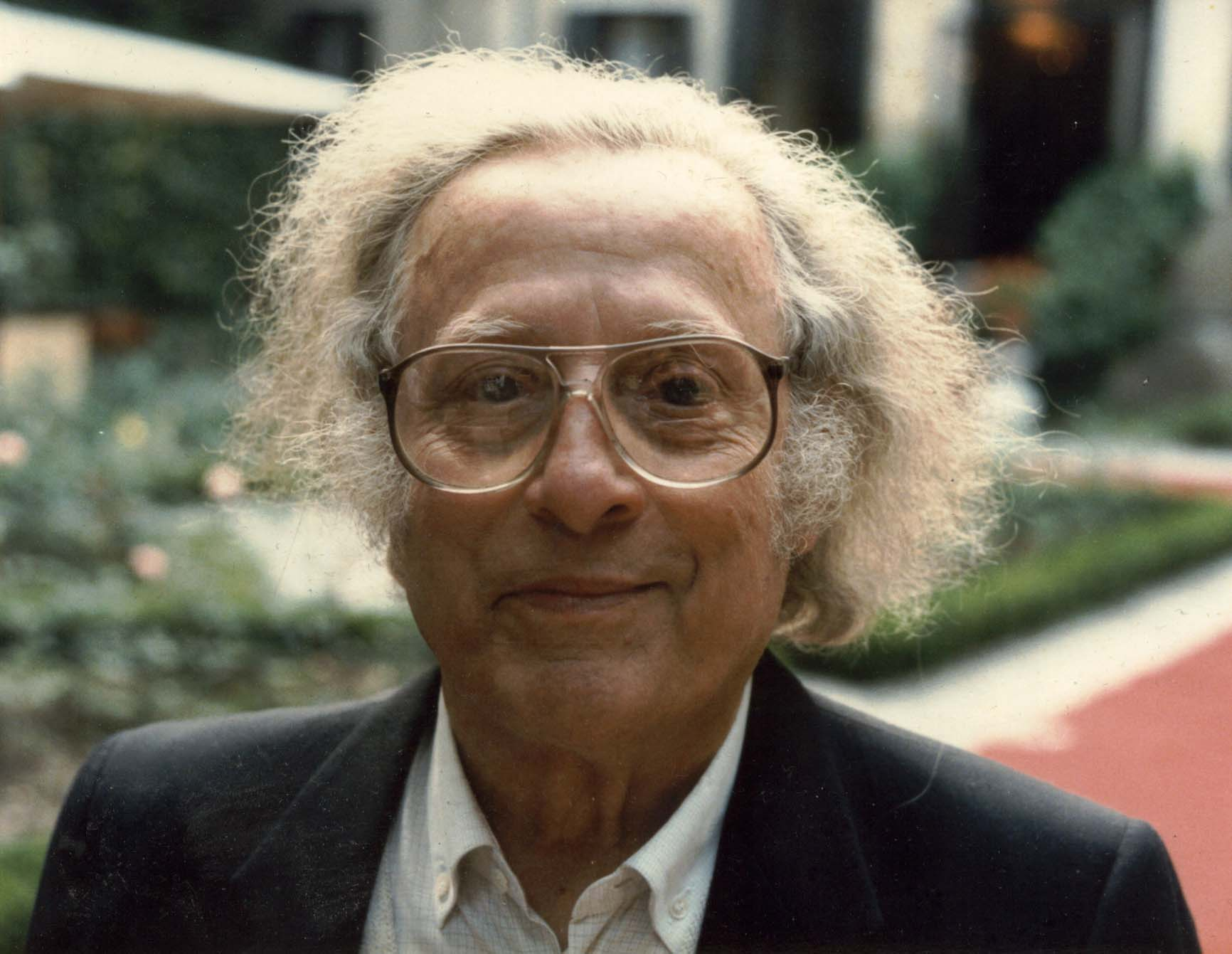
Toni Benetton, 1990

Toni Benetton (16 February 1910 in Treviso – 27 February 1996 in Treviso) was an Italian sculptor.

His work has been exhibited internationally, including at the Kunstsammlung Nordrhein-Westfalen in Düsseldorf, the Hirshhorn Museum and Sculpture Garden in Washington, D.C., the Museum Beelden aan Zee in Scheveningen, the Hakone Open-Air Museum near Tokyo and the 52nd Venice Biennale in 1986.

Toni Benetton, bought Villa Marignana in Mogliano Veneto and converted it in his residence and showroom. Part of the property was converted in artist studio. He created the Academy of Iron (Accademia del Ferro), where he organized artistic courses on blacksmithing.

His son Simon Benetton is also a sculptor.
