= Lisa Marie Thalhammer =

American artist

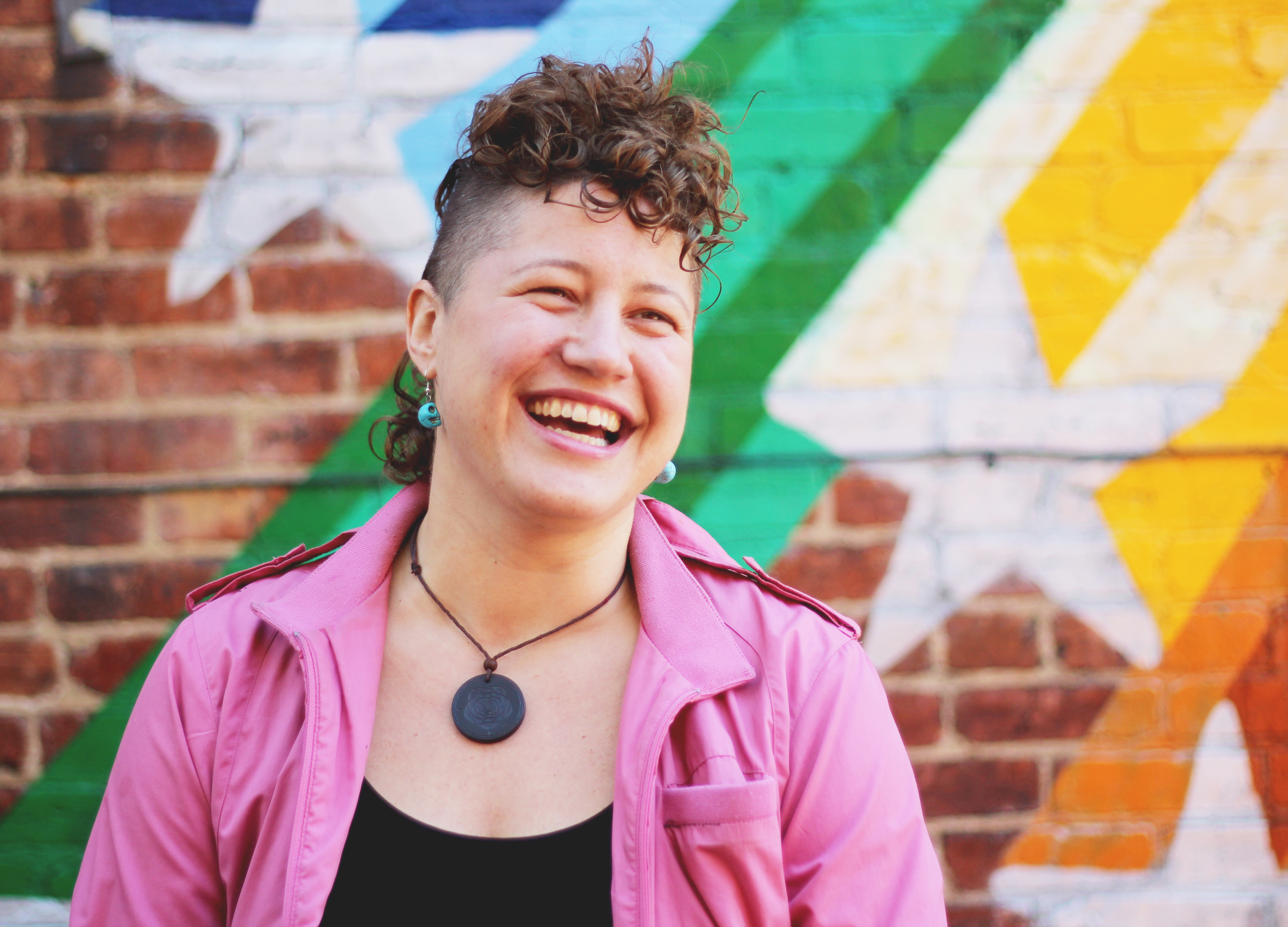
- Born: Florissant, Missouri, U.S.
- Education: University of Kansas
- Known for: Visual art, painting, murals
- Website: www.lisamariestudio.com

Lisa Marie Thalhammer is an artist living in Washington D.C.

== Education ==
Thalhammer was born in Florissant, Missouri. She first studied art at St. Joseph's Academy while working as a waitress at her family's truck stop. She attended the Art Institute of Chicago at the age of 16, for an art program that focused on figure drawing. She received, with honors, her Bachelor of Fine Arts degree in painting with a double minor in Women's Studies and Art History from the University of Kansas and studied abroad at Staffordshire University in England. She moved to Washington D.C. in 2004.

== Career ==
Thalhammer's work has been covered by publications including U.S. News & World Report, the Washington Post, and the Washington Blade. The Blade featured her on its cover in 2008 and nominated her for "best visual artist" in 2013.

Thalhammer has been influenced and inspired by Artemisia Gentileschi.

Thalhammer has exhibited her works at several galleries in Washington D.C. such as the Transformer Gallery and G-Fine Arts Gallery. In 2013, she had a solo show called Intimate Network at The Fridge Gallery in Washington, which included 13 pieces of portraiture and abstract work. In 2010, she collaborated with another Washington artist, Sheila Criter, to create a window mural at the Walter E. Washington Convention Center called Butterfly Speeches.

== Art and activism ==
Lisa Marie Thalhammer uses her artworks as part of political actions to communicate positive messages of equality, persistence, empowerment and love.

=== LOVE ===
Thalhammer's LOVE design made its debut in the 2016 Capital Pride Parade as float banners. In January 2017 Thalhammer created posters with her LOVE artwork, advocating for an end to hate while protesting the United States presidential inauguration. She has since carried her LOVE poster art in many political protests in Washington D.C. including the People's Climate March, the Native Nations March, the March For Our Lives and the Capital Pride 2017 & 2018 Parades.

In January 2018, Thalhammer's original 10 foot wide LOVE painting on paper was exhibited at Into Action, a social justice art festival in Downtown Los Angeles.

=== Strong Woman ===
As part of an organized effort of multiple artists from Washington and Los Angeles, Thalhammer used her artwork to participate in the 2017 inaugural Women's March on Washington. A racially diverse team of women carried Thalhammer's 24 foot diameter painting titled Strong Woman: LOVE for All which features a multiracial women flexing her arms wearing camouflaged pants in front of a rainbow colored background. The artwork was later displayed at the 2018 United State of Women Summit in Los Angeles, CA.

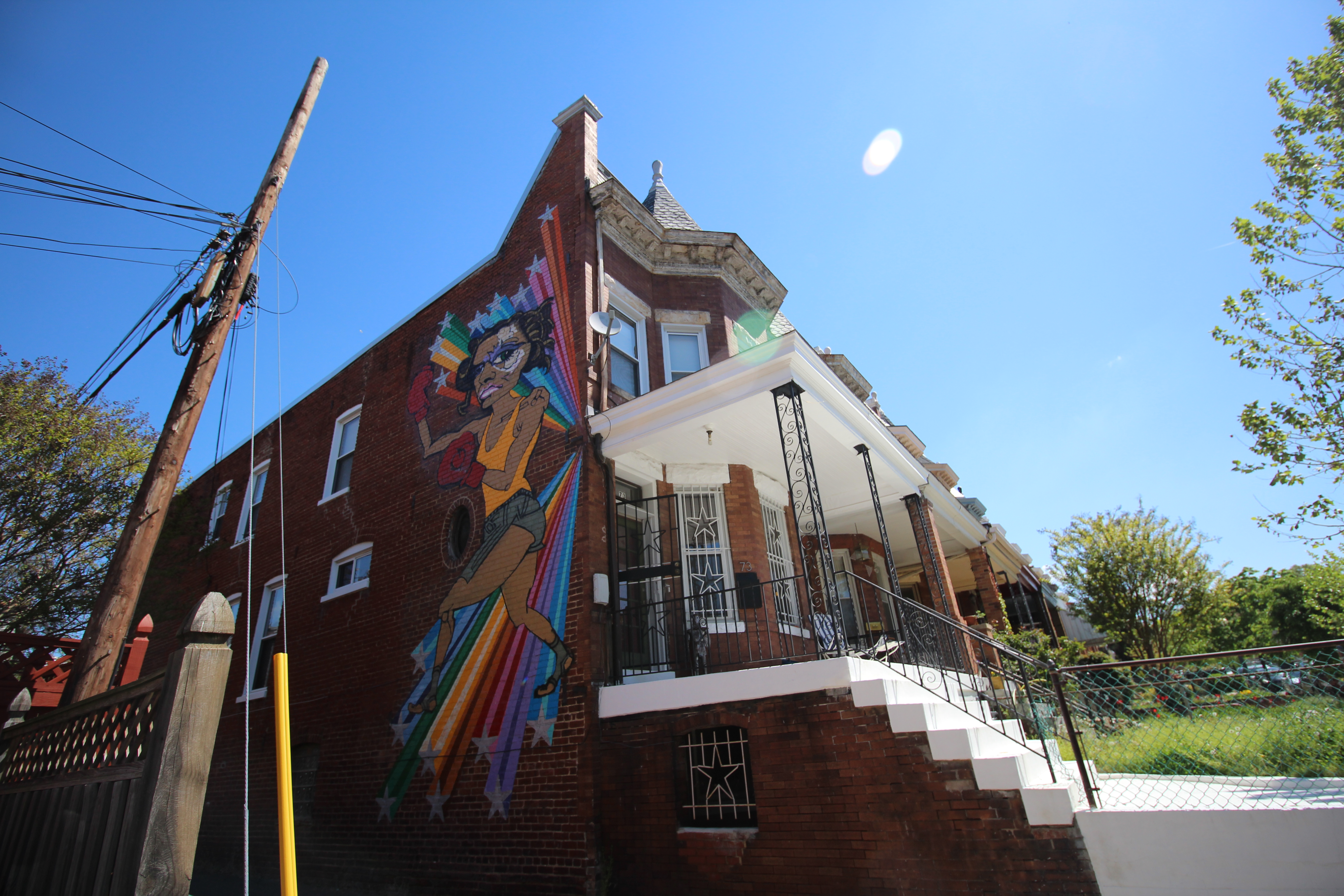
Thalhammer's Boxer Girl mural, located at 73 W Street NW, Washington D.C.

== Notable murals ==
=== Boxer Girl ===
Boxer Girl, Thalhammer's first public mural, was installed over Memorial Day weekend in 2009 and is located at 1st and W Streets NW in Washington. It was inspired by the women in Thalhammer's life and her observations of women's interactions with male peers in her community, and also by her athletic experiences and appreciation for team sports.

The mural sparked some controversy as members of the neighborhood had mixed reactions to it. In a neighborhood committee meeting, a police officer reported that after installation of the mural, crime in that area had decreased by 55 percent.

The DC Commission of Arts and Humanities awarded Thalhammer a grant to create Boxer Girl. Thalhammer decided to paint Boxer Girl in her own neighborhood, Bloomingdale, on the side of the home of a long-time supporter and friend, Veronica Jackson.

=== LOVE mural ===
Thalhammer painted her LOVE mural in the Blagden Alley Shaw neighborhood of Washington D.C. in August 2017 on four steel gates. It has since become popular among Instagram users and photographers. The mural has appeared in Washingtonian Magazine, a Destination DC Date Night commercial, and the Netflix series "Stay Here.

=== Rainbow Road ===
Thalhammer led the painting of Rainbow Road, dubbed the "longest LGBTQ+ mural in history" in May 2025 in Washington, D.C. Painted with the help of more than 120 volunteers ahead of WorldPride celebrations, the mural stretched more than half a mile in the bike lane buffer of 15th Street.

=== Mural controversy ===
In 2016 Thalhammer collaborated with fellow artist Aja Adams on the design of a mural which Thalhammer completed in summer 2017; it is located in the alley next to 57 O Street NW in Washington, D.C. The project received a $50,000 grant from the DC Commission on the Arts and Humanities. Adams was not paid the amount she expected for her contributions. In response to her complaint, the commission initially threatened to pull the grant, but later stated that it was simply a contractual disagreement.

== Involvement in the LGBTQIA+ community ==
In February 2017 the Washington Blade, covering the LGBTQIA+ Community since 1969, listed Lisa Marie Thalhammer as one of the city's "Most Eligible Singles". The Blade also nominated her "best visual artist" in 2013.

In August 2017 Thalhammer gave a eulogy at the memorial for Cassidy Karakorn, a 39-year-old executive with the LGBT civil rights advocacy group Human Rights Campaign who was killed in a traffic collision.

== Awards and honors ==
Thalhammer was voted Best Artist by the Washington Blade Reader's Choice Awards 2018.
