= DC Commission on the Arts and Humanities =

Agency of the District of Columbia government

D.C. Commission on the Arts and Humanities
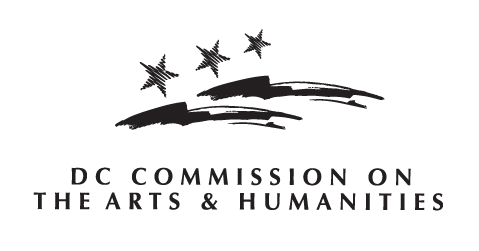
- D.C. Commission on the Arts and Humanities logo

Agency overview
- Formed: 1968; 58 years ago
- Jurisdiction: District of Columbia
- Headquarters: Washington, D.C., U.S.
- Agency executive: David Markey, Interim Executive Director
- Website: dcarts.dc.gov

The D.C. Commission on the Arts and Humanities (CAH) is an agency of the District of Columbia government. As of October 2022, the Interim Executive Director is David Markey. CAH was created as an outgrowth of the U.S. Congress Act that established the National Foundation on the Arts and Humanities of 1965. The Foundation provided for four operating federal agencies including the National Endowment for the Arts and the National Endowment for the Humanities.

CAH's office is in the Navy Yard neighborhood of southeast Washington, D.C. The current chairperson of the D.C. Commission on the Arts and Humanities is business leader and philanthropist, Reggie Van Lee and the current vice chairperson is business leader and board director, Maggie FitzPatrick. The current commissioners, appointed by Mayor Muriel Bowser and confirmed by D.C. Council, are: Stacie Lee Banks, Cora Masters Barry, Maggie FitzPatrick (Vice Chair CAH and chair, Public Arts Committee), Quanice Floyd (chair, IDEA Committee), Natalie Hopkinson, Kymber Menkiti (treasurer and chair, finance committee), Maria Hall Rooney, Carla Sims, Hector Torres (secretary and chair, Arts Education Committee), and Gretchen Wharton (chair, grants committee)

== Background ==
The DC Commission on the Arts and Humanities provides grants, professional opportunities, education enrichment, and other programs and services to individuals and nonprofit organizations in all communities within the District of Columbia. After the creation of the National Endowment for the Arts (NEA), it was mandated that the NEA provide equal block grants to the official state arts agencies in each state. If a state didn’t have an official state arts agency, it was eligible to receive money to create such an agency.

The statute paragraph in D.C. code, DC ST § 39-201, says that the D.C. Commission on the Arts and Humanities (CAH) was founded in 1975, but the National Assembly of State Art Agencies (NASAA) has legislative appropriations numbers for CAH from 1968 forward. NASAA’s State Arts Council records dated August 1968 lists the D.C. member as the Recreation Board of the District of Columbia. This board had an Arts Advisory Committee whose chairman was Gerson Nordlinger. The “Special Assistant for the Arts” was Gerald Boesgaard.

The Recreation Board of the District of Columbia was abolished in 1968. All functions of the Recreation Board were transferred to the Mayor-Commissioner of the District of Columbia, Walter E. Washington. At that time, the name changed to the D.C. Commission on the Arts, under the direction of Gerald Boesgaard. After the 1973 District of Columbia Home Rule Act, which provided for an elected mayor and 13-member Council of the District of Columbia, the agency took on its current role in the city as the D.C. Commission on the Arts and Humanities.

It appears the statutory status of the Commission changed in 1975 to take its current form. NASAA does not have the original 1968 code and their records begin with the 1975 version. In theory, CAH’s original authorization might not have been a statute. It could have been a mayor or council proclamation, rather than a chapter in D.C. code.

== Grantmaking ==
CAH offers grants in the categories of Arts Education, Community Arts, Cultural Facilities, East of the River, Festivals and City Arts, Grants-In-Aid, Individual Artists, Public Art Building Communities and UPSTART. The Commission also grants visual artists through a program called Art Bank, which purchases art and places those works in government buildings throughout the city.

== Executive directors ==
- 1969 Gerald Boesgaard
- 1976-1979 Larry Neal, appointed by Walter Washington
- 1979–1984 Mildred Bautista (from 1987, known as Millie Hallow), appointed by Marion Barry
- 1984-1986 James “Jim” Backas, appointed by Marion Barry
- 1986-1990 Barbara Nicholson, appointed by Marion Barry
- 1991-1996 Pamela G. Holt, appointed by Sharon Pratt Kelly
- 1997-2008 Anthony Gittens, appointed by Marion Barry
- 2008 Lionell Thomas (Interim)
- 2008-2010 Gloria Nauden, appointed by Adrian Fenty
- 2010-2011 Ayris Scales (Interim)
- 2011-2015 Lionell Thomas, appointed by Vincent C. Gray
- 2015 Lisa Richards Toney (Interim)
- 2015-2018 Arthur Espinoza Jr., appointed by Muriel Bowser
- 2018-2019 Terrie Rouse-Rosario, appointed by Muriel Bowser
- 2019-2022 Heran Sereke-Brhan, PhD., appointed by Muriel Bowser
- October 2022–2023 David Markey (Interim)
- 2023–present Aaron Myers, appointed by Muriel Bowser
