= Ward Parkway Center =

Shopping mall in Kansas City, Missouri

- Location: 38°58′15″N 94°36′24″W
- Address: 8600 Ward Parkway; Kansas City, Missouri 64114
- Opened: 1959
- Developer: Legacy Development
- Manager: Legacy Development
- Owner: Legacy Development
- Num. of anchor tenants: 2 Target; AMC Theatres 14
- Floor area: 800,000 square foot
- Floors: 1 (Originally 2 floors) (2nd floor interior stores: State Line Level); (1st floor exterior stores: Ward Parkway Level)
- Parking: Parking lot
- Public transit: RideKC
- Website: Official Website

Ward Parkway Center, Ward Parkway Mall, or Ward Parkway Shopping Center is a shopping center located in Kansas City, Missouri on the Kansas/Missouri border line. The location surrounds the area on the North from 85th Terrace to 89th Street on the South and on the West from State Line Road to Ward Parkway on the East. Once a two floor mall with a food court it now has one floor with the first floor enclosed. The mall itself is currently in a redevelopment phase and has been in business since 1959. Former stores Sam Goody, Gap, TGI Friday's, The Limited, and Winstead's. Ward Parkway Center is the location of the first modern movie multiplex, with its original two screens (since renovated and expanded to 14 screens) still operated by AMC Theatres. Originally a tiny two-screen theater located near Montgomery Ward, later expanded to the new complex.

== Today ==
Ward Parkway Center has been updated inside and out with evidence of more foot traffic despite expansion development and some empty storefronts.

Ward Parkway Center is set to develop the former Dillard's site — six years after the department store closed. In 2016, plans were approved for a 31,000-square-foot, U-shaped addition with six restaurant tenants and a pedestrian plaza, all on south end of the center. The tenants include Smitty's Garage, Torchy's Tacos, Charleston's Restaurant, Hawaiian Bros, and Hurts Donuts. The two middle buildings were expanded into 18,000 square feet with smaller tenants on either side. Buildings on the north and south end of the addition include patios.

Chick-fil-A has a pad site outside of Target fronting State Line Road.

In June 2023, Peter Piper Pizzeria, a fast-casual version of Peter Piper Pizza, opened at Ward Parkway Center, taking over the space of Hurts Donuts. Peter Piper Pizzeria would close in June 2024, with a Chuck E. Cheese opening at the space in August 2024.

== Anchor Tenants ==
- Target - replaces Montgomery Ward in a new building at the same location
- AMC Ward Parkway 14 Theatres - renovated with leather seats and bar.

== Competition ==
- Bannister Mall - opened 1980, demolished 2009
- Country Club Plaza
- Oak Park Mall - opened 1975
- Waldo
- Metcalf South Shopping Center - opened 1967, demolished in 2017
- Prairie Village Shopping Center
- Independence Center - opened 1974
- Blue Ridge Mall - opened 1957, demolished 2005, replaced with Blue Ridge Crossing at the same site
