= Joe Shannon (politician) =

American politician (1867–1943)

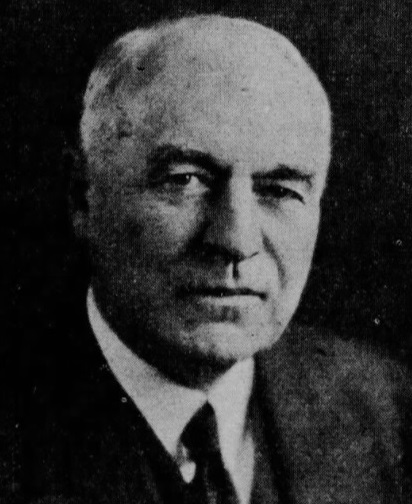

Member of the U.S. House of Representatives from Missouri's 5th district
- In office March 4, 1931 – January 3, 1943
- Preceded by: Edgar C. Ellis
- Succeeded by: Roger C. Slaughter

Personal details
- Born: March 17, 1867 St. Louis, Missouri, U.S.
- Died: March 28, 1943 (aged 76) Kansas City, Missouri, U.S.
- Resting place: Calvary Cemetery; Kansas City, Missouri, U.S.
- Party: Democratic
- Spouse: Celia J. Hutawa (m. 1892)
- Children: 2

Joseph Bernard Shannon (March 17, 1867 – March 28, 1943) was an American politician. A Democratic political boss in Kansas City, Missouri, he was a rival to the more dominant James Pendergast political machine in the late 19th and the early 20th centuries.

== Early life ==
Joseph Bernard Shannon was born on March 17, 1867, in St. Louis, Missouri, and moved in his youth to Girard, Kansas. His father died in Girard from an accident. He moved to Kansas City, Missouri, in 1879 where he was a constable and a city-market master, and he attended night school at Central High School and Spalding Business College. He studied law, was admitted to the bar in 1905.

== Career ==
Shannon began to practice law in Kansas City.

His faction was called the "rabbits" because its power base derived from those who lived along the Missouri River and the Kansas River. His rival were the "goats" and derived power from those living in the hills of Kansas City and was headed by James Pendergast and upon his retirement sometime in 1910, his brother Tom Pendergast. Shannon and the Pendergasts were all members of the Democratic Party but frequently clashed in local elections, either directly or through supported candidates on issues such as Prohibition, the influence of saloon-owners in local politics, and the Democratic Party's nominee for Kansas City's mayoral and alderman races.

The "rabbits" and the "goats" shared control over the Kansas City Democrats in an agreement they called "Fifty-Fifty": each faction would nominate half of the Democratic candidates for local offices. If there was disagreement between the factions as to whose candidate should run in an office, they would each nominate a candidate for the primary election and then respect the results of the vote. This scheme allowed the "goats" and "rabbits" to maintain relatively equal control over the Kansas City Democrats until Shannon's faction was relegated to a minor role after Pendergast successfully urged his followers to vote against Democratic candidates that were not backed by his political machine in the 1916 Kansas City local elections; going as far as openly supporting Nonpartisan candidates for alderman and council positions. Pendergast-backed candidates won five city council seats, with Republicans winning the remainder. This result confirmed that Pendergast's faction had control over the party's future.

Shannon was chairman of the Democratic State Convention in 1910; delegate to the Democratic National Conventions in 1908, 1912, 1920, 1924, 1928, 1932, and 1940; and member of the Missouri Constitutional Conventions in 1922 and 1923. He was elected as a Democrat to the U.S. House of Representatives, serving from March 4, 1931, to January 3, 1943. Shannon was known as a scholar of Thomas Jefferson and would speak about his life and his teachings.

== Personal life ==
Shannon married Celia J. Hutawa on November 22, 1892. They had two children, Frank and Mrs. John F. Deveney.

Shannon died on March 28, 1943, in Kansas City following a heart ailment and pneumonia. He is buried in Calvary Cemetery in Kansas City.

U.S. House of Representatives
Preceded by Edgar C. Ellis	Member of the U.S. House of Representatives from Missouri's 5th congressional district 1931-1943	Succeeded by Roger C. Slaughter
