= Monroe Hotel =

- U.S. National Register of Historic Places
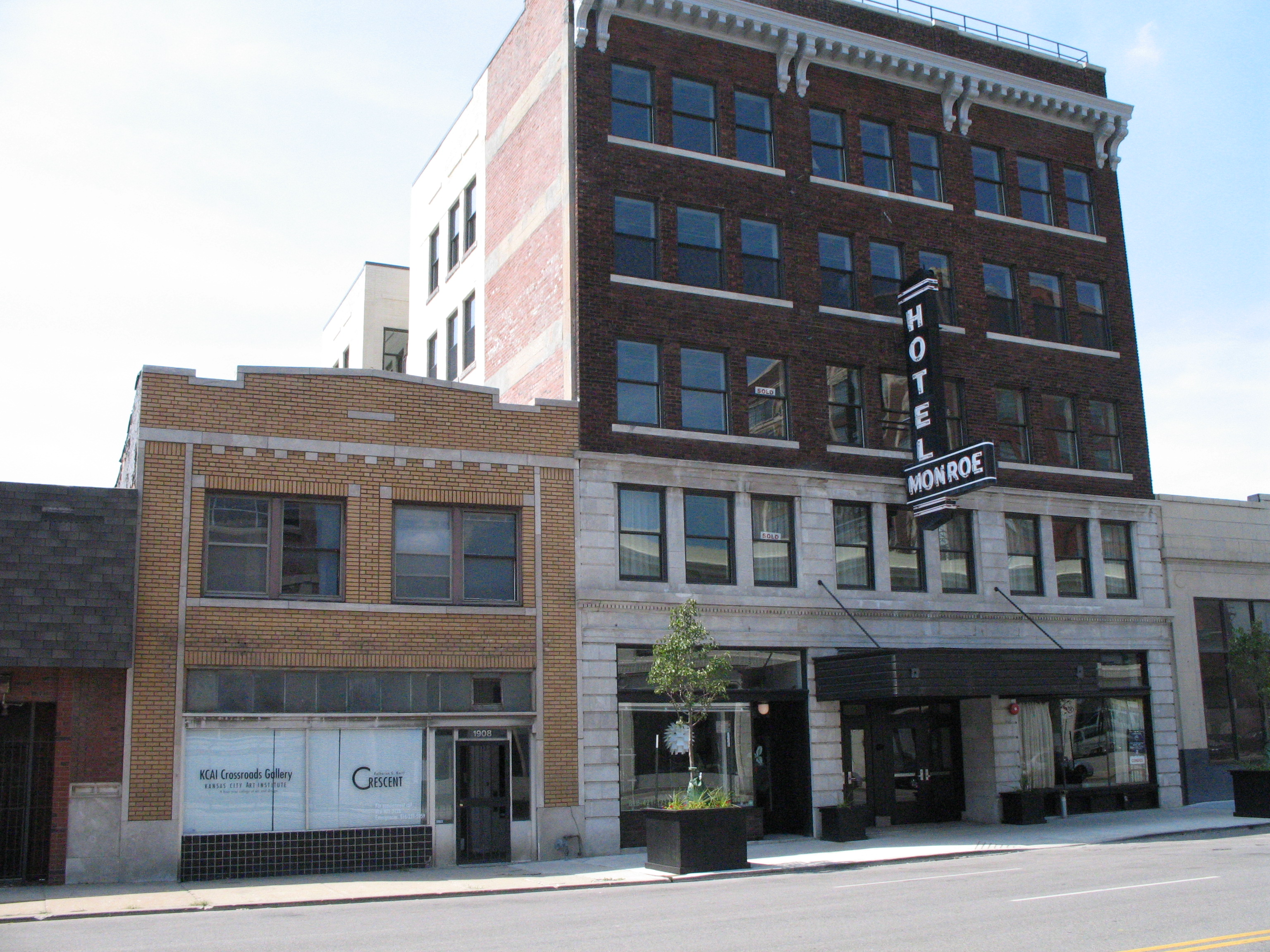
- The Monroe Hotel to the right with the office at 1908 Main to the left

- Location within Missouri Location within the United States
- Location: 1904-06 Main St., Kansas City, Missouri
- Coordinates: 39°5′30″N 94°35′2″W
- Built: 1920; 106 years ago
- Architect: Sanneman, R.H.; Edelman-Fleming Construction Co
- Architectural style: Early Commercial
- MPS: Working class hotels at 19th and Main St, Kansas City, Missouri MPS
- NRHP reference No.: 04000395
- Added to NRHP: 6 May 2004

The Monroe Hotel was a hotel in Kansas City, Missouri. It was built in the early 1920s and soon afterward bought by Tom Pendergast, a local political boss, who arranged for connecting access between his office and the hotel. The hotel closed in 1971, and the building was later converted to condominium use.

== History ==
The need for affordable working class hotel space south of downtown came about as the result of the completion of Union Station in 1914. Raymond H. Sanneman designed the Monroe Hotel in 1920 for the Dubinsky Brothers, and Elelman-Fleming Construction Company served as the general contractor. The five-story hotel was constructed of reinforced concrete with brick and terra cotta at an estimated cost of $150,000.

=== Ownership by Thomas J. Pendergast ===
Political boss Thomas J. Pendergast purchased the Monroe Hotel in 1924, and he hired Sanneman to design a two-story building adjacent to the south side of the hotel that would serve as the headquarters for his Jackson County Democratic Club. Pendergast operated out of the two-story building at 1908 Main until the late 1930s. Pendergast had a doorway installed between his second floor office and the hotel, giving him a clandestine entry point and access to the hotel's elevator. After Pendergast's release from prison for income tax evasion, a Federal Court ordered the doorway to be sealed and barred Pendergast from any further political activity. The hotel closed its doors in 1971.

=== Redevelopment ===
After sitting vacant for more than 30 years, renovation to the Monroe Hotel was completed in mid-2006, by the Kansas City designer Benjamin Sundermeier. The hotel is now home to 8 luxury condominiums. The condos range in size from 1,930 to 2500 sq. ft.
