= Ward Parkway =

Large boulevard in Kansas City, Missouri

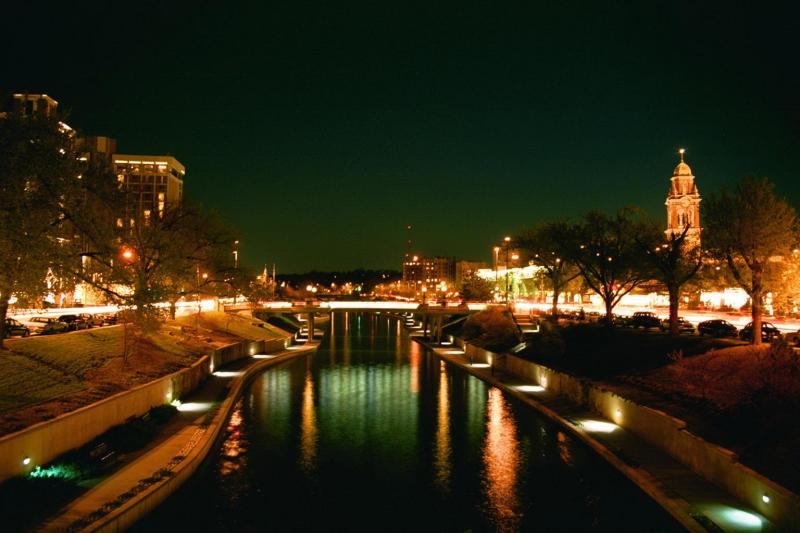
- Ward Parkway, split by Brush Creek in the Country Club Plaza near its eastern terminus
- Interactive map of Ward Parkway
- Namesake: Hugh Campbell Ward, son of Seth E. Ward
- Type: boulevard
- Length: 6.8 mi (10.9 km)
- Coordinates: 39°0′0.2″N 94°36′11.9″W
- North: Brookside Boulevard / Volker Boulevard
- South: Wornall Road

Other
- Known for: High-class neighborhoods, redlining, fountains

Ward Parkway
- Type: Boulevard median greenspace
- Location: Kansas City, Missouri, United States
- Coordinates: 39.032181°N 94.605669°W
- Area: 211.14 acres (0.8545 km^{2}; 0.32991 mi^{2})
- Designer: J.C. Nichols
- Owner: City of Kansas City, Missouri
- Website: kcparks.org

Ward Parkway is a boulevard in Kansas City, Missouri, United States. Ward Parkway begins at Brookside Boulevard on the eastern edge of the Country Club Plaza and travels west 2.8 miles along Brush Creek as U.S. Route 56 before turning south near Kansas-Missouri state line. It continues south for 4 miles, terminating at Wornall Road near Bannister Road. A short spur, Brush Creek Parkway, connects Ward Parkway to Shawnee Mission Parkway at State Line Road.

U.S. Route 56 follows Ward Parkway for 0.7 miles along Brush Creek between Roanoke Parkway at the western edge of the Country Club Plaza and its southward bend at Brush Creek Parkway.

The street is named after the family of local businessman and real estate tycoon Seth E. Ward (1820–1903), who owned property on both sides of the parkway. His family's mansion is located at 1032 West 55th Street along Ward Parkway and remains on the National Register of Historic Places.

Ward Parkway has a wide, landscaped median, which is decorated with fountains and statuary. Many of Kansas City's finest large houses are along Ward Parkway as part of the planned Country Club District.

== Location ==
- Northern terminus: Brookside Blvd./Volker Blvd. 39°02′22″N 94°35′07″W
- Southern terminus: Wornall Road 38°57′33″N 94°35′44″W

== History ==
Ward Parkway was created as part of developer J.C. Nichols's overall plans for the Country Club District. Desiring a boulevard that would exceed the aesthetic value of all other streets in Kansas City, Nichols hired landscape architect George Kessler, who had designed several other boulevards, parks, and neighborhoods throughout Kansas City, Missouri, including Hyde Park. The street was named after prominent Kansas City attorney Hugh Campbell Ward (1864–1909), a business partner of J.C. Nichols who donated his family property to the city. Though he died before the papers were signed, his wife, Vassie James Ward, followed his will.

As Nichols platted the district, beginning in 1906, he reserved space for Ward Parkway. The largest lots in the district were reserved for houses to be built along the boulevard. The Kansas City Parks Department added Ward Parkway into its formal boulevard system. Nichols traveled to Italy and England to buy statues and monuments to place in the boulevard's wide median. He also placed ponds and decorative urns throughout the parkway's length. To promote his development, Nichols periodically placed photographs of the large houses being built along Ward Parkway in Sunday editions of the Kansas City Star. Nichols even moved into a house on this new development.

Shortly following establishment of the U.S. Highway System, U.S. Route 50 was drawn concurrent to the section of Ward Parkway between Southwest Trafficway and State Line Road. Following many years of discussion, U.S. Route 56 additionally serviced this section of Ward Parkway beginning in 1957, with U.S. Route 50 being moved concurrent with Interstate 435 and Interstate 470 following the latter's completion in 1979. This half-mile section of Ward Parkway is maintained as U.S. Route 56 to the present day.

Some of the most prominent Kansas City families chose to build their homes on Ward Parkway (notable examples include Tom Pendergast House, Bernard Corrigan House, and Mack B. Nelson House). By the time Evan S. Connell wrote Mrs. Bridge in 1959, the proximity of a prominent Kansas Citian's house to Ward Parkway was seen as an indication of that person's place in Kansas City society. Continuing to today, the perceived social capital associated with living in proximity to Ward Parkway has made it home to a disproportionate number of Kansas City's wealthiest, most educated, and healthiest residents.

In 2012, Ward Parkway was named a Great Street in the American Planning Association's annual list of Great Places in America, citing that the passion “by both citizens and city government to maintain the parkway has allowed it to remain one of the area's most coveted addresses with historic homes, neighborhood parks, picturesque fountains, ornamental monuments, and rolling landscapes.”

== Improvement and Preservation ==
The Ward Parkway Center Community Improvement District, the area contained by W 85th Terrace, Ward Parkway, W 89th Street, and State Line Road, was created in 2011 to allow the city to levy a one percent sales tax to help fund parkway projects and redevelop the area. One project that benefited from the District is the Ward Parkway Center, a large indoor shopping center near the southern end of the parkway. In addition, the city allocated more than $9 million for the maintenance and improvements of park grounds, fountains and monuments, and recreational facilities along parkways.

Several sites and buildings along Ward Parkway are designated as National Historic Sites and are listed on the National Register of Historic Places. These include the Park Manor Historic District at 910-920 Ward Parkway; the Serena Apartment Hotel, a nine-story Italian Renaissance Revival Villa, and the Alexander Majors Antebellum house at West 83rd. In 1996, design guidelines for building along the parkway were adopted, and new construction on the parkway requires a certificate from the Historic Preservation Committee.

== Points of interest ==
- Kansas City Public Library Plaza Branch, located at 4801 Main Street near the intersection of Ward Parkway and Brookside Boulevard
- Country Club Plaza shopping center, located to the north of Ward Parkway between Baltimore Avenue and Roanoke Parkway
- InterContinental Kansas City at the Plaza, located at 401 Ward Parkway
- The Pembroke Hill School Ward Parkway Campus, located at 5121 State Line Road along Ward Parkway
- The Carriage Club, located along Ward Parkway between Brush Creek Boulevard/Shawnee Mission Parkway and 55th Street.
- Mirror Pool Fountain, located within the Ward Parkway median between W 61st Terrace and W 62nd Street.
- The Meyer Circle Sea Horse Fountain, featuring a 17-century Venetian sculpture, located at the intersection of Ward Parkway and Meyer Boulevard
- Alexander Majors Historic Museum and Barn, a building on the National Register of Historic Places, located at 8145 State Line Road at Ward Parkway and West 83rd Street.
- Ward Parkway Center, located at 8600 Ward Parkway
- Burns & McDonnell, an architecture and engineering firm, is headquartered at 9450 Ward Parkway

== Notable residents of houses along Ward Parkway ==
- Tom Pendergast, political boss
- Keith A. Tucker, former CEO of Waddell & Reed mutual fund company
- Peter Brown, CEO and co-founder of AMC Theatres.
- Jason Kander, politician
- Richard Bloch, co-founder of H&R Block

== See also ==
- Country Club District
- Mission Hills, Kansas
- Ward Parkway Center
- List of neighborhoods in Kansas City, Missouri
