= Kansas City Union Station =

Historic train station in Kansas City

Union Station Kansas City, MO
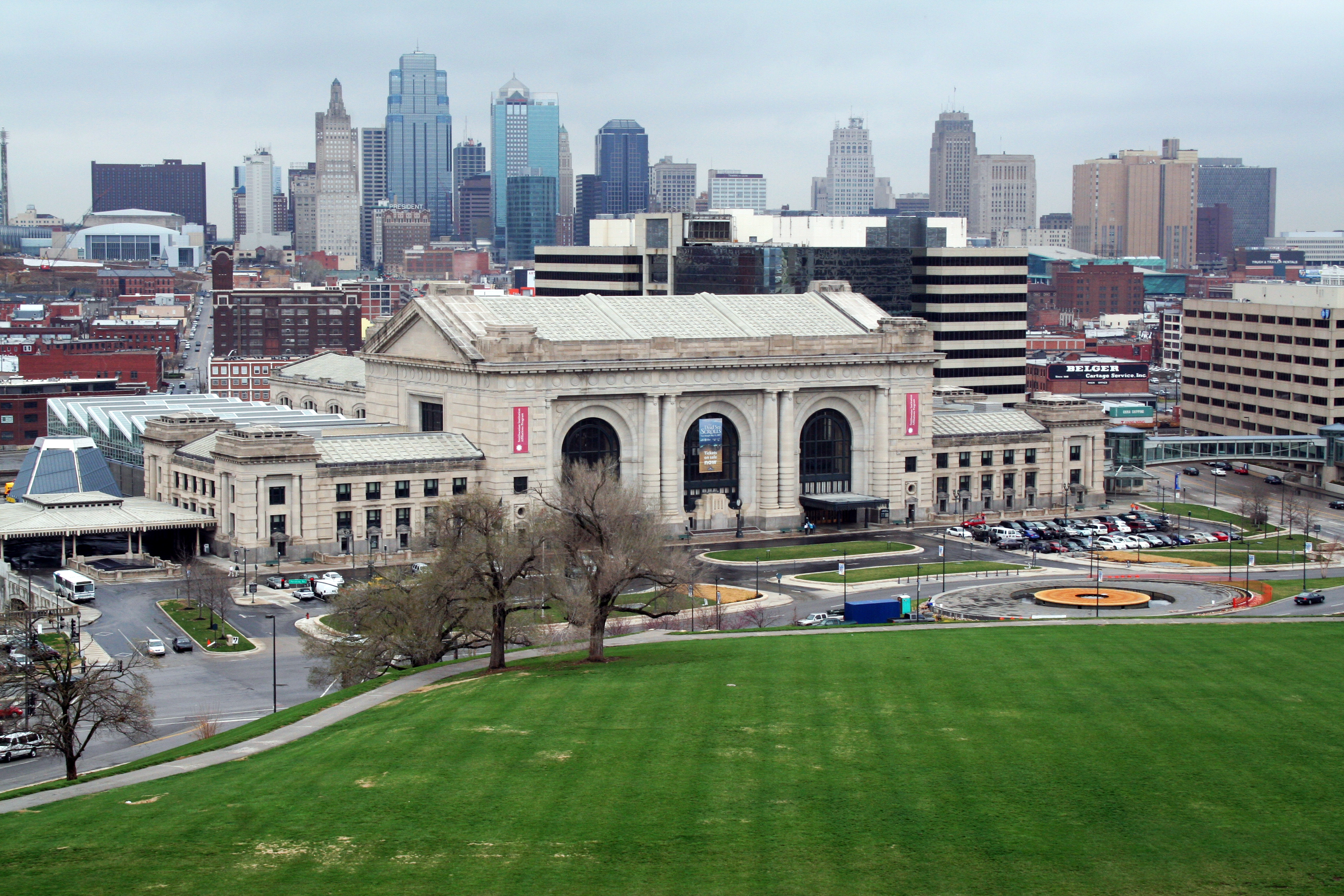

General information
- Location: 30 West Pershing Road; Kansas City, Missouri
- Coordinates: 39.0848°N 94.5853°W
- Owner: Union Station Assistance Corporation
- Line: Kansas City Terminal Railway
- Platforms: 1 island platform
- Tracks: 4

Construction
- Parking: Yes
- Accessible: Yes

Other information
- Station code: Amtrak: KCY
- Website: unionstation.org

History
- Opened: October 30, 1914; 111 years ago
- Closed: 1983 (except Amtrak Bubble) 1985 (Entire station closed)
- Rebuilt: November 10, 1999 (with Science City); 2002 (Amtrak service resumed)
- Former names: Union Depot (April 8, 1878–October 31, 1914), West Bottoms

Passengers
- FY 2025: 164,809 (Amtrak)

Services
Preceding station	Amtrak	Following station
Terminus	Missouri River Runner	Independence toward St. Louis
Lawrence toward Los Angeles	Southwest Chief	La Plata toward Chicago
Preceding station	KC Streetcar	Following station
WWI Museum & Memorial toward Riverfront	KC Streetcar	Crossroads toward UMKC
Former services
Preceding station	Amtrak	Following station
Lawrence toward Dallas or Houston	Lone Star	Carrollton toward Chicago
Terminus	National Limited	Warrensburg toward New York or Washington, D.C.
Preceding station	Alton Railroad	Following station
Terminus	Kansas City – St. Louis	Independence toward St. Louis
Preceding station	Atchison, Topeka and Santa Fe Railway	Following station
Kansas City, Kansas toward Los Angeles	Main Line	Sheffield toward Chicago
Preceding station	Burlington Route	Following station
Terminus	Kansas City – Galesburg	North Kansas City toward Galesburg
Parkville, MO toward Omaha	Omaha – Kansas City	Terminus
Terminus	Kansas City – St. Louis	North Kansas City toward St. Louis
Terminus	Kansas City – Quincy	North Kansas City toward Quincy
Preceding station	Chicago Great Western Railway	Following station
Terminus	Main Line	Bee Creek toward Minneapolis
Preceding station	Chicago, Rock Island and Pacific Railroad	Following station
North Topeka toward Teague	Teague – Minneapolis	Harlem toward Minneapolis
North Topeka toward Tucumcari	Tucumcari – Rock Island	Harlem toward Rock Island
Kansas City, Kansas toward Belleville	Kansas City – Belleville	Terminus
Terminus	Kansas City – St. Louis	Sheffield toward St. Louis
Preceding station	St. Louis–San Francisco Railway	Following station
Terminus	Kansas City – Birmingham	Rosedale toward Birmingham
Preceding station	Kansas City Southern Railway	Following station
Terminus	Main Line	Grandview toward Port Arthur
Preceding station	Milwaukee Road	Following station
Terminus	Kansas City – Savanna	Liberty toward Savanna
Preceding station	Missouri–Kansas–Texas Railroad	Following station
Terminus	Kansas City – Parsons	Paola toward Parsons
Preceding station	Missouri Pacific Railroad	Following station
Terminus	Main Line	Independence toward St. Louis
Centropolis toward Pueblo	Pueblo – Kansas City	Terminus
Pomeroy toward Omaha	Omaha – Kansas City	Terminus
Preceding station	Union Pacific Railroad	Following station
Topeka toward Denver	Kansas Pacific Railway	Terminus
Preceding station	Wabash Railroad	Following station
Terminus	Main Line	North Kansas City toward Chicago
- Union Station
- U.S. National Register of Historic Places
- Interactive map of Union Station
- Location: Pershing Rd. and Main St., Kansas City, Missouri
- Area: 20.2 acres (8.2 ha)
- Built: 1901
- Architect: Jarvis Hunt
- Architectural style: Beaux-Arts
- NRHP reference No.: 72000719
- Added to NRHP: February 1, 1972
Location

Kansas City Union Station (station code: KCY) is a union station that opened in 1914, serving Kansas City, Missouri, and the surrounding metropolitan area. It replaced a small Union Depot built in 1878. Union Station served a peak annual traffic of more than 670,000 passengers in 1945 at the end of World War II, but traffic quickly declined in the 1950s, and the station was closed in 1985.

In 1996, a public–private partnership undertook a $250 million restoration, funded in part by a sales tax levied in Kansas and Missouri counties of the Kansas City metropolitan area. By 1999, the station had reopened as a suite of attractions, including museums. In 2002, train service returned when Amtrak began public transportation services, and the station became Missouri's second-busiest train station. The refurbished station has theaters, ongoing museum exhibits, and attractions such as Science City, the Irish Museum and Cultural Center, and the Todd Bolender Center for Dance and Creativity. Since 2016, it has been a stop for the KC Streetcar.

== History ==
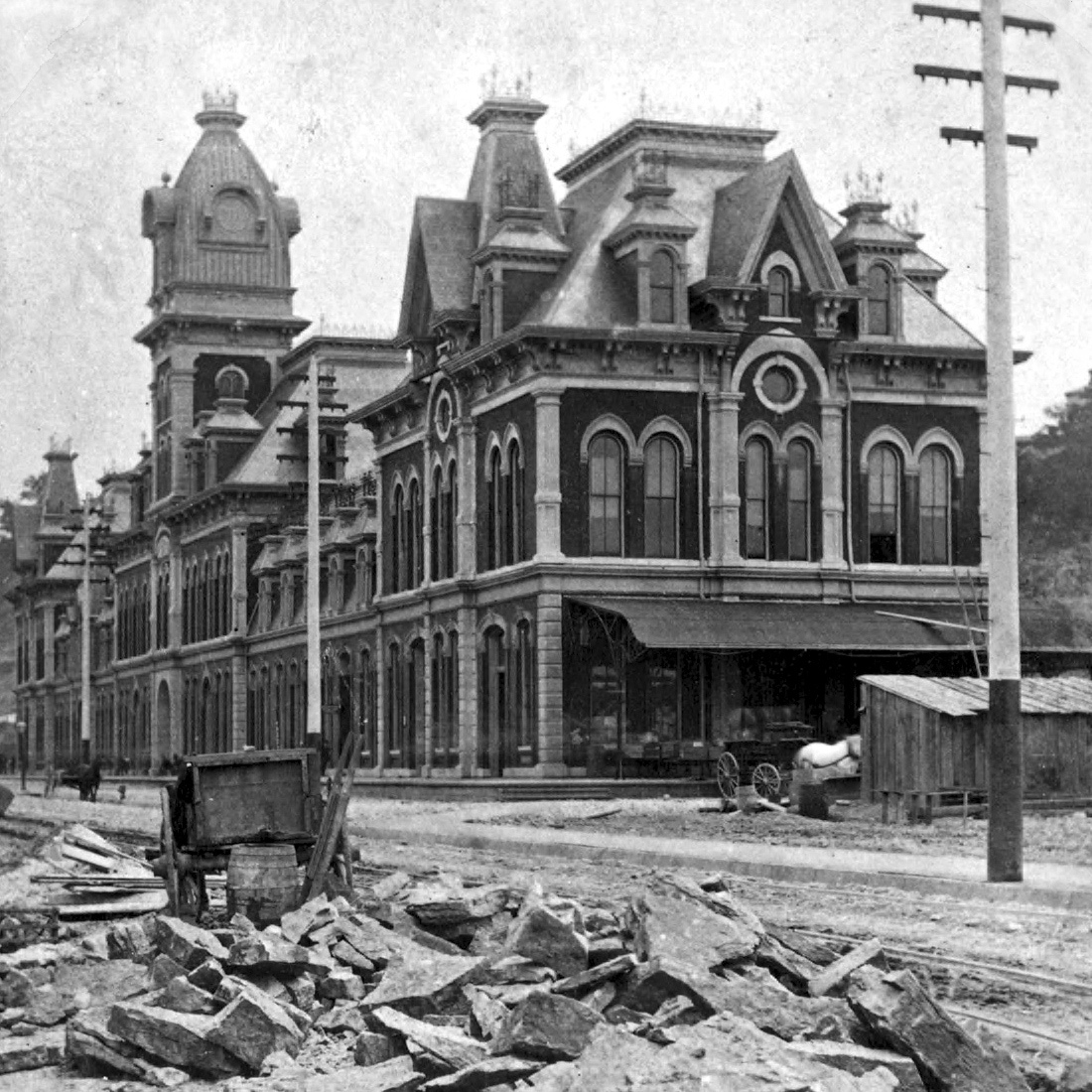
Union Depot, c. 1880

=== Union Depot era ===
On April 8, 1878, Union Depot opened on a narrow triangle of land in Kansas City, Missouri, between Union Avenue and the railroad tracks of the Hannibal and St. Joseph Railroad in what became West Bottoms. Nicknamed the "Jackson County Insane Asylum" by those who thought it was too large. It was the second union station in the country, after the Indianapolis Union Station. Union Depot's architecture was a hybrid of Second Empire and Gothic Revival. The lead architect was Asa Beebe Cross, who "adorned the exterior of the building with intricate towers of varying heights, arched windows framed in stone and rows of dormers projecting from the steeply pitched mansard roof". It had a clock tower above the main entrance that was 125 feet (38 m) in height. By the 20th century, over 180 trains were passing daily through the station, serving a city population that had tripled. In 1903, the lack of room for expansion and a major flood led the city and the railroads to decide a new station was required.

=== Union Station era ===
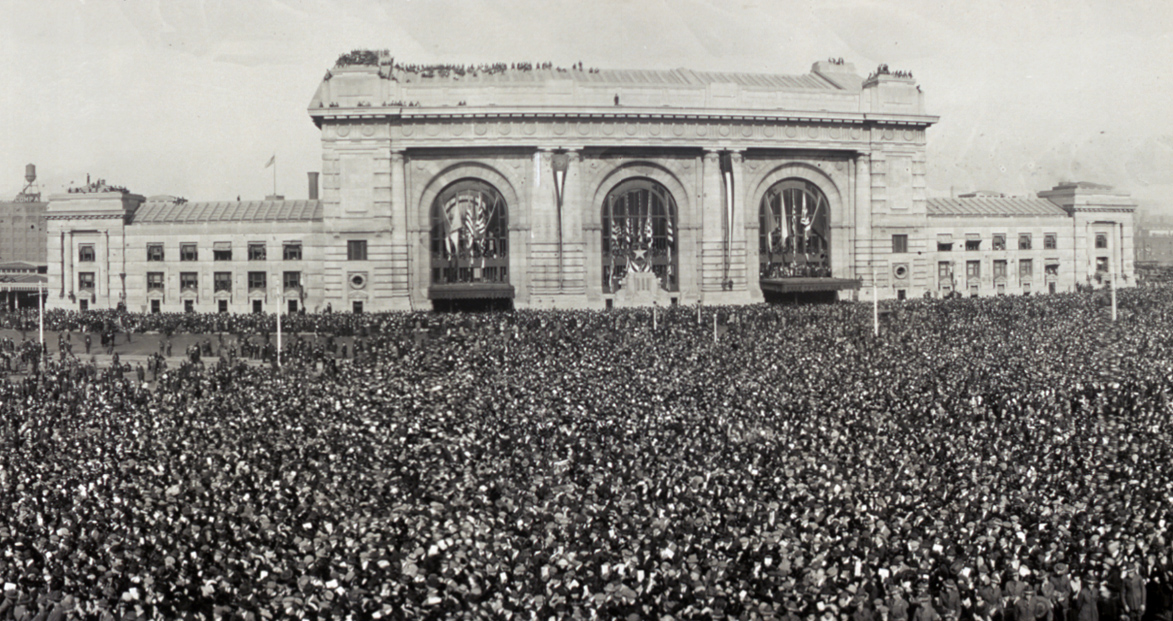
A large crowd gathered in front of Union Station for the 1921 dedication of the Liberty Memorial site.

The decision to build a new station was spearheaded by the Kansas City Terminal Railway, a switching and terminal railroad that was a joint operation of several railroads: Alton; Atchison, Topeka and Santa Fe; Chicago, Burlington and Quincy; Chicago Great Western; Chicago, Milwaukee, St. Paul and Pacific; Chicago, Rock Island and Pacific; Kansas City Southern; Missouri-Kansas-Texas; Missouri Pacific; St. Louis-San Francisco; Union Pacific; and Wabash.

The new location was at a valley at 25th Street and Grand Avenue used by the Kansas City Belt Railway. It was south of the central business district, above and away from the floodplain. Architect Jarvis Hunt was a proponent of the City Beautiful movement. The Beaux-Arts architecture design was a main hall for ticketing, and a perpendicular hall extending out above the tracks for passenger waiting. The building encompassed 850,000 square feet (79,000 m^{2}) and the ceiling in the Grand Hall is 95 feet (29 m) high. There are three chandeliers weighing 3,500 pounds (1600 kg) each, and the Grand Hall clock face is 6 feet (1.8 m) in diameter. The building's scale reflects Kansas City's central location as a hub for both passenger and freight rail traffic.

The station opened on October 30, 1914, as the third-largest train station in the country.

=== Kansas City massacre ===
The Kansas City massacre occurred on June 17, 1933, in front of Union Station, while captured fugitive Frank Nash was to be delivered to prison via train. Four lawmen (including FBI) were murdered by the Kansas City crime family with Thompson submachine guns in an attempt to free Nash, who was also killed in the gun battle. The massacre highlighted the lawlessness of Kansas City under the Pendergast Machine and resulted in the arming of all FBI agents.

=== Decline of train traffic ===
In 1945, annual passenger traffic peaked at 678,363. The demand for a large train station declined in the 1950s. In 1973, it had 32,842 passengers, all passenger train service was now run by Amtrak, and the building was deteriorating. Kansas City government wanted to preserve and redevelop the building, and, in 1974, made a development deal with Canadian redeveloper Trizec Corporation. Between 1979 and 1986, Trizec constructed two office buildings on surrounding property, but did not redevelop the station. The deteriorating station closed in 1983, except a "bubble" inside the main hall housing Amtrak's operations until 1985, when all passenger operations were moved to a smaller "Amshack" facility adjacent to the old station. In 1988, the city sued Trizec for the failure to develop the station and settled in 1994. For most of this period, the building continued to decay.

=== Restoration ===
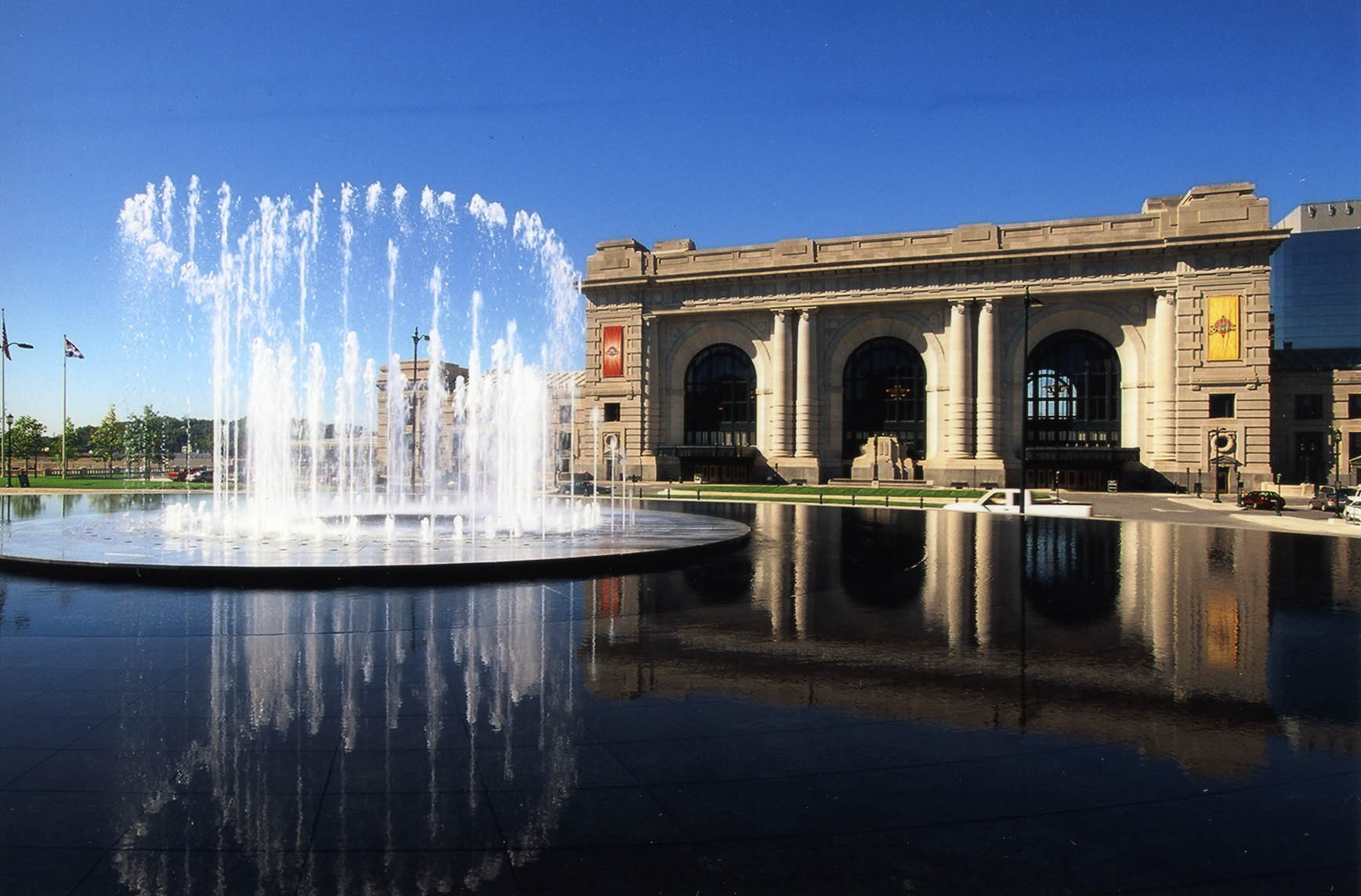
Fountains are in the street in front of Union Station (2012).

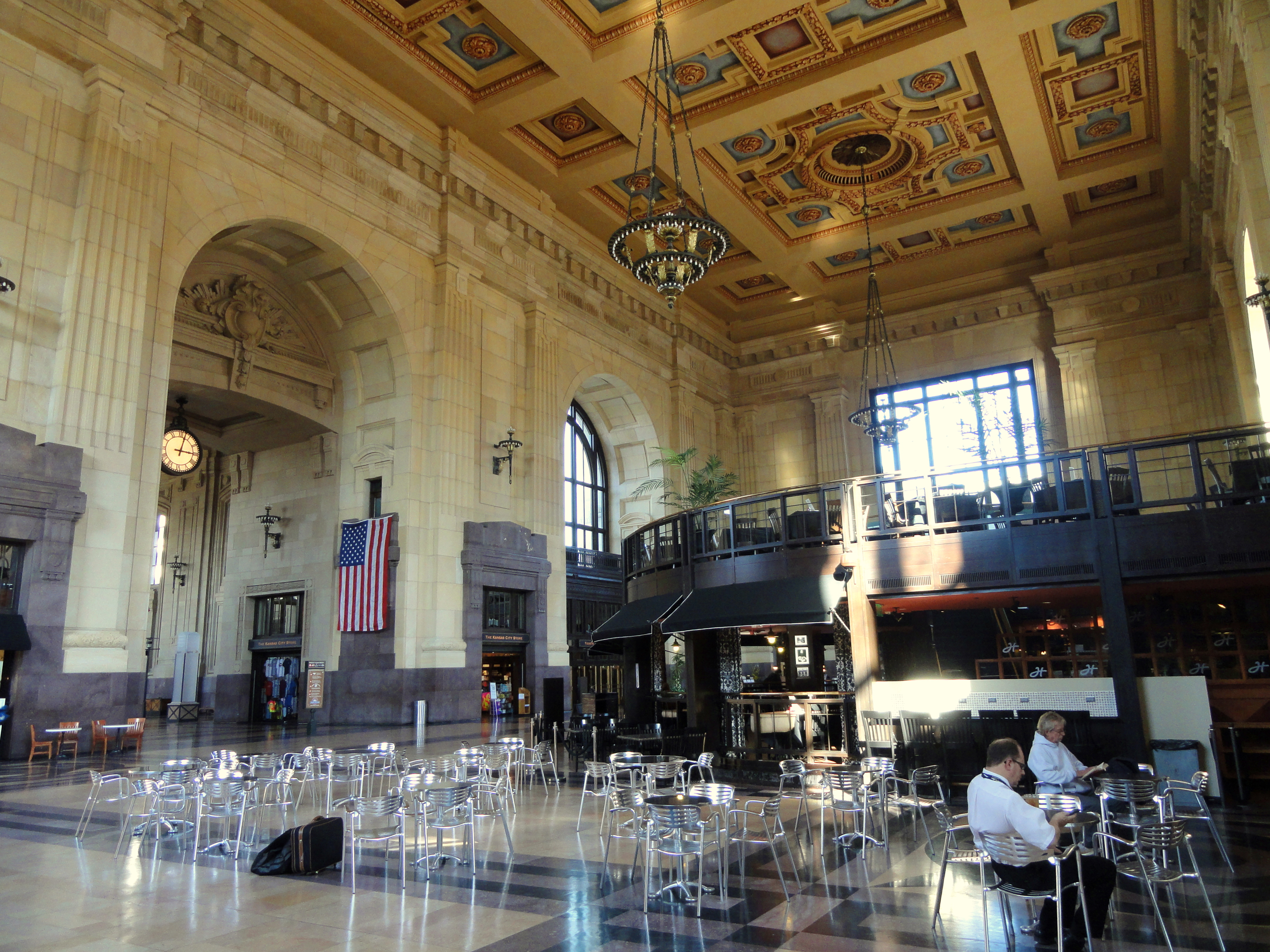
The Grand Hall is inside the entrance (2011).

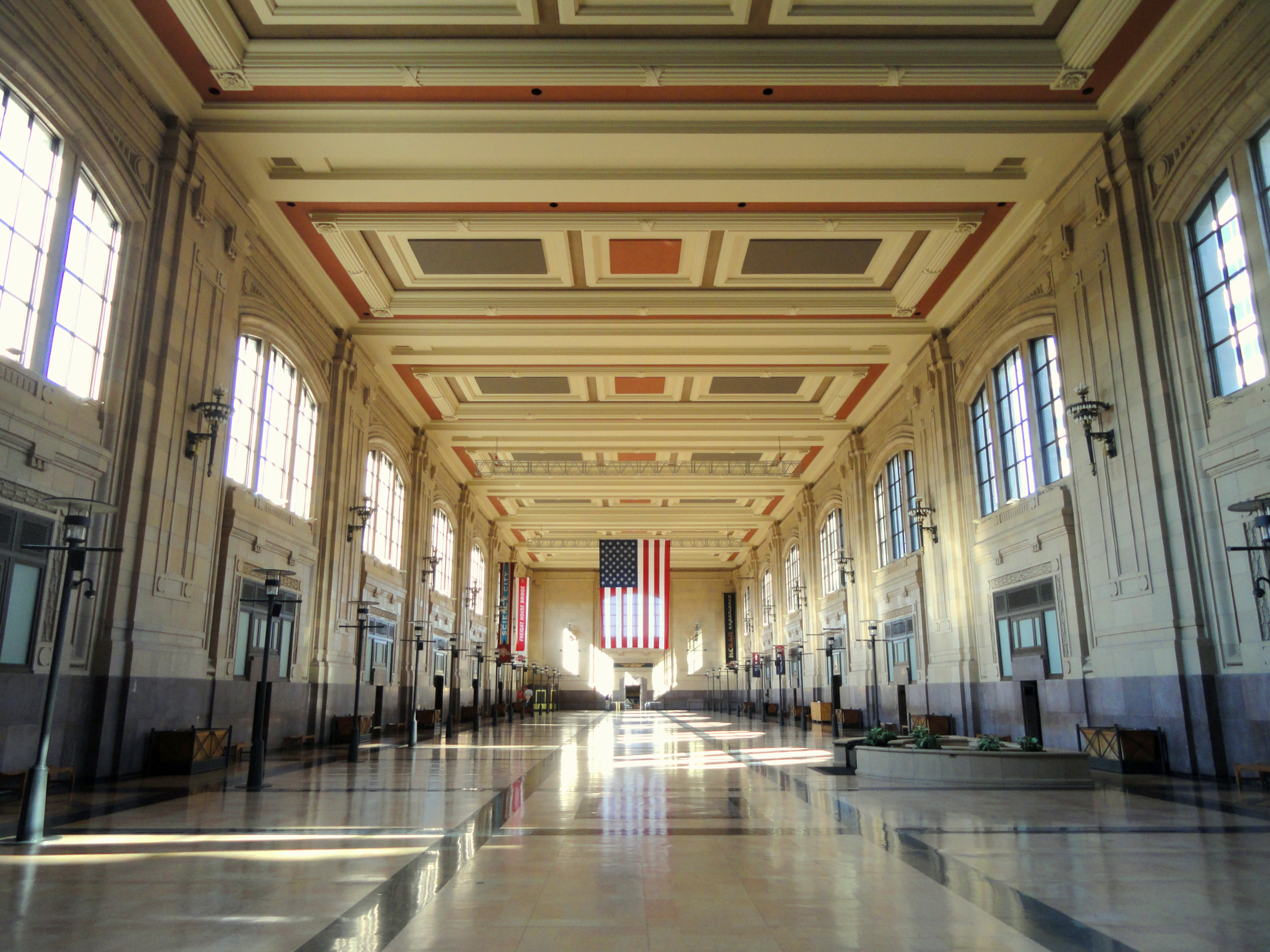
The Grand Plaza or North Waiting Room is beyond the Grand Hall (2011).

In 1996, residents in five counties throughout the Kansas City metropolitan area in both Kansas and Missouri approved the so-called "bistate tax", a 1/8 of a cent sales tax, part of which helped to fund just under half of the $250 million restoration of Union Station. Renovation began in 1997 and was completed in 1999. The remaining money was raised through private donations and federal funding. The renovations enabled Amtrak to move its operations back inside the main building in 2002.

Union Station receives no public funding. Operating costs are funded by general admission and theater ticketing, grants, corporate and private donations, commercial space leases, and facility rental. Union Station Kansas City, Inc., a nonprofit 501(c)(3) organization, manages Union Station and had previously managed the Kansas City Museum. Union Station hosts Science City (opened in 1999), a family-friendly interactive science center with more than 50 hands-on exhibits; the H&R Block City Stage Theater, a live-action venue with productions for all ages; the Regnier Extreme Screen, the largest movie screen in the region at five and half stories tall; two restaurants, including Pierponts, an upscale steak and seafood restaurant, and Harvey's; many shops; the Gottlieb Planetarium, the largest planetarium in the area; and various temporary museum exhibits including Dead Sea Scrolls in 2007, Bodies Revealed in 2008, Dialog in the Dark in 2009, Dinosaurs Unearthed in 2010 and Diana, A Celebration focusing upon Princess Diana in 2011. The Irish Museum and Cultural Center has been located in the station since March 17, 2007.

The old Union Station Powerhouse building was renovated by the Kansas City Ballet. It is the ballet's new home and has been named the Todd Bolender Center for Dance and Creativity since August 2011.

=== Notable events ===
In April 2015 and 2017, the reality TV show American Ninja Warrior was filmed at Union Station.

The 2023 NFL draft was held in front of, and partially inside, Union Station in April 2023.

=== 2024 parade shooting ===
On February 14, 2024, a mass shooting occurred in front of Union Station immediately after the Super Bowl LVIII victory parade and rally honoring the Kansas City Chiefs. One person was killed and 22 others were injured.

== Amtrak ==
The station is served by four Amtrak trains daily. The Missouri River Runner has one round trip service to Gateway Transportation Center in St. Louis in the morning. The Missouri River Runner/Lincoln Service train departs to Chicago Union Station in the afternoon where it shares the same track between St. Louis and Chicago with the Lincoln Service train. The Southwest Chief departs for Chicago Union Station in the morning and for Los Angeles Union Station late evening.

Of the twelve Missouri stations served by Amtrak, Kansas City was the second busiest in the 2015 fiscal year, boarding or disembarking an average 421 passengers daily.

== Gallery ==
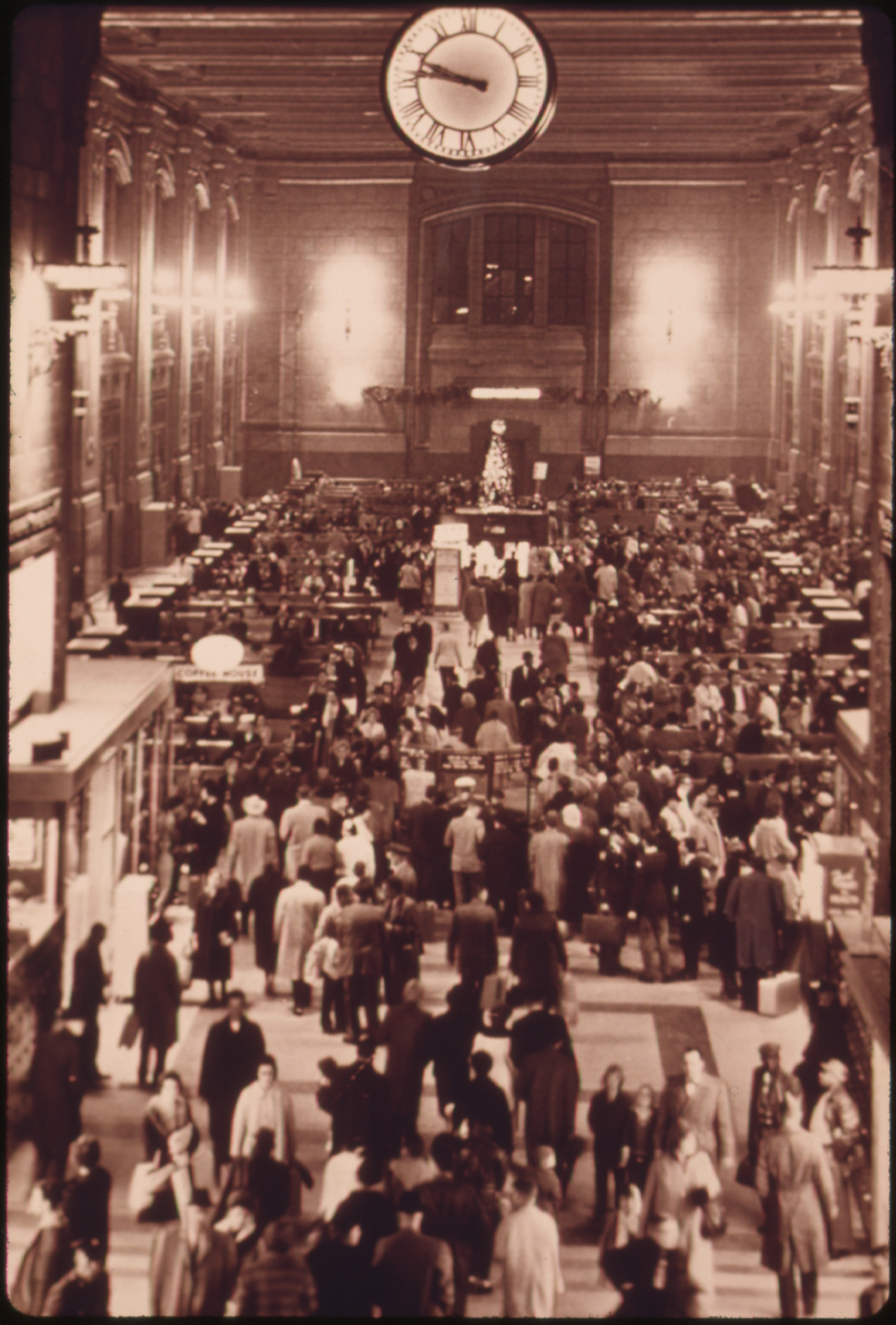
A typical crowd in the Grand Hall of the new Union Station, c. 1950s

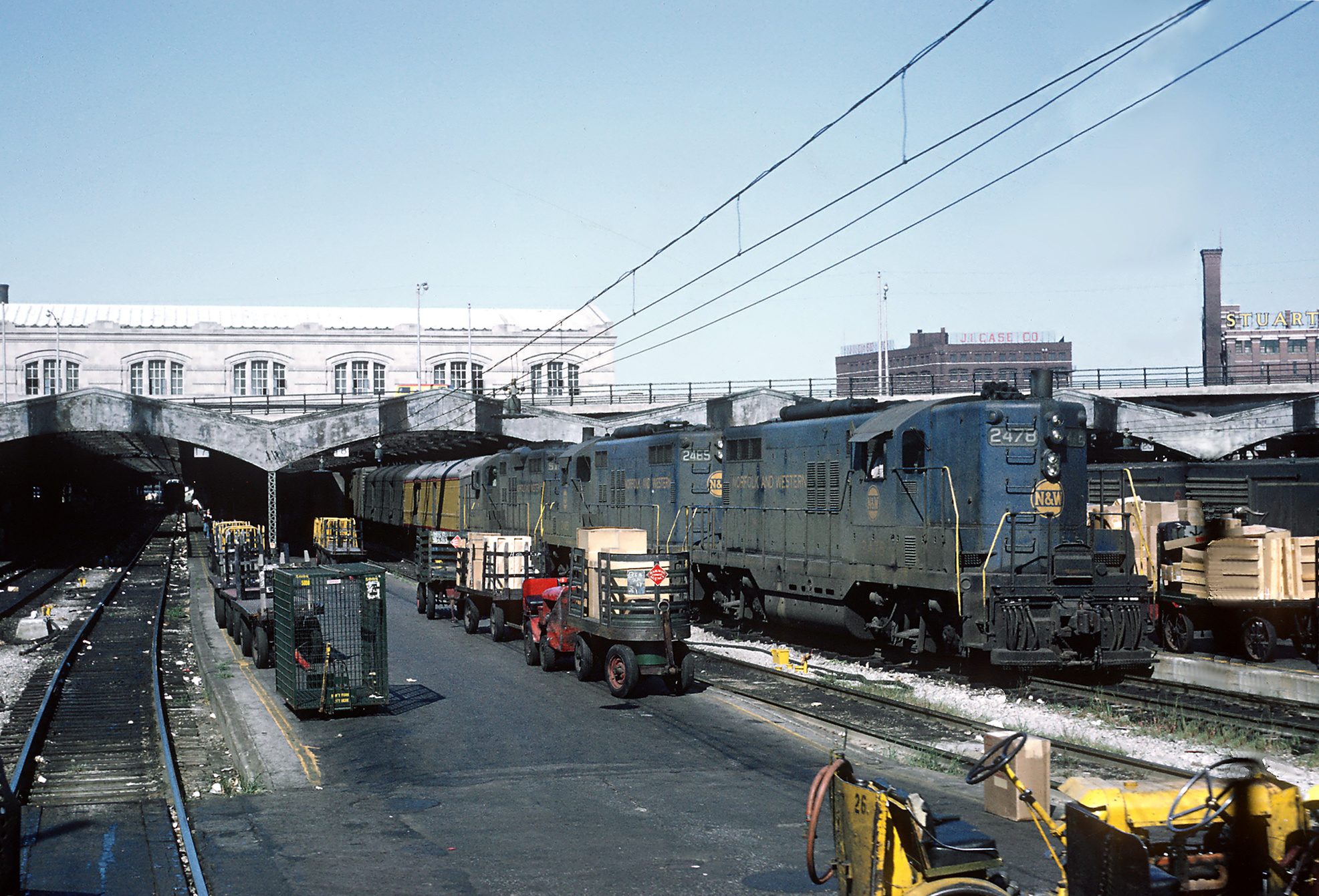
Norfolk and Western's City of St. Louis at Union Station in 1967

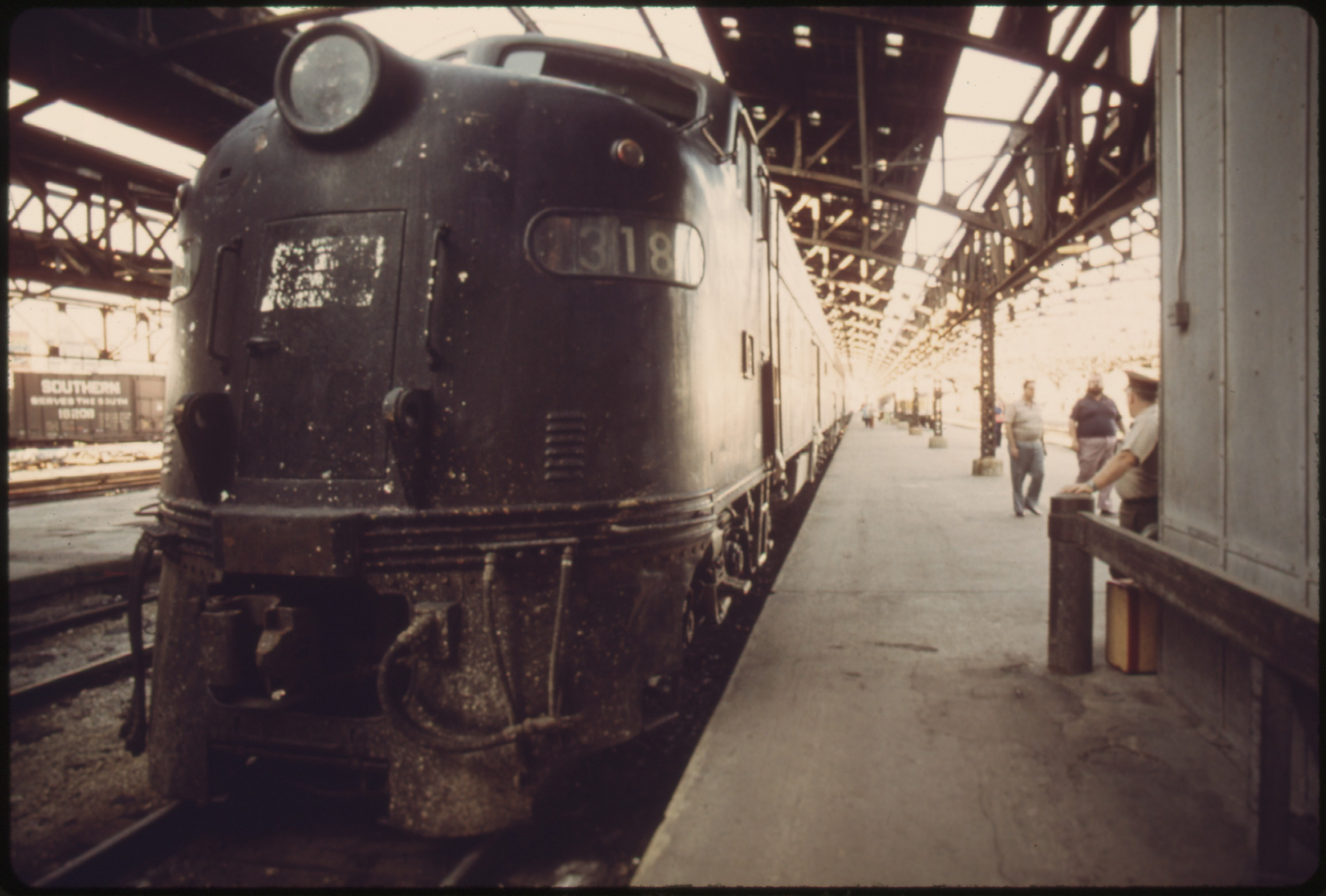
Loading platform, 1974

== See also ==
- List of Amtrak stations
- Pencoyd Railroad Bridge (Kansas City, Missouri)
