= Science City at Union Station =

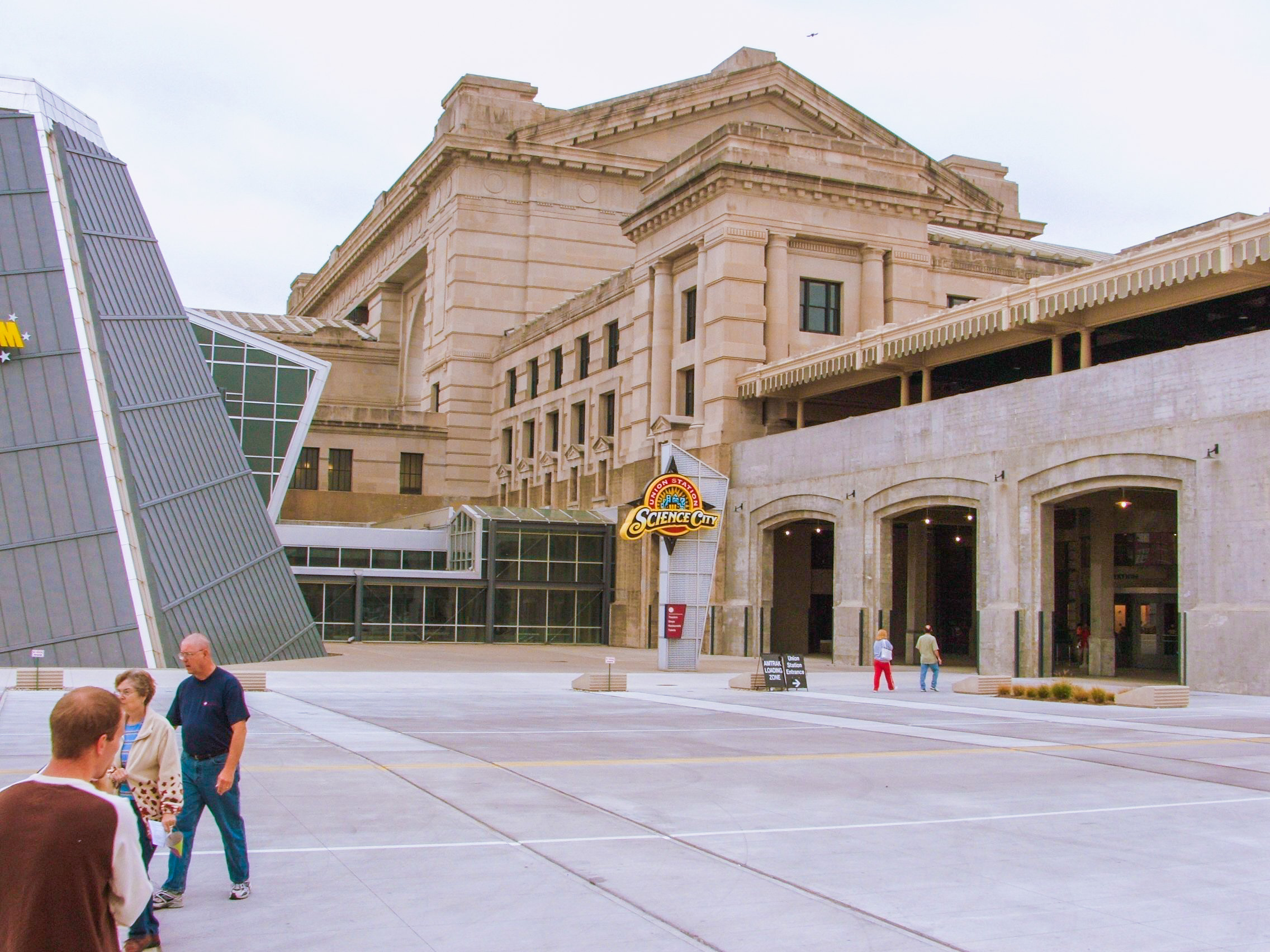
- Established: 1999
- Location: 30 West Pershing Road, Kansas City, Missouri, United States
- Coordinates: 39.0847°N 94.5855°W
- Website: Official website

Science City at Union Station is a family-friendly interactive science center that features traveling exhibitions, The Arvin Gottlieb Planetarium, City Extreme Screen theatre, and more than 120 hands-on displays. It is located inside Union Station at 30 West Pershing Road in Kansas City, Missouri.

It was the main feature in the bi-state renovation vote of 1997. It was part of a renovation plan for Union Station after being closed for a short period of time when Trizec, a Canadian redevelopment firm had failed to redevelop the station. It opened in November 1999.

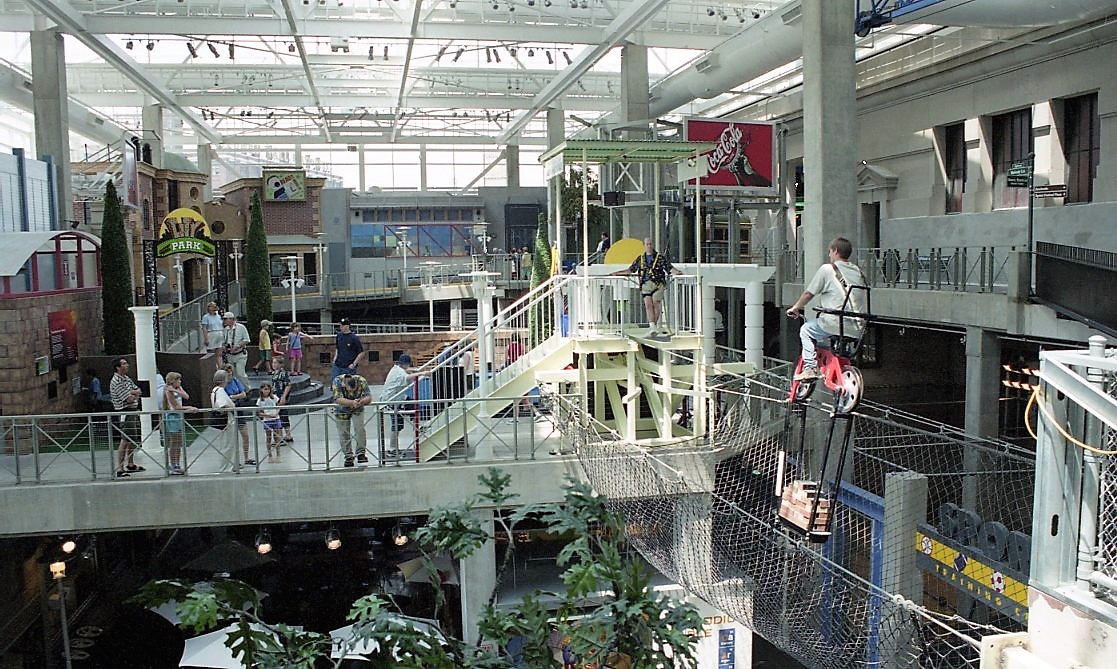
Top floor
