= Tom Pendergast House =

General information
- Type: House
- Architectural style: French Provincial
- Location: 5650 Ward Parkway; Kansas City, Missouri
- Coordinates: 39.0251°N 94.6033°W
- Construction started: 1927
- Governing body: private

Design and construction
- Architect: Edward Tanner

The Tom Pendergast House is a historic residence located at 5650 Ward Parkway in the Country Club District in Kansas City, Missouri.

== History ==
The Thomas J. Pendergast house is a modified design of the French Provincial architectural style. J.C. Nichols Company architect Edward Tanner designed the house. The house was completed in 1927, and members of the Pendergast family lived in the home from the time of completion until Tom Pendergast's death in 1945.

The house at 5650 Ward Parkway is one of the best known in Kansas City, because it was home to political boss Tom Pendergast. Pendergast's political machine is well known for the corruption that took place while it controlled Kansas City. The Pendergast machine bribed police and city leaders to turn a blind eye toward alcohol and gambling laws during the 1920s and 1930s. The wide open access to alcohol and gambling played a major role in the birth of Kansas City jazz, and the Pendergast era also brought large scale development projects to the city, including the Jackson County Courthouse, Fidelity Bank and Trust Building, Municipal Auditorium, Kansas City Power and Light Building, and Kansas City City Hall.

Lloyd C. Stark (the acting governor at that time) and FDR ate away at Pendergast's machine and investigated his dealings, which resulted in Pendergast being charged with a crime and receiving a fifteen-month sentence in the federal jail (Leavenworth Penitentiary). Therefore, the house came to represent the corruption and downfall of one of the political machines in U.S. history.
