= Lawrence station (Kansas) =

Railway station in Lawrence, Kansas, US

Lawrence, KS
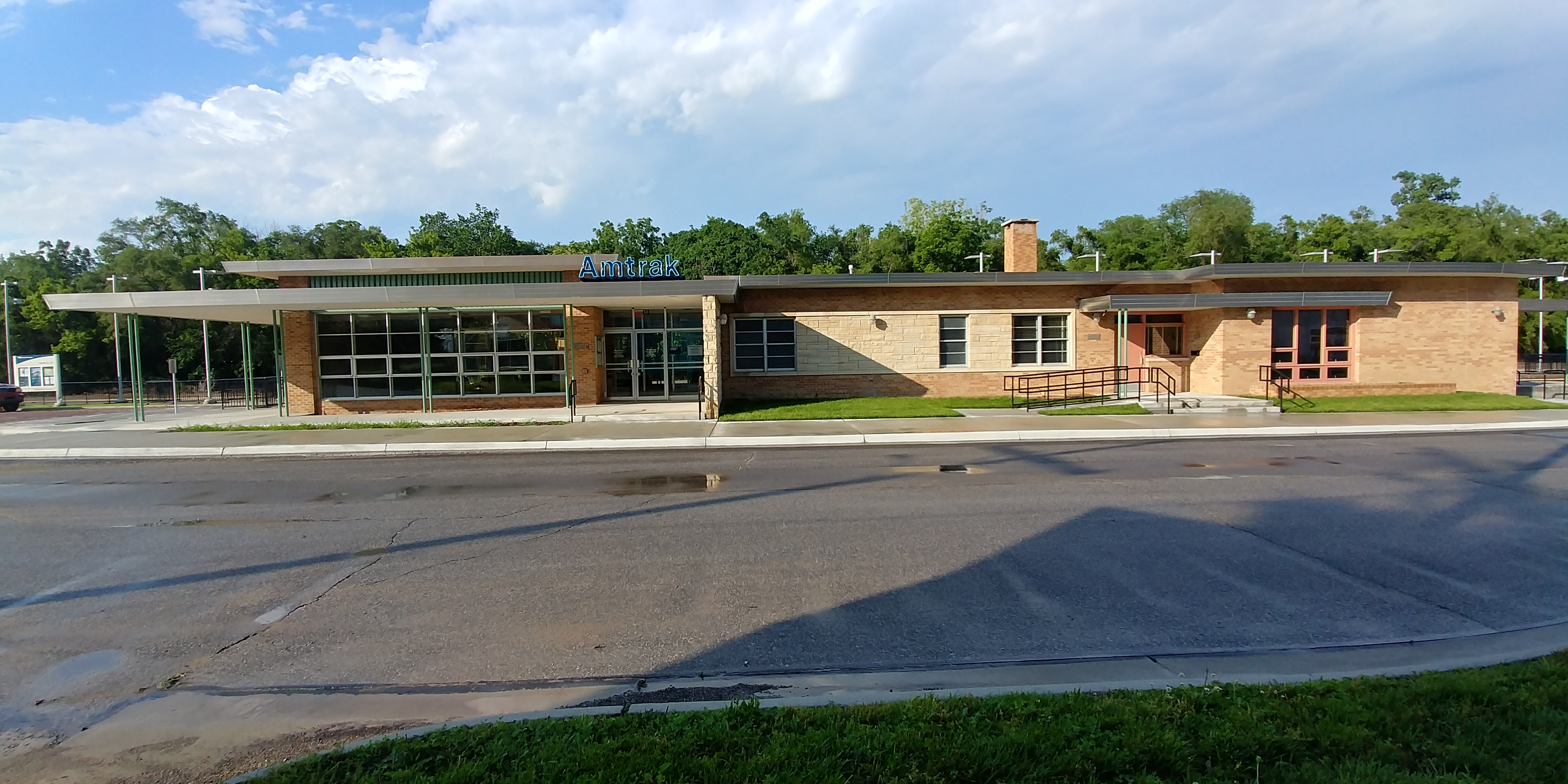
- Lawrence station in June 2019

General information
- Location: 413 East 7th Street; Lawrence, Kansas
- Coordinates: 38.9712°N 95.2305°W
- Owner: BNSF Railway
- Line: BNSF Railway Topeka Subdivision
- Platforms: 1 side platform
- Tracks: 1

Construction
- Accessible: Yes

Other information
- Station code: Amtrak: LRC

History
- Rebuilt: April 19, 1955–February 7, 1956

Passengers
- FY 2025: 8,294 (Amtrak)

Services
Preceding station	Amtrak	Following station
Topeka toward Los Angeles	Southwest Chief	Kansas City toward Chicago
Former services
Preceding station	Amtrak	Following station
Topeka toward Dallas or Houston	Lone Star Until 1979	Kansas City toward Chicago
Preceding station	Atchison, Topeka and Santa Fe Railway	Following station
Lecompton toward Los Angeles	Main Line	Eudora toward Chicago
Vinland toward Ottawa	Ottawa – Lawrence	Terminus
- Santa Fe Depot
- U.S. National Register of Historic Places
- NRHP reference No.: 100001946
- Added to NRHP: January 5, 2018
Location

Lawrence station is a train station in Lawrence, Kansas, United States, served by Amtrak's Southwest Chief train. Built in 1956 to replace an older station, it was added to the National Register of Historic Places in 2018 as Santa Fe Depot.

== History ==
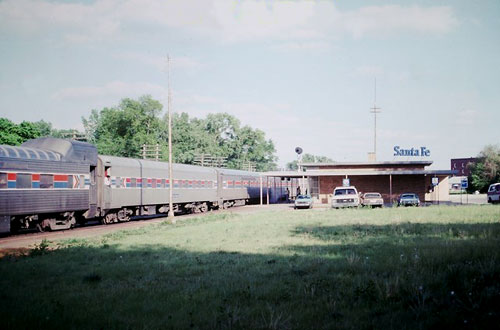
The Southwest Limited at Lawrence in 1980

The Lawrence station was built by the Atchison, Topeka and Santa Fe Railway (Santa Fe) to replace an 1883-built station which was damaged by the Great Flood of 1951. Demolition of the old building began on April 15, 1955; the new station building opened on February 7, 1956. Built in a Mid-Century Modern style, it was designed by Warren Corman and Warren Jones. The Santa Fe built stations of similar style at Arkansas City, Hutchinson, and Topeka.

Amtrak took over intercity passenger rail service in the United States in May 1971. Of the four daily round trips that served Lawrence, the San Francisco Chief and ex-Grand Canyon were discontinued, while Amtrak continued the Texas Chief and Super Chief/El Capitan. Lawrence was also served by the Chief, which had been discontinued in 1968 but was revived for three months in 1972. The Super Chief/El Capitan became the Super Chief in 1973 and the Southwest Limited in 1974, and finally the Southwest Chief in 1984. The Texas Chief was renamed Lone Star in 1974 and discontinued in 1979, ending Chicago–Texas service via Lawrence.

A $1.5 million project in 2011 added an accessible platform and new lighting. The neon signs on the canopy reading "Lawrence" were replaced, while the red "Santa Fe" sign over the entrance was replaced with a similar blue "Amtrak" sign. BNSF Railway donated the station building to the City of Lawrence in 2017. A $1.8 million renovation in 2018 included a new roof, electric, and HVAC systems; accessibility improvements; and other work. A larger parking lot was added the next year. The station was added to the Register of Kansas Historic Places on November 18, 2017, and was listed on the National Register of Historic Places in 2018.
