= Richard W. Bolling =

American politician (1916–1991)

Richard Bolling
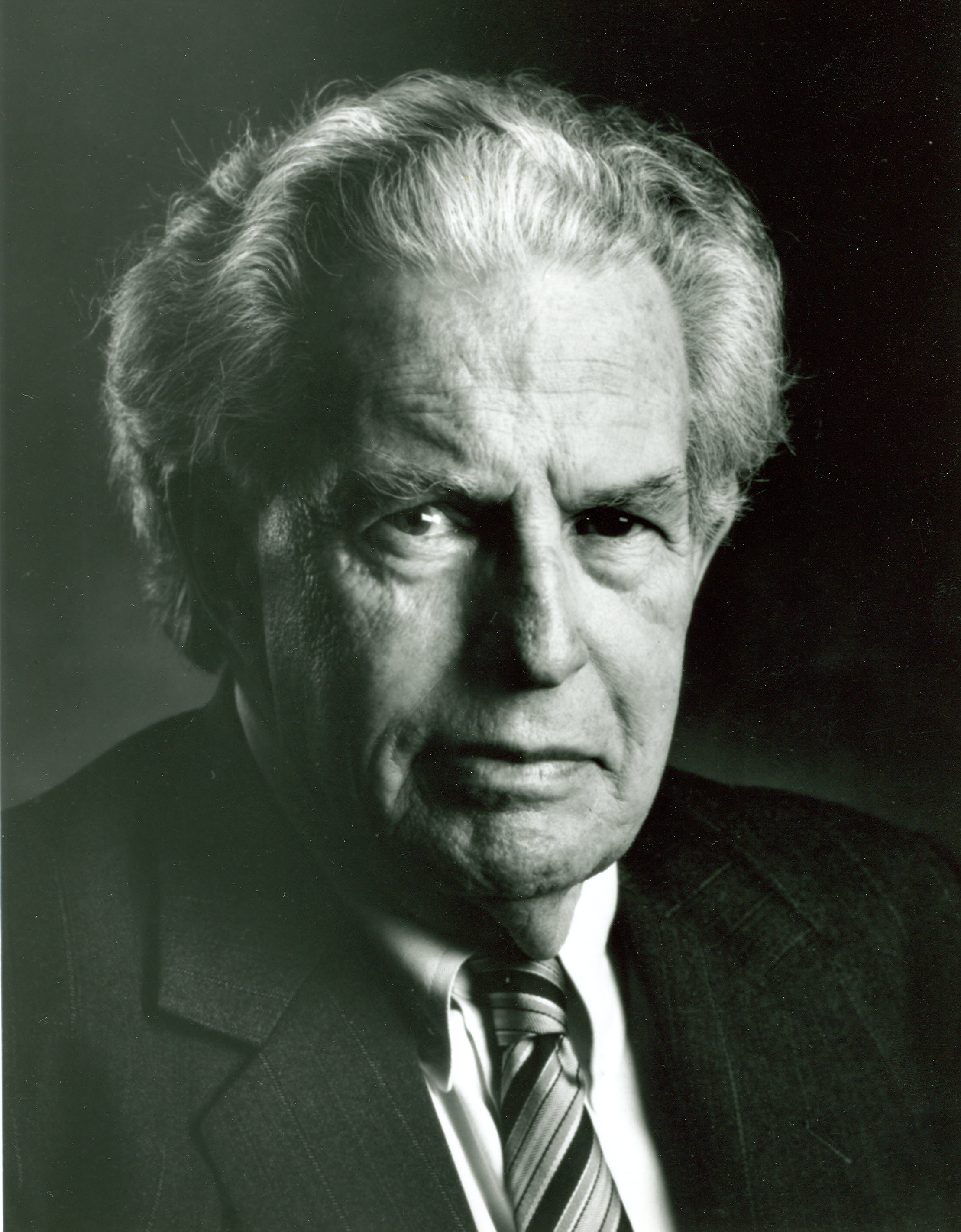

Chair of the House Rules Committee
- In office January 3, 1979 – January 3, 1983
- Preceded by: James J. Delaney
- Succeeded by: Claude Pepper

Member of the U.S. House of Representatives from Missouri's 5th district
- In office January 3, 1949 – January 3, 1983
- Preceded by: Albert L. Reeves Jr.
- Succeeded by: Alan Wheat

Personal details
- Born: Richard Walker Bolling; May 17, 1916 New York City, New York, U.S.
- Died: April 21, 1991 (aged 74) Washington D.C., U.S.
- Party: Democratic
- Spouse(s): Barbara Stratton; Jim Grant Akin; Prudie Luther Orr; Nona Goddard
- Education: University of the South (BA, MA); Vanderbilt University
- Richard W. Bolling's voice Bolling on the rule for debate of the Tax Equity and Fiscal Responsibility Act of 1982. Recorded August 19, 1982

Richard Walker Bolling (May 17, 1916 – April 21, 1991) was a prominent American Democratic Congressman from Kansas City, Missouri, and Missouri's 5th congressional district from 1949 to 1983. He retired after serving for four years as the chairman of the powerful United States House Committee on Rules.

== Early life and education ==
Born in New York City as the great-great-grandson of John Williams Walker and great-great-nephew of Percy Walker, he attended Phillips Exeter Academy, Exeter, New Hampshire. At the age of fifteen, upon his father's death, he returned to the family home in Huntsville, Alabama. He then attended the University of the South, in Sewanee, Tennessee, where he studied literature and French, earning a B.A. in 1937 and an M.A., 1939. He went on to further graduate studies, at Vanderbilt University in Nashville, Tennessee, in 1939–1940.

== Academic career ==
An educational administrator by profession, Bolling taught at Sewanee Military Academy in 1938 and 1939, and then served as assistant to the head of the Department of Education at Florence State Teachers College, in Alabama, in 1940.

After retiring from Congress, Bolling was a visiting professor of political science at the University of Missouri-Kansas City and a professor of politics at Boston College in Massachusetts.

== Military career ==
In April 1941, Bolling entered the United States Army as a private and served until discharged as a lieutenant colonel in July 1946, with four years' overseas service as assistant to the chief of staff to General Douglas MacArthur in Australia, New Guinea, Philippines, and in Japan. He was awarded the Legion of Merit and Bronze Star. He served as veterans' adviser at the University of Kansas City in 1946 and 1947.

== Political career ==
Bolling was elected as a Democrat to the 81st Congress in 1948 and to the sixteen succeeding Congresses, serving from January 3, 1949, until January 3, 1983. In Congress, he served as chairman of the Select Committee on Committees of the House (in the 93rd Congress), Joint Economic Committee (in the 95th Congress); and the Committee on Rules (in the 96th and 97th Congresses). He introduced the discharge petition that released the Civil Rights Act of 1964 from the Senate's committees chaired by southern Democrats, a vital step to passing the act. He was twice a candidate for House Majority leader, losing to Carl Albert in 1961 and to Jim Wright (by three votes) in 1977.

Bolling did not sign the 1956 Southern Manifesto, and voted in favor of the Civil Rights Acts of 1957, 1960, 1964, and 1968, and the Voting Rights Act of 1965, but voted present on the 24th Amendment to the U.S. Constitution.

Due to heart disease, in 1981 he announced his retirement and was not a candidate for reelection in 1982 to the 98th Congress. In 1983, Bolling was elected to the Common Cause National Governing Board. He remained a resident of Washington, D.C., until his death there on April 21, 1991.

== Personal life ==
Bolling resided in Washington, D.C., and maintained a summer home at Portage Point, Michigan. During the 1970s, Congressman Bolling owned a cottage on St. Barthelemy in the French West Indies, which he also rented to other vacationers.

On June 7, 1945, Bolling married Barbara Stratton, the sister of the author and OSS agent Arthur Stratton. They had one daughter, Andrea Walker Bolling. He subsequently married Jim Grant Akin, a Congressional liaison officer for the U.S. Department of Health Education and Welfare, who later served as his legislative affairs assistant. Following her death in 1978, psychologist Dr. Prudie Luther Orr and he were married in Memphis, Tenn. His spouse at the time of his death was Nona Herndon, of Dallas.

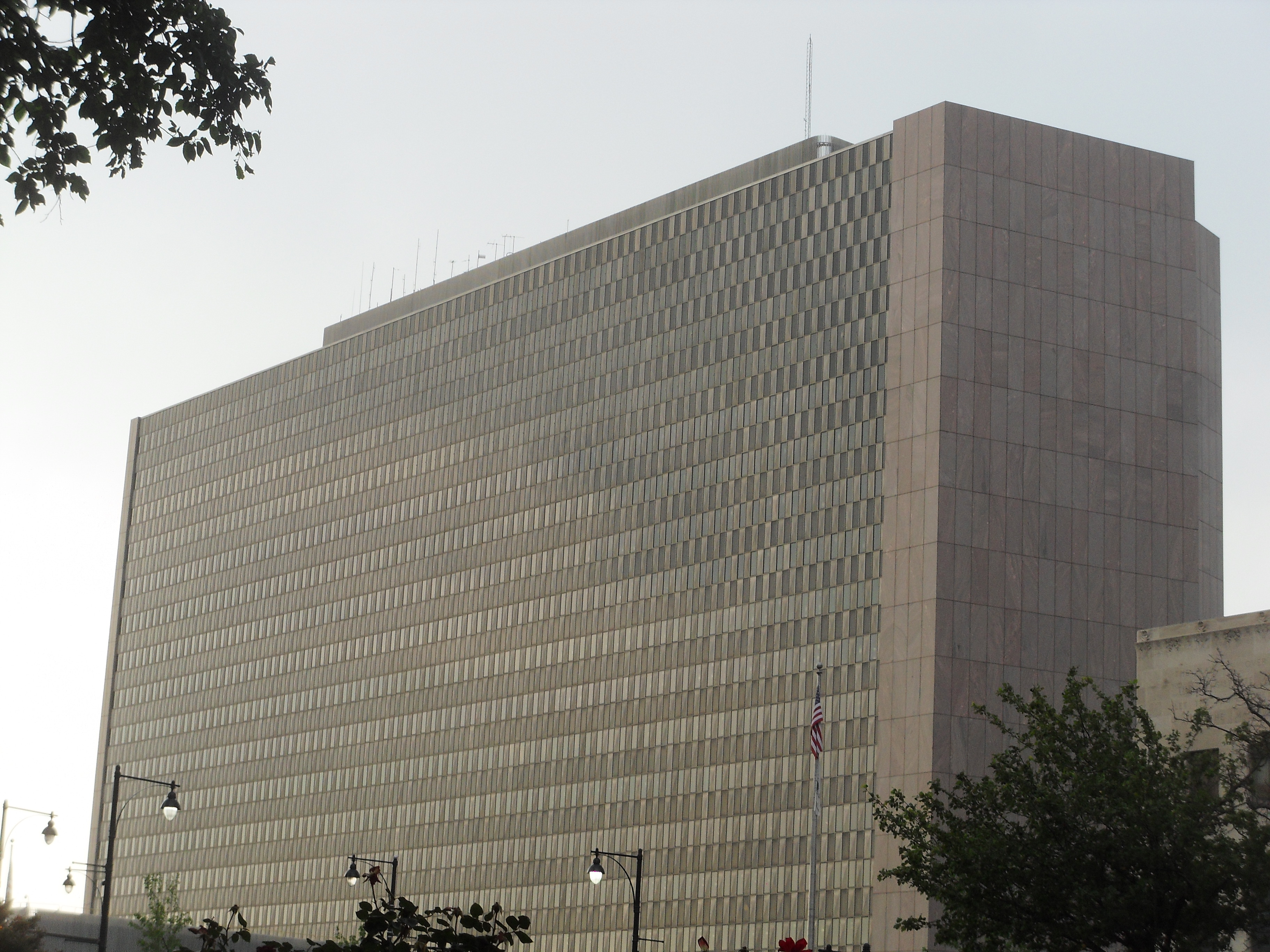
Richard Walker Bolling Federal Building

== Honors ==
The Richard Bolling Federal Building in Kansas City, Missouri is named in his honor.

U.S. House of Representatives
Preceded by Albert L. Reeves Jr.	Member of the U.S. House of Representatives from Missouri's 5th congressional district 1949–1983	Succeeded by Alan Wheat
New office	Chair of the House Committee on Committees; 1973–1974	Position abolished
Preceded by Hubert Humphrey	Chair of the Joint Economic Committee; 1977–1979	Succeeded by Lloyd Bentsen
Preceded by Ray Madden	Chair of the House Rules Committee; 1979–1983	Succeeded by Claude Pepper
