= Roger C. Slaughter =

American politician (1905–1974)

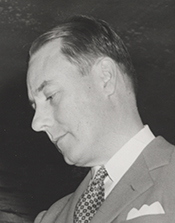

Member of the U.S. House of Representatives from Missouri's 5th district
- In office January 3, 1943 – January 3, 1947
- Preceded by: Joe Shannon
- Succeeded by: Albert L. Reeves Jr.

Personal details
- Born: Roger Caldwell Slaughter; July 17, 1905 near Odessa, Missouri, U.S.
- Died: June 2, 1974 (aged 68) near Odessa, Missouri, U.S.
- Resting place: Greenton Cemetery, Odessa, Missouri, U.S.
- Party: Democratic
- Education: Princeton University (AB); University of Missouri–Kansas City School of Law
- Profession: Politician, lawyer

Roger Caldwell Slaughter (July 17, 1905 – June 2, 1974) was a U.S. representative from Missouri.

Born near Odessa, Missouri, Slaughter attended the public schools at Independence, Missouri. He received an A.B. from Princeton University in 1928, then read law in the office of Hon. Henry L. Jost, Kansas City, Missouri, and attended the Kansas City School of Law. He was admitted to the bar in 1932 and commenced practice in Kansas City. He served as assistant prosecutor of Jackson County, Missouri from 1932 to 1936. He served as member of the board of directors of the school district of Kansas City, Missouri from 1940 to 1942.

Slaughter was elected as a Democrat to the Seventy-eighth and to the Seventy-ninth Congresses (January 3, 1943 – January 3, 1947). He was an unsuccessful candidate for renomination in 1946 to the Eightieth Congress. He served as member of the State Democratic Committee from 1960 to 1962. He resumed the practice of law in Kansas City, Missouri. He was appointed magistrate judge of Lafayette County in 1972. He died, June 2, 1974, on his farm near Odessa, Missouri. He was interred in Greenton Cemetery, Odessa, Missouri.

U.S. House of Representatives
Preceded by Joe Shannon	Member of the U.S. House of Representatives from Missouri's 5th congressional district 1943–1947	Succeeded by Albert L. Reeves Jr.
