= Halstead station =

- Halstead Santa Fe Depot
- U.S. National Register of Historic Places
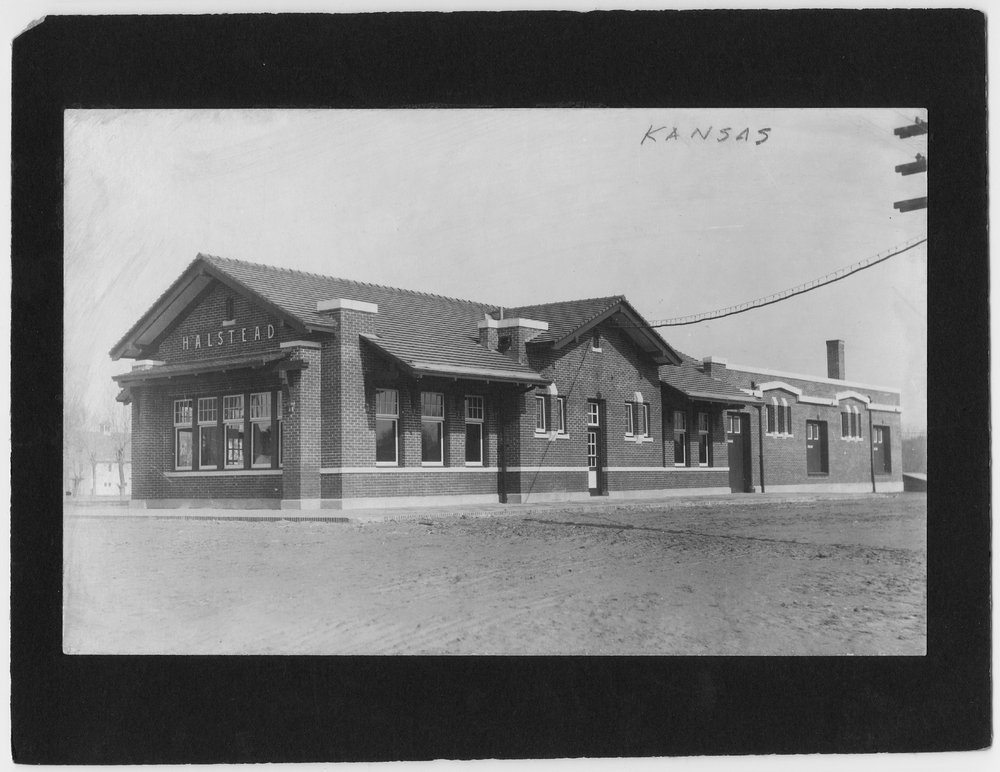

- Location within Kansas Location within the United States
- Location: 116 E. First Street; Halstead, Kansas
- Coordinates: 38°00′21″N 97°30′18″W
- Built: 1917
- Architect: Atchison, Topeka & Santa Fe Railway
- Architectural style: Prairie style
- NRHP reference No.: 01001094
- Added to NRHP: October 11, 2001

The Halstead Station, nominated as the Halstead Santa Fe Depot, is a historic railroad depot building at 116 E. First Street in Halstead, Kansas. The depot was on the main line of the Atchison, Topeka and Santa Fe Railway. It was built in 1917 by Charles A. Fellows at a cost of $25,000, and was written in the Halstead Independent as "the most modern station that can be built... with steam heating, electric lights, toilets, sewer facilities... it is a station capable of meeting the needs of a town 10 times our size."

This was the fourth depot to serve Halstead. The first depot was a two-story structure which burned down in July 1883. A temporary wooden depot served the community until May 1888, when another one-story wooden depot was constructed and served until 1917.

The depot closed in the early 1970s and by 1988 was planned to be demolished. However, the Halstead Historical Society was formed that year for the specific purpose of saving the depot, and purchased the depot four years later for $5,000. After renovations, a museum opened in the depot on March 18, 1995. The station was added to the National Register of Historic Places on October 11, 2001.

Preceding station	Atchison, Topeka and Santa Fe Railway	Following station
Burrton toward Los Angeles	Main Line	Newton toward Chicago
