= Emporia station =

Former train station in Emporia, Kansas, US

Emporia, KS
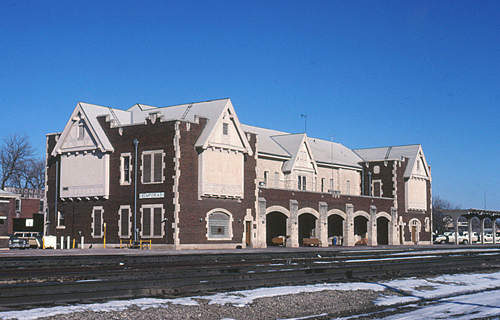
- Emporia station in October 1982

General information
- Location: 3rd Avenue and Neosho Street; Emporia, Kansas
- Coordinates: 38.401494°N 96.186866°W
- Line: BNSF Emporia Subdivision

History
- Opened: 1882
- Closed: May 11, 1997
- Rebuilt: 1926, 1957

Former services
Preceding station	Amtrak	Following station
Newton toward Los Angeles	Southwest Chief Until 1997	Topeka toward Chicago
Newton toward Dallas or Houston	Lone Star Until 1979	Topeka toward Chicago
Preceding station	Atchison, Topeka and Santa Fe Railway	Following station
Plymouth toward Los Angeles	Main Line	Neosho Rapids toward Chicago
Location

Emporia station was a railway station in Emporia, Kansas, United States. It was built in 1882 by the Atchison, Topeka and Santa Fe Railway and was renovated in 1926 and 1957. Amtrak took over intercity passenger service in 1971 and continued serving Emporia with the Texas Chief and Super Chief. The Texas Chief was renamed Lone Star in 1974 and discontinued in 1979. The Super Chief was renamed Southwest Limited in 1974 and Southwest Chief in 1984. Emporia was dropped as a stop in 1997. The station building was destroyed by a fire on August 9, 1999.
