= Winstead's =

Hamburger restaurant chain in Kansas and Missouri, USA

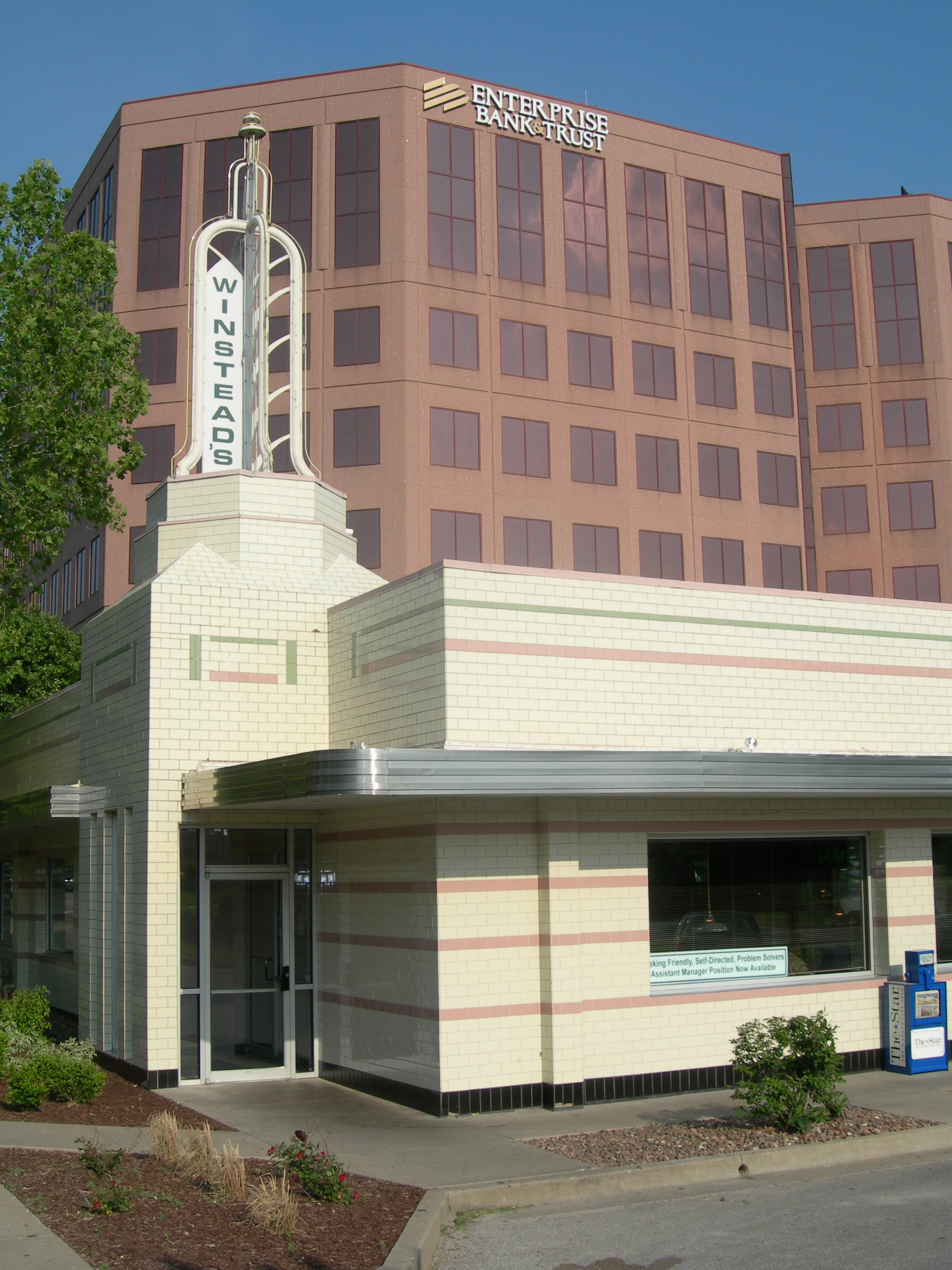
Winstead's Diner, Kansas City

Winstead's /ˈwɪnstɛdz/ is a hamburger chain based in Kansas City, Missouri. The chain opened in 1940 and has two locations in Kansas and Missouri. Apart from its burgers, Winstead's is known for the Streamline Moderne style of its original restaurant, and "skyscraper" sodas and milkshakes built to serve five or six. The chain is owned by Haddad Restaurant Group.

Food Network Magazine rated Winstead's the Best Hamburger in the state of Kansas. Food critic Calvin Trillin considers Winstead's to have the world's best cheeseburgers.

== History ==
Winstead's Drive-In was founded in Springfield, Illinois by Kathryn Winstead in 1936. Winstead's was one of the first drive-in restaurants in the United States. Customers would back into a stall, flash their lights, and a car hop would come out to take the order and deliver food. Around 1938, Kathryn's brother Jack opened a second Winstead's in their hometown of Jacksonville, Illinois. A sister of Jack and Kathryn opened another location in Fort Wayne, Indiana.

In 1932, Fannie Winstead Garst moved from Sedalia, Missouri to Springfield, Illinois, after her husband, Jesse D. Garst, died. Fannie moved to Illinois to live with her sisters Kathryn and Nellie Winstead. In exchange for room and board, Fannie helped her sisters run the Winstead's Drive-In in Springfield. The Winstead family was originally from Smithton, Missouri, and they wanted to return to their Missouri roots. The Winstead sisters returned to Missouri and opened Garst's Drive-In in July 1937. The new drive-in in Sedalia was the first drive-in restaurant west of the Mississippi River.

Nellie and her husband, Gordon Montgomery, began discussing with Kathryn the possibility of opening a Winstead's in Kansas City, Missouri, in the area of the Country Club Plaza. The Winstead sisters found a location just to the east of the Country Club Plaza, near 47th and Main streets; however, they were hesitant to open at the location because Kansas City was run by political machine boss Tom Pendergast, and all new development in and around the Plaza area was run through the powerful real estate developer J.C. Nichols. Nellie and Kathryn Winstead decided to move forward with the Kansas City store, and it opened in 1940. Fannie Winstead Garst remained in Sedalia, where she continued to operate Garst's Drive-In. Instead of offering only car hop service, the new location in Kansas City, built in a Streamline Moderne style, accommodated customers both inside and outside the restaurant. The sisters struggled to keep the restaurant open during World War II as a result of beef rationing; however, the restaurant flourished following the end of the war. They eventually bought the property that they were initially leasing from J.C. Nichols. A second Kansas City area Winstead's was opened in Lee's Summit, Missouri. Johnny Ray's Drive-In is now located in the former Winstead's building in Lee's Summit. One was opened in Independence, Mo. in 1946 on south Main St.(east side, south of the Firestone Tire Service). It remained until the retirement of the owner(s) in 1952.

Kathryn Winstead retired from the restaurant business in 1952, and she turned over control of the business to Nellie and Gordon Montgomery. They added french fries and milkshakes to the limited menu in 1957. Kathryn Winstead died in 1967, and the Montgomerys sold Winstead's restaurant two years later to Morris and Victor Lerner, brothers who owned King Louie International, a Kansas City-based corporation that ran bowling alleys and made bowling attire. The Lerners expanded by opening two new Winstead's locations - one in Kansas City North and the other in Overland Park, Kansas.

In 1982, the Lerner family sold King Louie International to an investment group that considered closing or divesting themselves of the small chain. A local restaurateur, Nabil Haddad, a franchisee and a major stockholder in the McDonald's corporation, today oversees seven Winstead's locations in the greater Kansas City area. Each of the Winstead's locations has a distinctive tower on the front of an art deco-style building.

Winstead's closed its location at 10313 Metcalf Ave. in Overland Park in August 2015. Officials representing the Metcalf 103 shopping center where the restaurant was located indicated that the restaurant's lease was set to expire at the end of August.

On April 15, 2019 Winstead's closed its location at 12056 W 95th St. in Lenexa, KS.

In 2020, Winstead's filed for Chapter 11 bankruptcy protection, owing over $1.5 million in debt.

== See also ==
- List of fast-food restaurants
- List of hamburger restaurants
