= Newton station (Kansas) =

Train station in Newton, Kansas, United States

Newton, KS
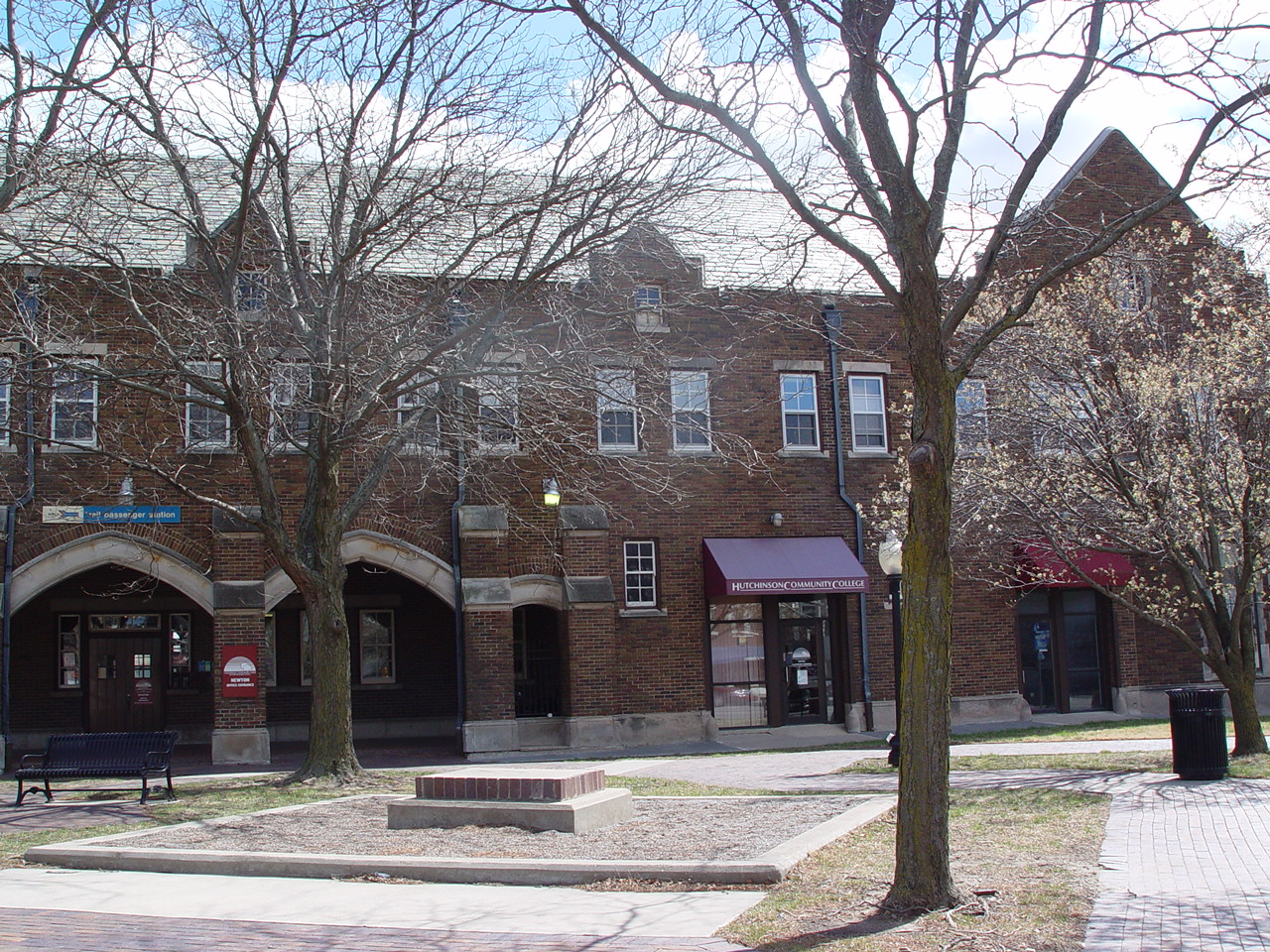
- Northwest side of depot in 2007

General information
- Location: 414 North Main Street; Newton, Kansas
- Owner: Crossroads Lumber Co., Inc.
- Line: BNSF La Junta Subdivision
- Platforms: 1 side platform, 1 island platform
- Tracks: 3

Construction
- Accessible: Yes

Other information
- Station code: Amtrak: NEW

History
- Opened: October 9, 1930
- Rebuilt: 2008

Passengers
- FY 2025: 14,500 (Amtrak)

Services
Preceding station	Amtrak	Following station
Hutchinson toward Los Angeles	Southwest Chief	Topeka toward Chicago
Former services
Preceding station	Amtrak	Following station
Wichita toward Dallas or Houston	Lone Star	Emporia toward Chicago
Preceding station	Atchison, Topeka and Santa Fe Railway	Following station
Halstead toward Los Angeles	Main Line	Walton toward Chicago
Terminus	Newton – Purcell	Sedgwick toward Purcell
Proposed services
Preceding station	Amtrak	Following station
Wichita toward Fort Worth	Heartland Flyer	Terminus
- Santa Fe Depot (Newton Station)
- U.S. National Register of Historic Places
- Location: Newton, Kansas, US
- Coordinates: 38.0471°N 97.3444°W
- Built: 1929 to 1930
- Architect: E.H. Harrison & M. R. Stauffer
- Architectural style: Tudor Revival
- NRHP reference No.: 85000735
- Added to NRHP: 1985
Location

Newton station is a train station in Newton, Kansas, United States, located at the southeast corner of Main and 5th streets, and currently served by Amtrak's Southwest Chief train. It is the nearest station to Wichita (the largest city in Kansas).

The current station building was constructed from 1929 to 1930 in a Tudor Revival, modeled after William Shakespeare's house in Stratford-on-Avon, then opened in 1930 to provide passenger service for the Atchison, Topeka and Santa Fe Railway (now BNSF Railway). It was added to the National Register of Historic Places in 1985.

In 2021, Amtrak proposed to extend the Heartland Flyer from Oklahoma City through Wichita to connect with the Southwest Chief in Newton. In November 2023, KDOT said the service would start in 2029, but could begin sooner were the project to be fast tracked.
