= James Pendergast =

American politician (1856–1911)

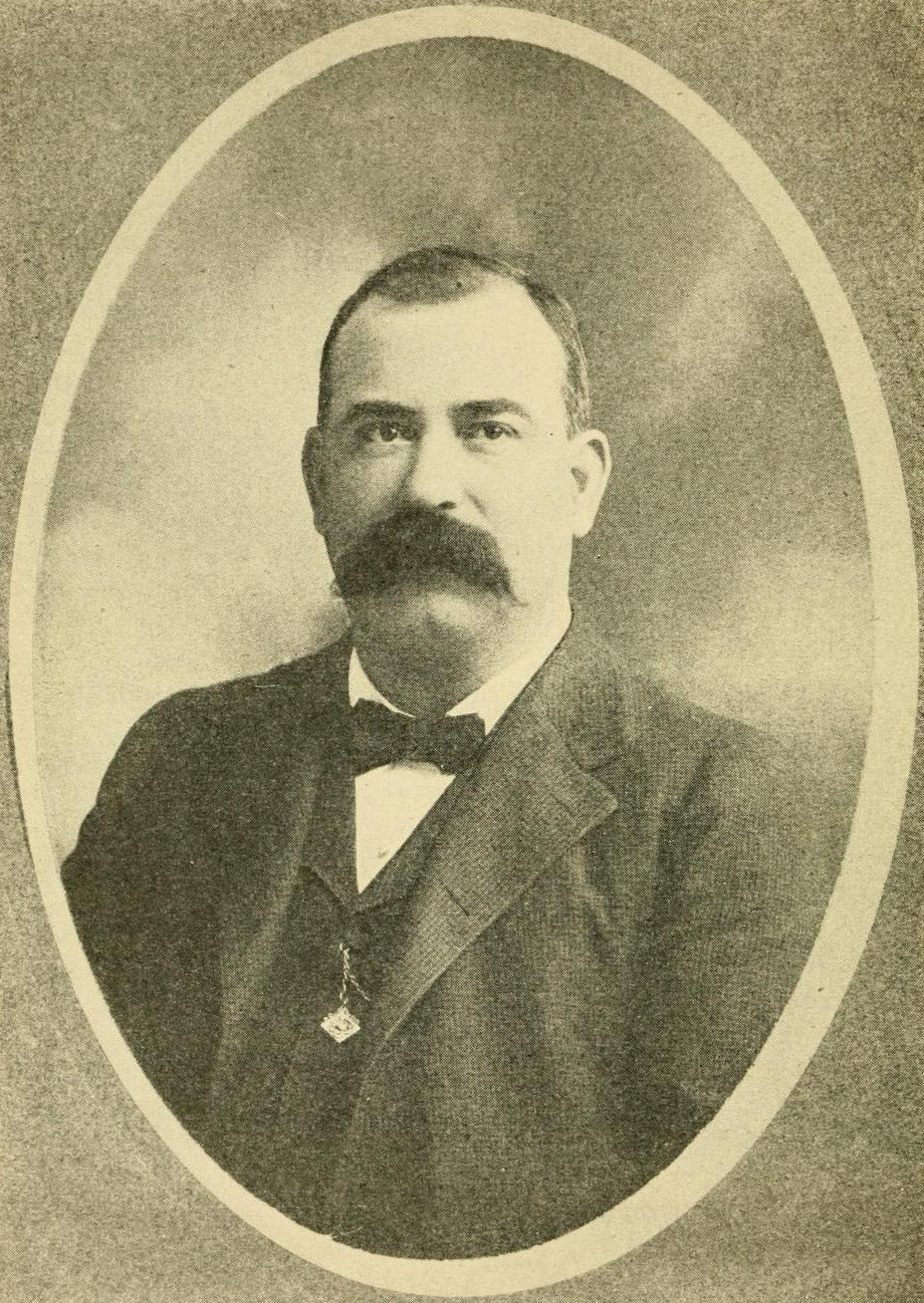
- Pendergast in a 1902 publication

Personal details
- Born: James Francis Pendergast; January 27, 1856 Gallipolis, Ohio, U.S.
- Died: November 10, 1911 (aged 55) Kansas City, Missouri, U.S.
- Resting place: Mount Saint Mary's Cemetery; Kansas City, Missouri, U.S.
- Party: Democratic
- Spouse: Mary Kline Doerr (m. 1886; died 1905)
- Relations: Thomas J. Pendergast (brother)
- Occupation: Politician

James Francis Pendergast (January 27, 1856 – November 10, 1911) was a Democratic politician and the first Big City Boss of Kansas City, Missouri. He rose to prominence in the West Bottoms as the proprietor of saloons and gambling establishments and became head of a political faction that held significant control over local politicians and law enforcement in Kansas City. Known as "Alderman Jim," he was known for his generosity to the working-class residents of the industrial areas of the city. He was also repudiated by reform-minded Kansas City elites for spreading the vices of alcohol and gambling, and for his political corruption. He retired from political life in 1910, handing control of his faction to his younger brother Thomas J. Pendergast.

== Early life ==
Pendergast was born on January 27, 1856, in Gallipolis, Ohio, to Michael and Mary Pendergast. His family moved to St. Joseph, Missouri in 1859. He was educated at the public schools there and at Christian Brothers College. In 1876, he moved to Kansas City, Missouri.

== Career ==
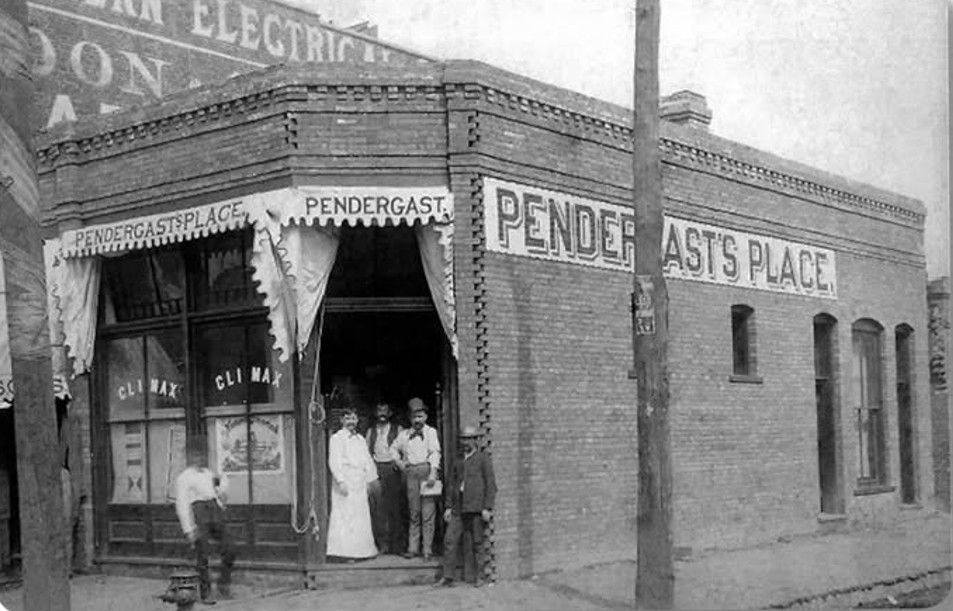
Standing in front of his Climax Saloon, James Pendergast (wearing a vest, in the center) is pictured next to his younger brother Tom (wearing a bowler hat).

=== Early business career ===
Pendergast moved to the industrial West Bottoms neighborhood of Kansas City in 1876, living in boarding houses. He worked in meatpacking houses, Keystone Iron Works, A. J. Kelly Foundry, and D. M. Jarboe Foundry. In the early 1880s, he purchased a saloon he named Climax, which, according to family legend, was named after the winning horse that funded the purchase. However, this business does not appear in records from the time. In 1881, he purchased a two-story saloon, boarding house, and hotel in the West Bottoms called American House. The establishment held gambling devices and acted as an informal bank where meatpacking workers could cash their paychecks or take loans. Pendergast ran the boarding house for about 31 years, and it provided him with the connections and influence to begin his career in politics.

=== Political career ===
==== 1884-1894 ====
In 1884, Pendergast was elected as a delegate to represent the Sixth Ward in the West Bottoms in the Democratic City Convention. In 1887, after population growth had expanded the city legislature and the West Bottoms became a part of the First Ward, Pendergast became the Democratic committeeman for the First Ward, responsible for assembling supporters for a voice vote in "mob primaries." He was elected alderman of the First Ward from 1892 to 1910. Known as "Alderman Jim" and "Big Jim", Pendergast ran on a pro-gambling and pro-working-class platform. He facilitated the release of men arrested for drunkenness and disorderly conduct, and donated food and coal. A national economic downturn in the 1890s and lack of interest in providing charity to those affected on the part of the city's other business elites gave Pendergast the opportunity to claim sole responsibility for holding the city together during this time, while increasing his political power.

==== 1894-1900 ====
In 1894, Pendergast's younger brother Tom moved to Kansas City, working odd jobs and assisting at his brother's saloon and horse-race track concessions stand. Through a political favor, Jim Pendergast obtained a job for Tom as a deputy constable in the First Ward city court. In 1896, Tom received a higher-paying job as deputy marshal in county court that allowed him to stop working other jobs and gave him more free time to focus on learning about city politics from his brother. Under Jim Pendergast's guidance, Tom began to participate in grass-roots political organizing in his spare time, helping secure votes for his brother's political cronies.

At the Jackson County election of 1894, Pendergast and the Democrats faced off against local Republicans aligned with the anti-Catholic American Protective Association. Pre-election campaigning led to a gun battle between the two sides that resulted in one dead and several injured. The Republicans won at the ballot, but Pendergast was one of two Democrats who retained his office. Pendergast then created an association of alcohol brewers, distributors, and saloonkeepers to counter pressure from local members of the burgeoning dry movement.

Between 1894 and 1900, Pendergast's "Goats" faction clashed over city and county elections with the "Rabbits" faction of rival Kansas City Democratic boss Joe Shannon. The candidates of the two Democratic factions occasionally canceled each other out at the ballot box, resulting in a Republican victory. In 1900, the Goats founded the Jackson Democratic Club. While Pendergast held no official position within the club, the organization was de facto under his control. To resolve the feud with Shannon, the two agreed on what became known as the "Fifty-Fifty accord," in which they would continue to run separate candidates in primaries but unite on candidates for general elections. However, neither faction fully held to this deal.

The 1900 Democratic National Convention, held in Kansas City, featured a welcoming address by James A. Reed, who had just been elected major of Kansas City with assistance from Pendergast.

==== 1900-1910 ====
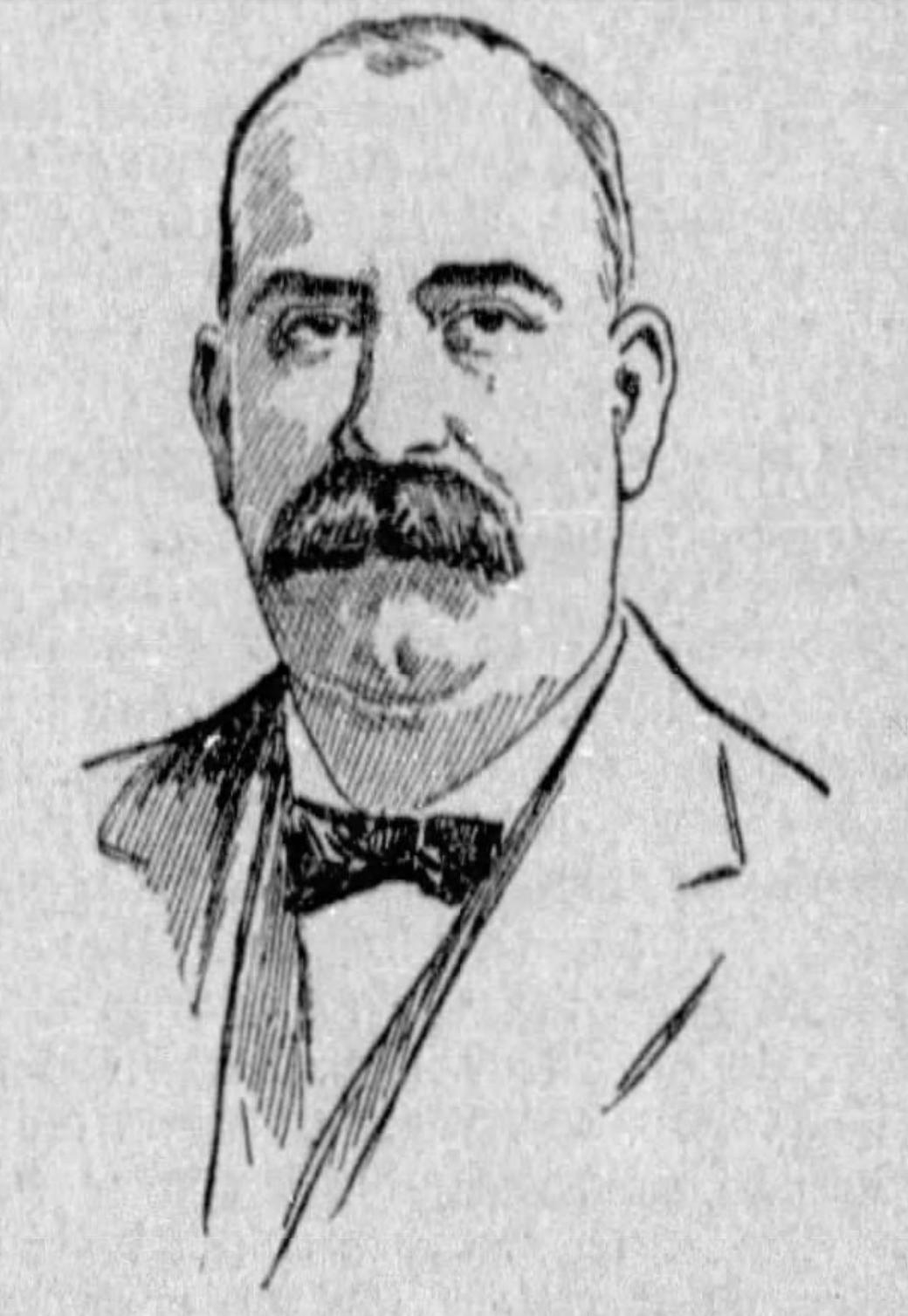
Drawing of Pendergast included in his obituary in The Kansas City Times, 1911.

In retaliation for Kansas City police arresting thirty-eight men at one of his dice games, Pendergast took control of the city police board and began hand-selecting police officers who would be favorable to him. By 1902, Pendergast had chosen over 70% of the officers serving on the force. The pressure on Pendergast by anti-vice reformers continued mounting, however. One of the significant outcomes was that legislators in Missouri placed Kansas City's police department under direct state oversight, meaning that officers who had once been beholden to Pendergast were effectively beyond his control. In 1910, in part due to relentless pressure and disparagement from reformists, Pendergast retired from politics, leaving control over his political faction to his brother Tom.

=== Rivalries ===
Pendergast's chief political rival within the Kansas City Democratic party was Joe Shannon. One suggested explanation for the names of the two factions (Pendergast's Goats and Shannon's Rabbits) is that Shannon's political acumen was built on a network of informers likened to a warren of rabbits. Another is Pendergast's appeal to the poor residents of the bluff-side shanties around the West Bottoms, who were said to live like mountain goats. These two animal symbols were printed atop voting ballots, ostensively to aid illiterate voters. Kansas City's common political jargon included those animals until long after World War II; Harry S. Truman began his political career as a Goat. While Pendergast and Shannon were bitter rivals in public, in the last months of his life Pendergast attempted, unsuccessfully, to use his remaining influence to get Shannon elected to Congress.

Pendergast also feuded with William Rockhill Nelson, founder and editor-in-chief of the Kansas City Star, who advocated for a vision of Kansas City as a highbrow, orderly city and criticized the corruption and vice of Pendergast's political machine. Pendergast and Nelson shared a desire to improve the civic infrastructure of the city, with Pendergast supporting Nelson's efforts to create new public parks and boulevards. However, he was unable to thwart the continuing efforts of Nelson and other reformers to draw negative attention towards the brothels, drinking establishments, and gambling dens controlled by his machine.

== Personal life ==
Pendergast married Mary Kline Doerr in 1886. She was ten years older than him and had a son from a previous marriage. She died in 1905. The death of his wife caused Pendergast to become less interested in furthering his business and political career, and to devote himself more to Roman Catholicism.

Pendergast retired to a farm in Johnson County after leaving politics in 1910. In his later years, he had suffered from respiratory and kidney disease, and when he became too ill to live alone, he moved in with his sister Margaret and her husband. He became bedridden in September 1911 and was attended to by his family. The last words he spoke were to ask for his brother Tom and greet him when Tom came to his bedside. He died on November 10, 1911, and he was buried at Mount Saint Mary's Cemetery in Kansas City.

== Legacy ==
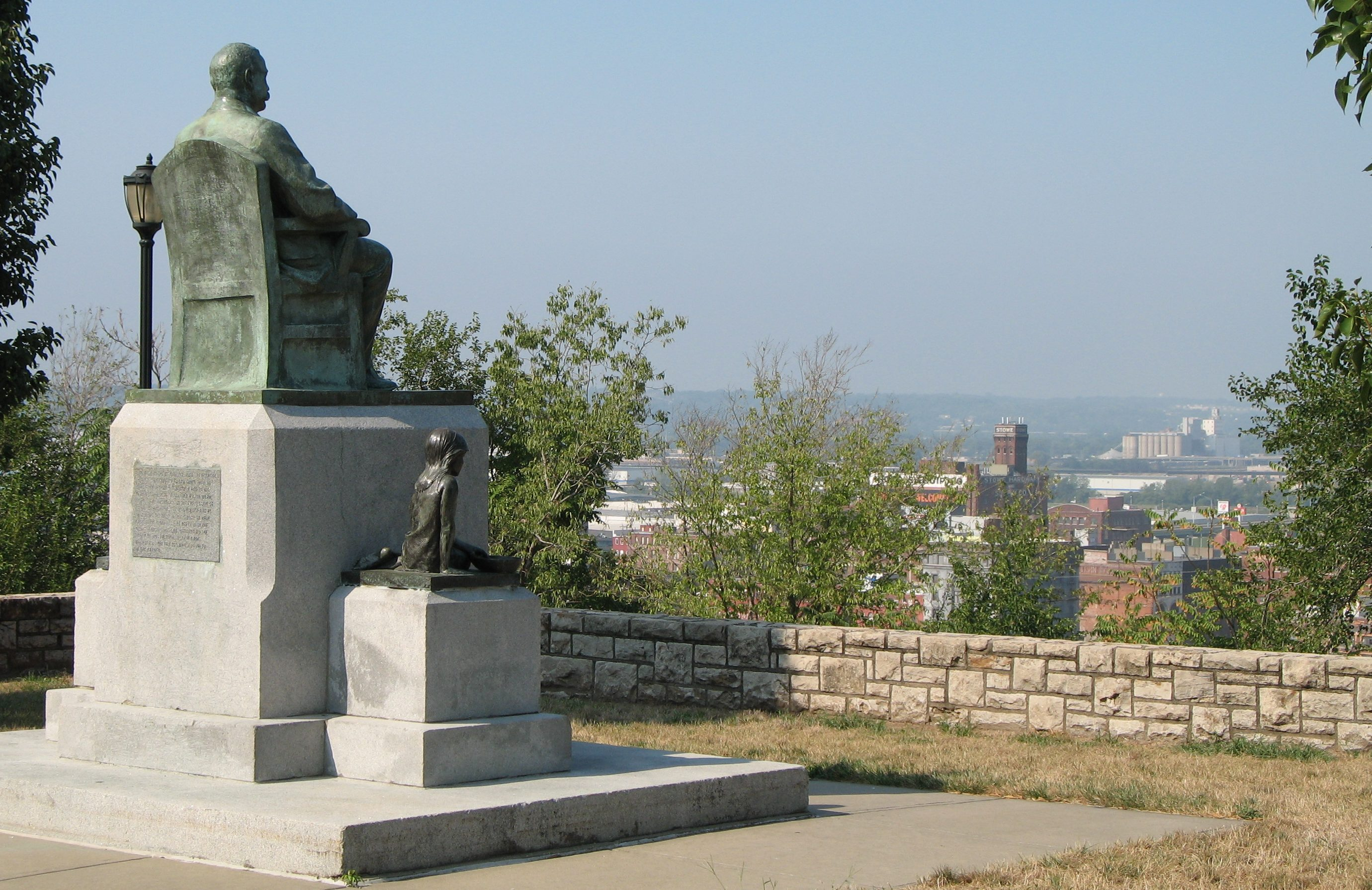
A statue of James Pendergast is on Quality Hill overlooking the West Bottoms.

William Rockhill Nelson wrote an obituary of Pendergast in the Kansas City Star, claiming that while Pendergast "never failed to take political advantage of an opponent," that nevertheless "[h]is support of any man or measure never had a price in cash."

After Pendergast's death, a statue of him was placed in Mulkey Square overlooking the West Bottoms. In 1990, the statue was moved to Case Park on Quality Hill.
