= Albert L. Reeves Jr. =

American attorney, politician and businessman (1906–1987)

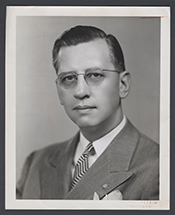

Member of the U.S. House of Representatives from Missouri's 5th district
- In office January 3, 1947 – January 3, 1949
- Preceded by: Roger C. Slaughter
- Succeeded by: Richard W. Bolling

Personal details
- Born: Albert Lee Reeves Jr. May 31, 1906 Steelville, Missouri, U.S.
- Died: April 15, 1987 (aged 80) San Diego, California, U.S.
- Party: Republican
- Education: William Jewell College; University of Missouri School of Law
- Profession: Politician, attorney, businessman

Military service
- Allegiance: United States
- Branch/service: United States Army
- Years of service: 1942–1946
- Rank: Lieutenant colonel
- Unit: United States Army Corps of Engineers

Albert Lee Reeves Jr. (May 31, 1906 – April 15, 1987) was an American attorney, politician and businessman. He was a U.S. representative from Missouri for one term from 1947 to 1949.

== Early life ==
Reeves was born in Steelville, Missouri, and attended public school in Kansas City, Missouri. He graduated from William Jewell College, Liberty, Missouri, in 1927. He taught at Baylor University in Waco, Texas, in 1927 and 1928, and was a student at Harvard University in 1928 and 1929. Reeves graduated from the University of Missouri Law School at Columbia in 1931.

== Career ==
He was admitted to the bar the same year and commenced practice in Kansas City, Missouri. He entered the United States Army Corps of Engineers on active duty in July 1942 as captain, Missouri River Division, and served in India, Burma, and China. He was promoted through the ranks to lieutenant colonel and relieved from active duty April 23, 1946, to resume the practice of law.

Reeves was elected as a Republican to the Eightieth Congress (January 3, 1947 – January 3, 1949). He owed his success to two men. His father of the same name as a federal judge had successfully weakened the Democratic Pendergast organization in Kansas City. The second man was Harry Truman who allied with the Pendergast remnants to deny renomination to the Democratic House incumbent, who from his Rules Committee seat had opposed many of the President's legislative initiatives. The loss of the Democratic replacement to Reeves Jr. embarrassed Truman. But in 1948 a new Democratic nominee, after winning over the Pendergast candidate, retook the seat from Reeves. Reeves' share of the vote dropped by over nine points.

=== Later career ===
After serving in Congress, Reeves practiced law in Kansas City, Missouri, and Washington, D.C., and was senior vice president at Utah Construction & Mining Co., San Francisco, California. He served as director and secretary of Marcona Corporation and Affiliates.

=== Death and burial ===
Reeves was a resident of Pauma Valley, California, until his death in La Jolla, California, on April 15, 1987. He was cremated and his ashes buried at St. Francis Church, Pauma Valley.

U.S. House of Representatives
Preceded by Roger C. Slaughter	Member of the U.S. House of Representatives from Missouri's 5th congressional district 1947-1949	Succeeded by Richard W. Bolling
