= Topeka station =

Amtrak station in Topeka, Kansas

Topeka, KS
- A BNSF freight train passes the station (at left) in 2013

General information
- Location: 500 SE Holliday Place; Topeka, Kansas
- Coordinates: 39.0515°N 95.6647°W
- Owner: BNSF Railway
- Line: BNSF Topeka Subdivision
- Platforms: 1 side platform, 1 island platform
- Tracks: 2

Construction
- Accessible: Yes

Other information
- Station code: Amtrak: TOP

History
- Rebuilt: December 1948; 2006

Passengers
- FY 2025: 9,096 (Amtrak)

Services
Preceding station	Amtrak	Following station
Newton toward Los Angeles	Southwest Chief	Lawrence toward Chicago
Former services
Preceding station	Amtrak	Following station
Emporia toward Dallas or Houston	Lone Star	Lawrence toward Chicago
Preceding station	Atchison, Topeka and Santa Fe Railway	Following station
Pauline toward Los Angeles	Main Line	Tecumseh toward Chicago
Location

Topeka station is an Amtrak train station in Topeka, Kansas, United States, served by the Southwest Chief train. The station was built in 1948 by the Atchison, Topeka and Santa Fe Railway as a replacement for the former Topeka Harvey House, which was in use from 1878 to 1940. The existing station was remodeled by the BNSF Railway in 2006.
