= Tom Pendergast =

American political boss (1872–1945)

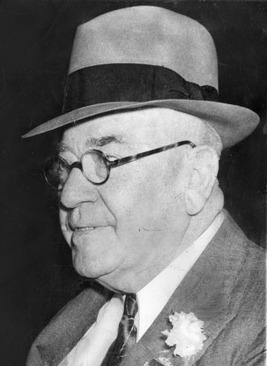
- Pendergast at the 1936 Democratic National Convention

Chairman of the Jackson County Democratic Party
- In office 1925–1939

Member of the Kansas City, Missouri City Council
- In office 1911–1916

Personal details
- Born: Thomas Joseph Pendergast; July 22, 1872 St. Joseph, Missouri, U.S.
- Died: January 26, 1945 (aged 72) Kansas City, Missouri, U.S.
- Resting place: Calvary Cemetery; Kansas City, Missouri, U.S.
- Party: Democratic
- Spouse: Caroline Snyder (m. 1911)
- Relations: James Pendergast (brother)
- Children: 3

Thomas Joseph Pendergast (July 22, 1872 – January 26, 1945), also known as T. J. Pendergast, was an American political boss who controlled Kansas City and Jackson County, Missouri, from 1925 to 1939.

Pendergast only briefly held elected office, as an alderman, but his capacity as chairman of the Jackson County Democratic Party allowed him to use his large network of Irish family and friends to help the election of politicians, in some cases by voter fraud, and to hand out government contracts and patronage jobs. He became wealthy in the process, but his addiction to gambling, especially horse racing, later led to a large accumulation of personal debts.

In 1939, he was convicted of income tax evasion and served 15 months in a federal prison. The Pendergast organization helped to launch the political career of future president Harry S. Truman, which caused Truman's early enemies to dub him "the senator from Pendergast".

== Early years ==
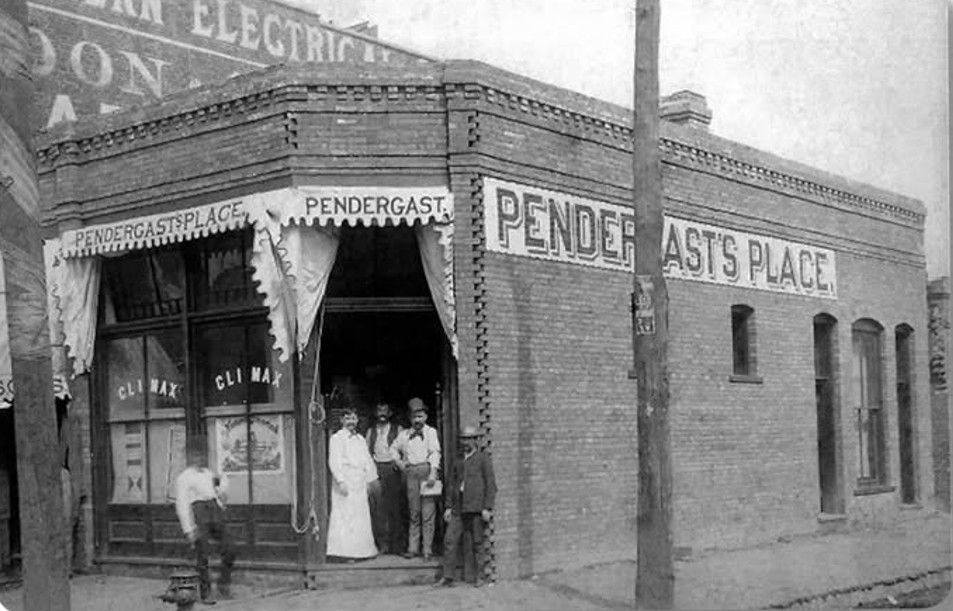
Tom Pendergast (wearing a bowler hat) with brother James (wearing vest) in front of their Climax Saloon.

Thomas Joseph Pendergast, also known to close friends as "TJ", was born in St. Joseph, Missouri. Raised as a Catholic, he had nine brothers and sisters. The family's name is misspelled as Pendergest in the 1880 census and is listed accordingly.

In the 1890s, the young Tom Pendergast worked in his older brother James Pendergast's West Bottoms Climax Saloon. The West Bottoms were then an immigrant section of town located at the "bottom" of the bluffs overlooking the Missouri River above which spread the more prosperous sections of Kansas City. James Pendergast, an alderman in Kansas City's city council, tutored him in the diversities of the city's political ways and systems and in the strategic advantages of controlling blocs of voters. James retired in 1910 and died the next year after he had named Tom as his successor. After his brother's death, Tom Pendergast served in the city council until he stepped down in 1916 to focus on consolidating the factions of the Jackson County Democratic Party.

In 1925 a new city charter was passed that placed the city under the auspices of a city manager picked by a smaller council. Though the charter had been intended to free Kansas City of political bossism, Pendergast's candidates were able to win five of the nine seats on the council, allowing Pendergast to gain control of the city government.

Pendergast married Caroline Snyder in February 1911 and raised three children (two girls and a boy) at their home on 5650 Ward Parkway. He was a member of the Knights of Columbus, which used his connection to reach Truman during the 1930s persecution of Catholics and others in Mexico.

== Chairman of Jackson County Democratic Club ==
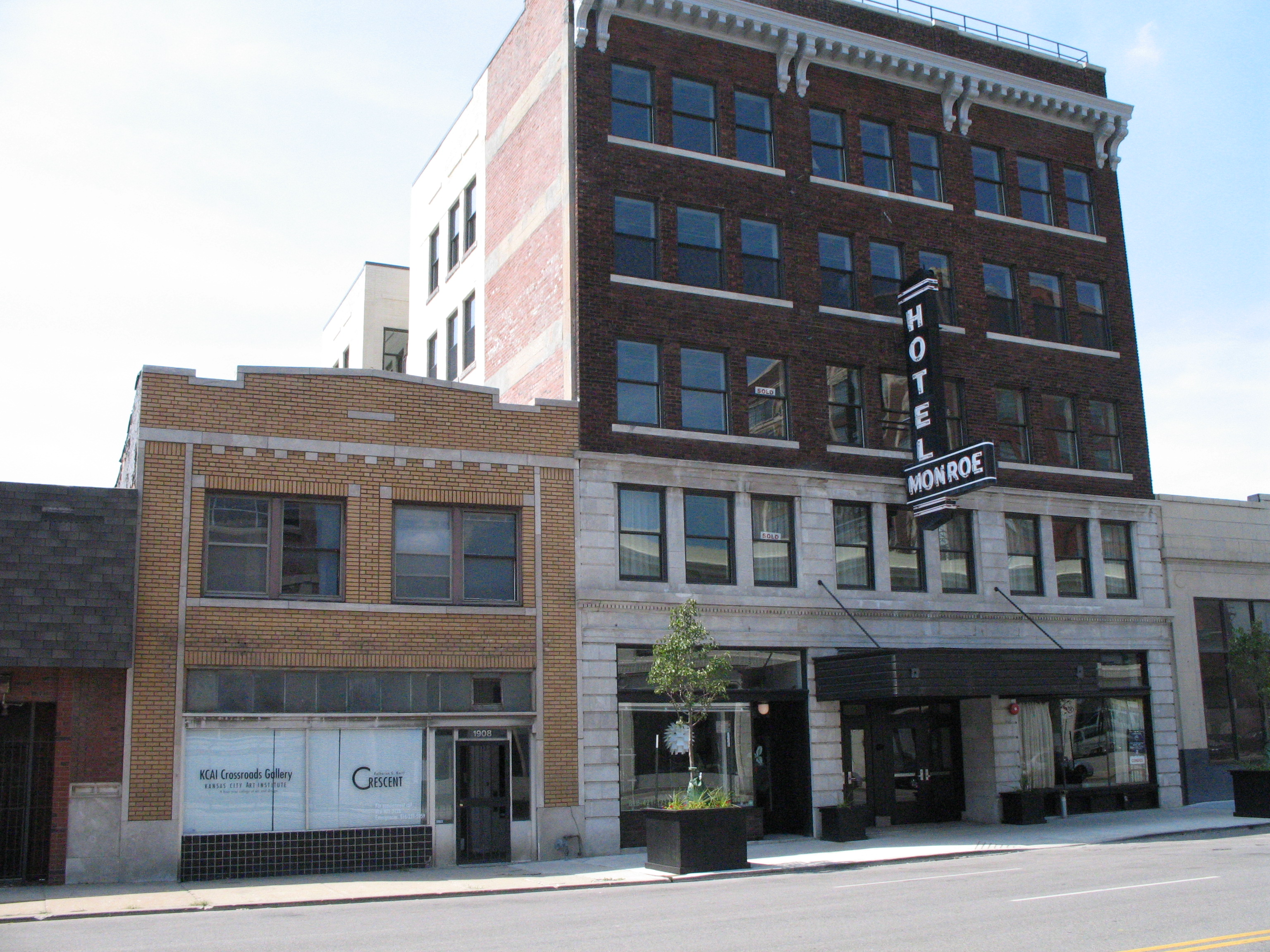
Pendergast ruled from the second floor of the nondescript yellow brick building at 1908 Main Street. The adjacent Monroe Hotel was also owned by Pendergast and is listed on the National Register of Historic Places. The photo is from August 2006.

Pendergast ruled from a simple two-story yellow brick building at 1908 Main Street. Messages marked with his red scrawl were used to secure all manner of favors. He was unquestionably corrupt, and there were regularly shootouts and beatings on election days during his watch. However, the permissive go-go days also gave rise to the golden era of Kansas City jazz (now commemorated at the American Jazz Museum at 18th and Vine) as well as a golden era of building in Kansas City. Pendergast tried to portray a "common touch" and made attention-grabbing displays of helping pay medical bills, providing "jobs", and hosting famous Thanksgiving and Christmas dinners for the poor. Fraud and intimidation often caused Kansas City voter turnout to be close to 100 percent in the Pendergast days.

Despite Prohibition, Pendergast's machine and a bribed police force allowed alcohol and gambling. Additionally, many elections were fixed to keep political friends in power. In return, Pendergast's companies like Ready-Mixed Concrete were awarded government contracts. Under a $40 million bond program, the city constructed many civic buildings during the Great Depression. Among the projects were the Jackson County Courthouse, in Downtown Kansas City, and the concrete "paving" of Brush Creek, near the Country Club Plaza. (A local urban legend, in which bodies of Pendergast opponents were thought to be buried under the Brush Creek concrete, was finally put to rest when the concrete was torn up for a renewal project in the 1980s, and no bodies were found.) Pendergast also had a hand in other projects like the Power and Light Building, Fidelity Bank and Trust Building, Municipal Auditorium, and the construction of inner-city high schools.

Pendergast placed many of his associates in positions of authority throughout Jackson County and exercised strong influence in determining the Democratic candidates for statewide office. For example, he picked Guy Brasfield Park as the Democratic candidate for Missouri governor in 1932 after the previous candidate, Francis Wilson, died two weeks before the election. Pendergast also extended his rule into neighboring cities such as Omaha, Nebraska, and Wichita, Kansas, where members of his family had set up branches of the Ready-Mixed Concrete company. The Pendergast stamp was to be found in the packing plant industries, local politics, bogus construction contracts, and the jazz scene in those cities as well.

== Downfall and later years ==
Pendergast's downfall was related to a falling out with Missouri Governor Lloyd C. Stark. Pendergast had endorsed Stark, the heir to an agricultural fortune and known for promoting the Golden Delicious variety of apples, for governor in 1936. Pendergast was out of the country during the election, and his followers were even more obvious and corrupt than usual in Stark's successful election. With Mafia-related shootings and election violence underway in Jackson County, U.S. Treasury Secretary Henry Morgenthau Jr. went after a Mafia boss, Charles Carrollo, and Pendergast as part of Morgenthau's crackdown on corruption and organized crime. Despite Pendergast's history of delivering votes for Roosevelt and other leading Democrats, Morgenthau directed his subordinates to "let the chips fall where they may". With investigations looming, Stark turned against Pendergast, which prompted federal investigations and the pulling of federal funds from Pendergast's control. In 1939 Edward L. Schneider, the secretary-treasurer of eight of the Pendergast businesses, killed himself.

Another factor in the downfall was Pendergast's failing health. Shortly after attending the Democratic National Convention in Philadelphia in 1936, he took ill and was later diagnosed with colon cancer, remaining in poor health for the rest of his life. In 1938, the tax officials and U.S. attorneys began investigating Tom Pendergast for tax evasion after he failed to pay taxes on $440,000 in bribes he had received in 1935 and 1936 from insurance companies. He was indicted in May 1939, and after serving 15 months in prison at the nearby United States Penitentiary, Leavenworth, he lived quietly at his home at 5650 Ward Parkway. Pendergast died of a heart attack on January 26, 1945, at Menorah Medical Center, which at the time was located in Kansas City, Missouri. He was buried at Calvary Cemetery in Kansas City.

Pendergast's headquarters at 1908 Main is listed on the Kansas City Register of Historic Places.

== Truman connection ==
During his military service during World War I, Harry Truman had become close friends with Jim Pendergast, T. J.'s nephew. When Truman's attempt at a clothing business failed in 1922, Jim Pendergast suggested that he run for a "judgeship" in eastern Jackson County (actually an administrative, rather than a judicial position). With the help of the Pendergast organization, Truman was elected to that and later to a similar county-wide position. In 1934, after several other potential candidates turned him down, T. J. was persuaded to support Truman, whom he considered something of a lightweight, for the Democratic nomination for a US Senate seat. Truman prevailed in a close primary and went on to win in the general election. Although Truman was derisively named "the senator from Pendergast" by his opponents, he does not appear to have had a close personal relationship with Pendergast himself. Both men met on only a handful of occasions and were photographed together only once, at the 1936 Democratic Party convention.

After Pendergast was convicted of income tax evasion, Missouri Governor Lloyd C. Stark sought to unseat Truman in the 1940 US Senate election. It was a very bitter campaign, which made both men lifelong enemies. Truman was re-elected after US Attorney Maurice Milligan, who had prosecuted Pendergast, also entered the race, which caused Milligan and Stark to split the anti-Pendergast vote.

In his second term as Senator, with Pendergast out of power and World War II underway, Truman was finally able to shake his association with the Pendergast machine and build a national reputation as a military spending reformer. In early 1945, the newly-inaugurated Vice President shocked many when he attended Pendergast’s funeral. He was reportedly the only elected official who attended. Truman brushed aside the criticism and said simply: "He was always my friend and I have always been his." On April 12, 1945, Franklin D. Roosevelt died in office and Pendergast's one-time protégé became the 33rd President of the United States.

== Legacy ==
Two of his biographers have summed up Pendergast's uniqueness as a political boss:

Pendergast may bear comparison to various big-city bosses, but his open alliance with hardened criminals, his cynical subversion of the democratic process, his monarchistic style of living, his increasingly insatiable gambling habit, his grasping for a business empire, and his promotion of Kansas City as a wide-open town with every kind of vice imaginable, combined with his professed compassion for the poor and very real role as city builder, made him bigger than life, difficult to characterize.

== See also ==
- Alcohol laws of Missouri
- E. H. Crump
- Byrd Organization
