= Gainesville station (Texas) =

Railway station in Gainesville, Texas

Gainesville, TX
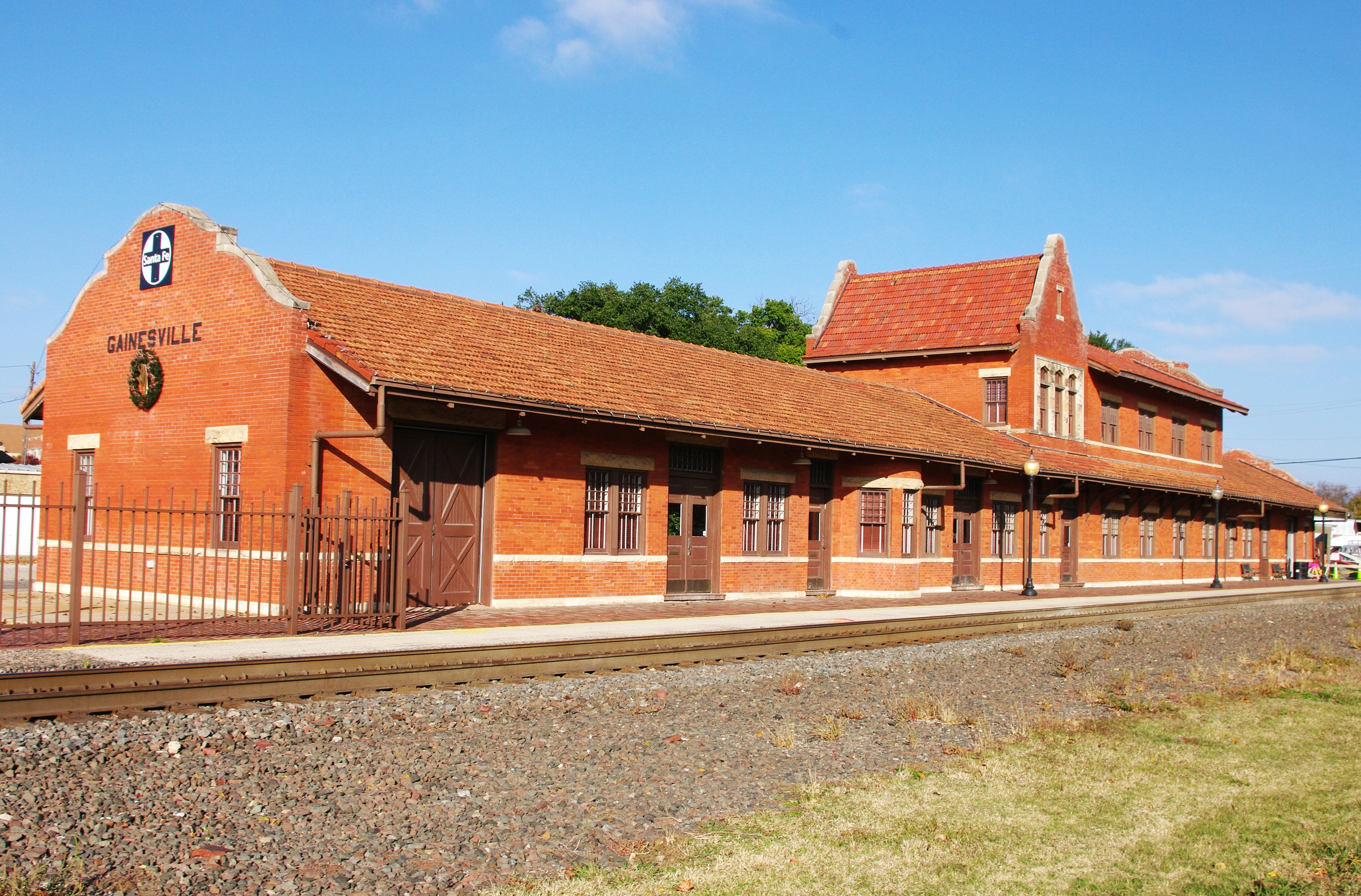

General information
- Location: 605 East California Street; Gainesville, Texas; United States
- Coordinates: 33°37′30″N 97°08′27″W
- Platforms: 1 side platform
- Tracks: 1

Construction
- Parking: Yes
- Accessible: Yes

Other information
- Station code: Amtrak: GLE

History
- Opened: 1902

Passengers
- FY 2025: 7,032 (Amtrak)

Services
Preceding station	Amtrak	Following station
Fort Worth Terminus	Heartland Flyer	Ardmore toward Oklahoma City
Former services
Preceding station	Amtrak	Following station
Fort Worth toward Dallas or Houston	Lone Star	Ardmore toward Chicago
Preceding station	Atchison, Topeka and Santa Fe Railway	Following station
Thackerville toward Purcell	Gulf, Colorado and Santa Fe Railway Main Line	Valley View toward Galveston
- Santa Fe Passenger Depot
- U.S. National Register of Historic Places
- Recorded Texas Historic Landmark
- Area: less than one acre
- Built: 1902
- Architect: C.W. Felt
- NRHP reference No.: 83003757
- RTHL No.: 4580

Significant dates
- Added to NRHP: October 6, 1983
- Designated RTHL: 1983
Location

Gainesville (Amtrak: GLE), officially the Gainesville Santa Fe Depot, is an Amtrak train station in Gainesville, Texas. The station is serviced by Amtrak's Heartland Flyer route, which travels from Fort Worth, Texas to Oklahoma City, Oklahoma.

== History ==
The station was built in 1902 as a depot for the Gulf, Colorado and Santa Fe Railway (now BNSF Railway), replacing a smaller frame structure constructed in the 1890s. The new depot was built from reddish orange brick with curvilinear gables, stone trim, and a Ludowici tile roof.

Like many Santa Fe stations of the time, the first floor was populated by a Harvey House restaurant, which operated until 1931. The station was a major destination during World War II due to its proximity to Camp Howze, a major infantry training facility. In 1944, Gainesville was the eighth-most travelled station on the Santa Fe Railway.

Passenger rail travel declined following the end of World War II due to the increasing popularity of automobile travel, which serviced Gainesville through U.S. Route 77 (and later Interstate 35). Passenger rail service ceased on December 5, 1979, with the discontinuation of Amtrak's Lone Star train. The railway deeded the depot to the city on October 19, 1981, and it was added to the National Register of Historic Places in 1983.

On June 15, 1999, the station was brought into service once again for Amtrak's new Heartland Flyer service. The station house underwent a restoration, which was completed on October 6, 2001.

Currently, the station's first floor is a branch of the Morton Museum of Cooke County, which contains memorabilia for the railroad, Harvey House, Coca-Cola, and the Gainesville Community Circus. The second floor contains a replica of Harvey House's employee quarters, as well as city offices.

== See also ==
- National Register of Historic Places listings in Cooke County, Texas
- Recorded Texas Historic Landmarks in Cooke County
