= Ardmore station (Oklahoma) =

Railway station in Ardmore, Oklahoma

Ardmore, OK
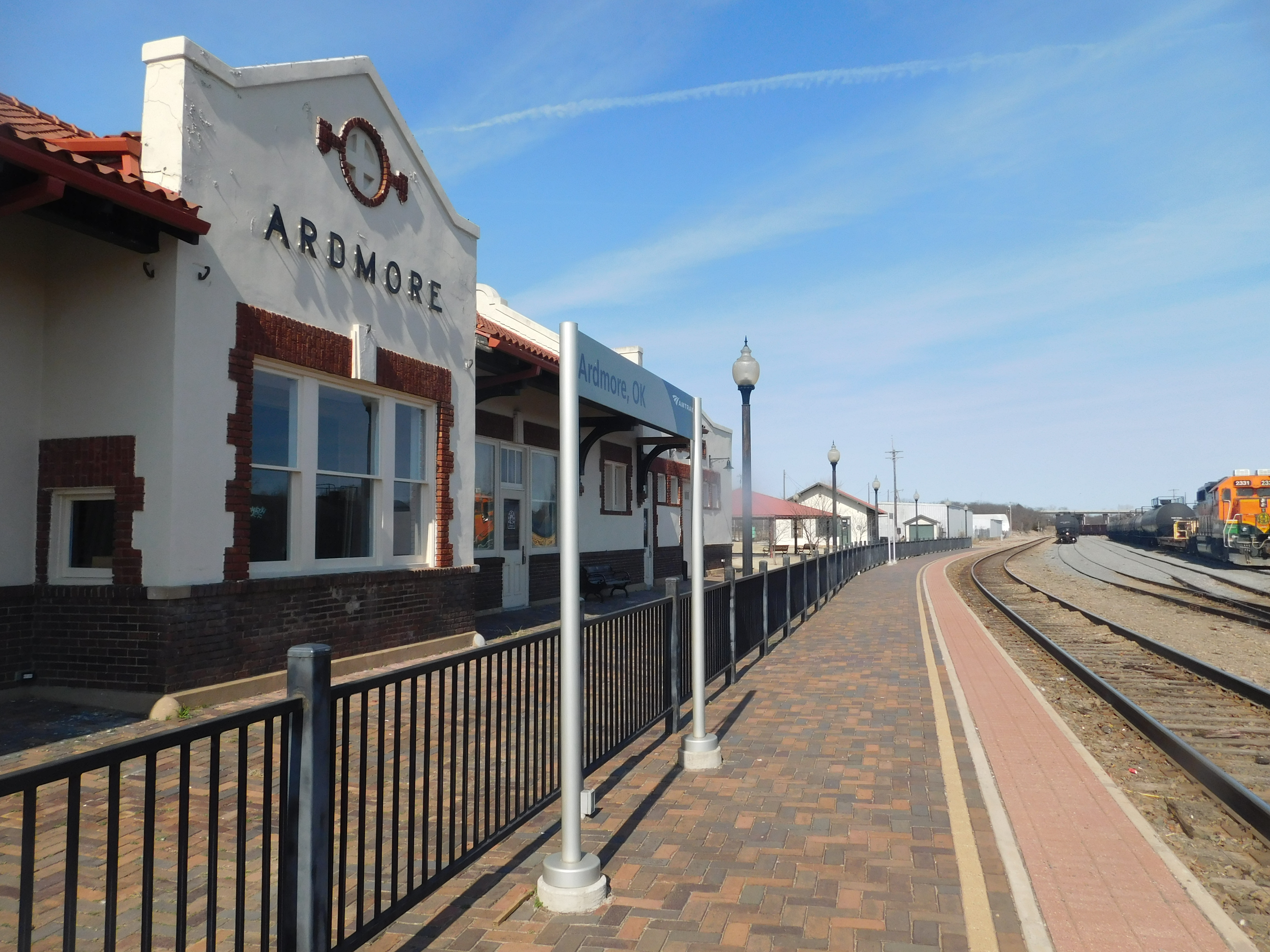
- Ardmore station in February 2017

General information
- Location: 251 East Main Street; Ardmore, Oklahoma; United States
- Coordinates: 34.1721°N 97.1255°W
- Owner: City of Ardmore
- Line: BNSF Railway Red Rock Subdivision
- Platforms: 1 side platform
- Tracks: 2

Construction
- Accessible: yes

Other information
- Station code: Amtrak code: ADM

History
- Opened: 1909
- Rebuilt: November 16, 1915–August 7, 1917

Key dates
- September 27, 1915: Depot destroyed in explosion

Passengers
- FY 2025: 6,553 (Amtrak)

Services
Preceding station	Amtrak	Following station
Gainesville toward Fort Worth	Heartland Flyer	Pauls Valley toward Oklahoma City
Former services
Preceding station	Amtrak	Following station
Gainesville toward Dallas or Houston	Lone Star	Pauls Valley toward Chicago
Preceding station	Atchison, Topeka and Santa Fe Railway	Following station
Berwyn toward Purcell	Gulf, Colorado and Santa Fe Railway Main Line	Marietta toward Galveston
Long Grove toward Ringling or Healdton	Ringling – Ardmore	Terminus
Location

Ardmore (Amtrak: ADM) is an Amtrak train station in Ardmore, Oklahoma. The station is serviced by the daily Heartland Flyer, which travels from Oklahoma City, Oklahoma to Fort Worth, Texas.

The station house is owned by the Ardmore Main Street Authority, which restored the station in 2015. The station currently serves as an event venue. A public park, called Depot Park, was opened on the west side of the station in 2022.

== History ==
=== Original building ===
The first train station in Ardmore was built in 1909 by the Atchison, Topeka and Santa Fe Railway (or simply "Santa Fe").

On September 27, 1915, the building was destroyed in an explosion caused by a natural gas leak, which in turn set off dynamite in nearby freight sheds. The station was totally destroyed, and much of the town was set on fire, resulting in 43 deaths.

A train filled with aid workers, dubbed the "Mercy Train", was sent from Gainesville, Texas in the aftermath of the explosion. Locomotive 1108, which led the Mercy Train, was obtained by the city after it exited service in 1954; it is currently on display in Depot Park.

=== Current building ===
Construction of a replacement depot began shortly after the explosion, with railcars serving as a temporary replacement. The rebuilt station was completed in 1917 as a joint effort between the Santa Fe and Rock Island Railroad. A small building for the Railway Express Agency was built just north of the station.

In 1979, Amtrak discontinued its Lone Star service, ending passenger service to the city, though freight service remained.

In 1998, Burlington Northern and Santa Fe Railway, the successor to the original Santa Fe, sold the station and surrounding land, including the REA building, to the city's Main Street Authority for $20,001. BNSF retained ownership of the track and platform, and it continues to operate from the REA building.

On June 15, 1999, Amtrak's Heartland Flyer debuted, returning the station to service.
