= Pauls Valley station =

Railway station in Pauls Valley, Oklahoma

Pauls Valley, OK
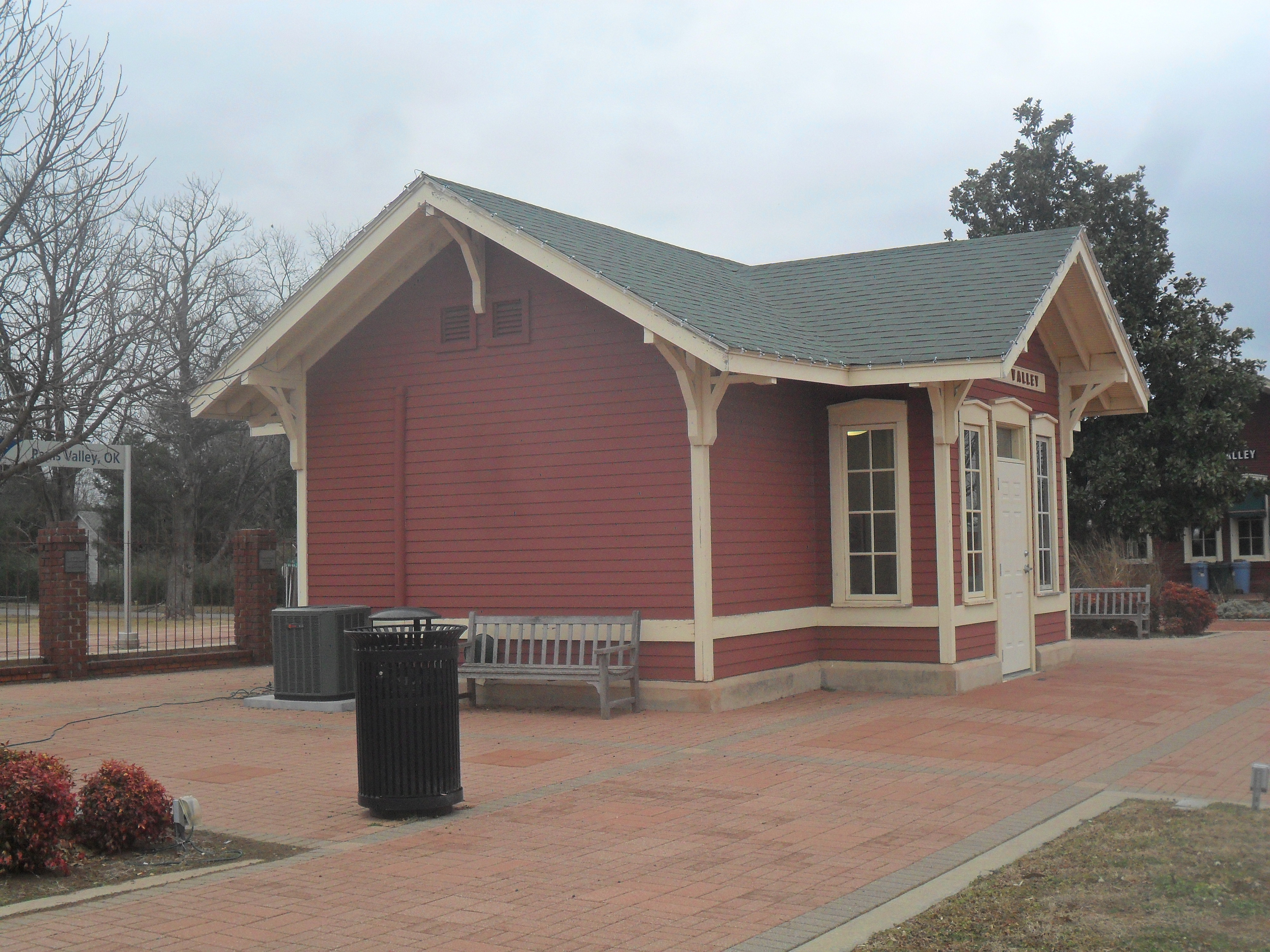
- Pauls Valley station in January 2018

General information
- Location: 1 Santa Fe Plaza; Pauls Valley, Oklahoma
- Coordinates: 34.7418°N 97.2184°W
- Platforms: 1 side platform
- Tracks: 1

Other information
- Station code: Amtrak: PVL

History
- Opened: 1903, 1999
- Closed: 1979
- Rebuilt: 2002

Passengers
- FY 2025: 3,260 (Amtrak)

Services
Preceding station	Amtrak	Following station
Ardmore toward Fort Worth	Heartland Flyer	Purcell toward Oklahoma City
Former services
Preceding station	Amtrak	Following station
Ardmore toward Dallas or Houston	Lone Star	Purcell toward Chicago
Preceding station	Atchison, Topeka and Santa Fe Railway	Following station
Wayne toward Purcell	Gulf, Colorado and Santa Fe Railway Main Line	Wynnewood toward Galveston
Maysville toward Lindsay	Lindsay – Shawnee	Byars toward Shawnee
Terminus	Pauls Valley – Ada	Byars toward Ada
Location

Pauls Valley (Amtrak: PVL) is an Amtrak station in Pauls Valley, Oklahoma. The station is serviced by the daily Heartland Flyer, which travels from Oklahoma City, Oklahoma to Fort Worth, Texas.

== History ==
The city's first rail station was opened in 1903 by the Atchison, Topeka and Santa Fe Railway (now BNSF Railway). It received passenger service from opening until 1933, then again from 1948 to 1979 through the Texas Chief route (later renamed Lone Star).

In 1984, the station was nominated for the National Register of Historic Places alongside another Santa Fe depot in Lindsay, but the nomination was rejected. Both stations later received separate nominations in 1985 and 1986, which were approved.

In 1985, the Santa Fe planned to demolish the station, but the Pauls Valley Historical Society successfully lobbied to preserve the building. It was purchased by the city in 1989 and was restored in 1991. It currently serves as a museum operated by the Historical Society, whose collection includes a Santa Fe locomotive and a Frisco Line caboose.

After the Heartland Flyer began service in 1999, the city built a new station house with federal TEA-21 funding, which opened in June 2002. The small structure, consisting only of a waiting room, has a façade reminiscent of the Santa Fe station. A $5 million renovation, completed in 2026, included a 290-foot (88 m)-long brick-paved platform.

== Gallery ==
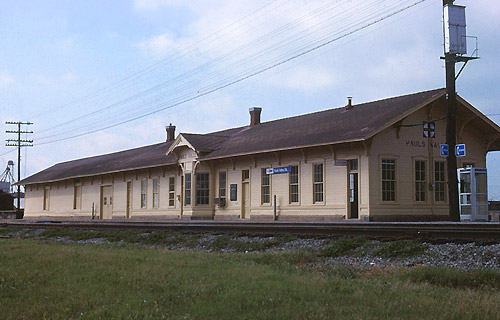
The former station in Amtrak use in 1977

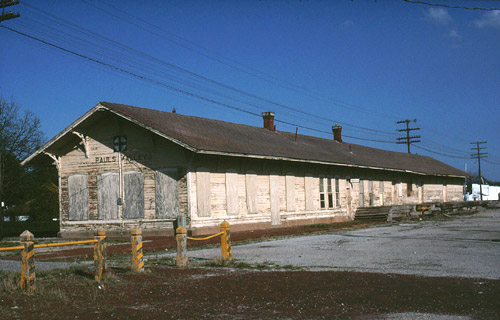
The former station in 1991, prior to restoration

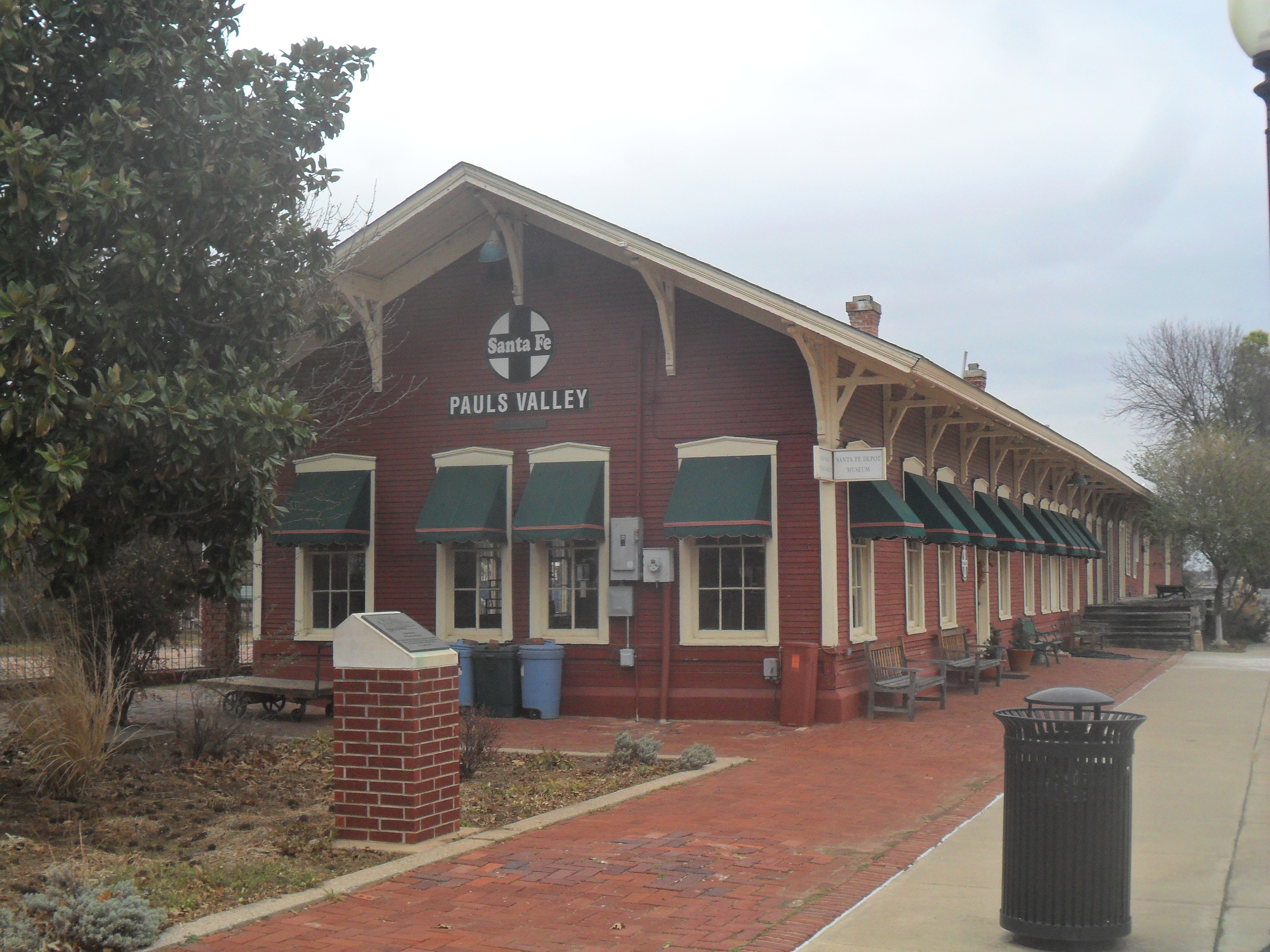
The restored former station in 2018
