= Guthrie station =

Train station in Guthrie, Oklahoma, U.S.

Guthrie, OK
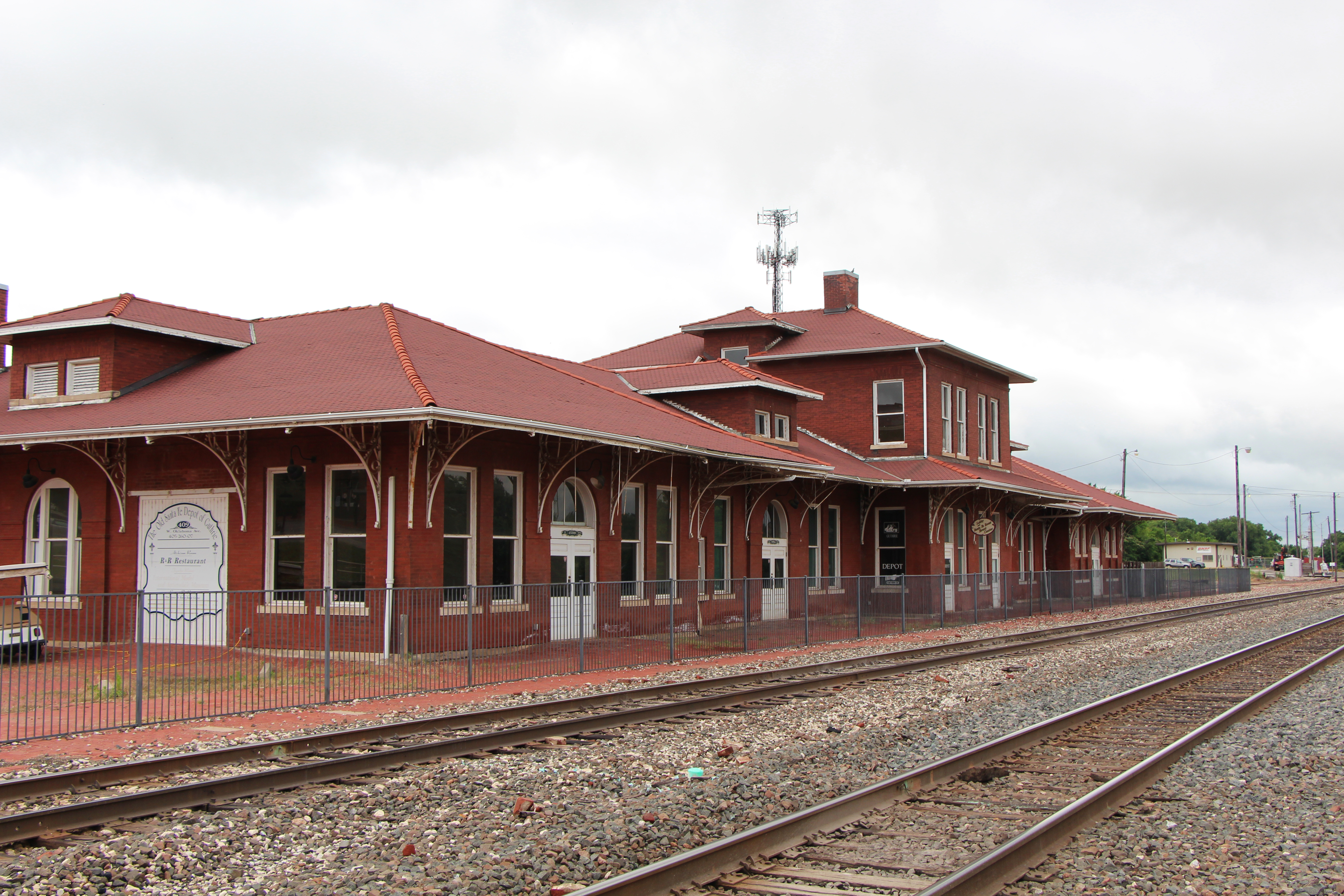
- The former Guthrie station in June 2015.

General information
- Location: 409 West Oklahoma Avenue; Guthrie, Oklahoma
- Coordinates: 35°52′39″N 97°25′47″W
- Line: Red Rock Subdivision

History
- Closed: October 8, 1979

Former services
Preceding station	Amtrak	Following station
Oklahoma City toward Dallas or Houston	Lone Star	Perry toward Chicago
Preceding station	Atchison, Topeka and Santa Fe Railway	Following station
Lawrie toward Newton	Newton – Purcell	Seward toward Purcell
- Union Station
- U.S. Historic district – Contributing property
- Part of: Guthrie Historic District (ID74001664)
- Designated CP: June 13, 1974
Location

Guthrie station is a former railway station in Guthrie, Oklahoma. Built in 1903, it saw passenger service until 1979 and is now a restaurant. The building is a contributing resource of the Guthrie Historic District.

== History ==
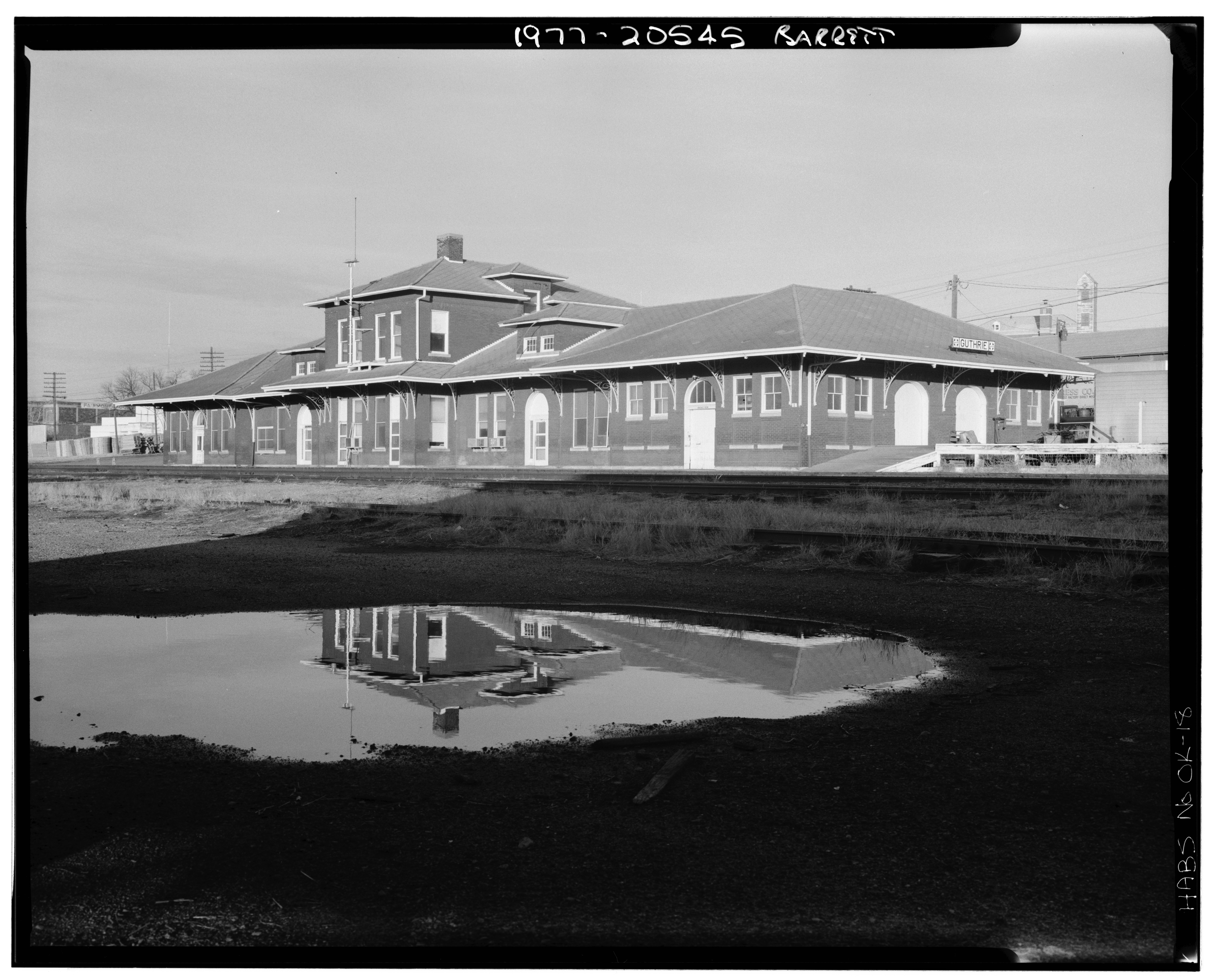
Guthrie station in 1977

The station building is 185 feet (56 m) long and 85 feet (26 m) wide at its widest point. It covers an area of 9,000 square feet (840 m^{2}). Unlike most frame depots of its time, it is a red brick depot, with a two-story section at the center and one-story wings to each side. Waitresses for the Harvey House lived in the second story. The station lobby was in the middle of the ground floor, and was reached by doors on both the east and west sides of the building.

Passenger service by the Atchison, Topeka and Santa Fe Railway ran until 1971. Amtrak continued operation of the Texas Chief, which was renamed Lone Star in 1974. The Lone Star was discontinued on October 8, 1979.

In June 2021, Amtrak released a plan that would add two more Heartland Flyer round trips between Oklahoma City, Oklahoma and Fort Worth, Texas, while extending one round trip to Newton, Kansas. The extended round trip would bring Amtrak service back to Guthrie. In November 2023, KDOT said the service would start in 2029, but could begin sooner were the project to be fast tracked.
