= Union Station (Wichita, Kansas) =

Wichita Union Station
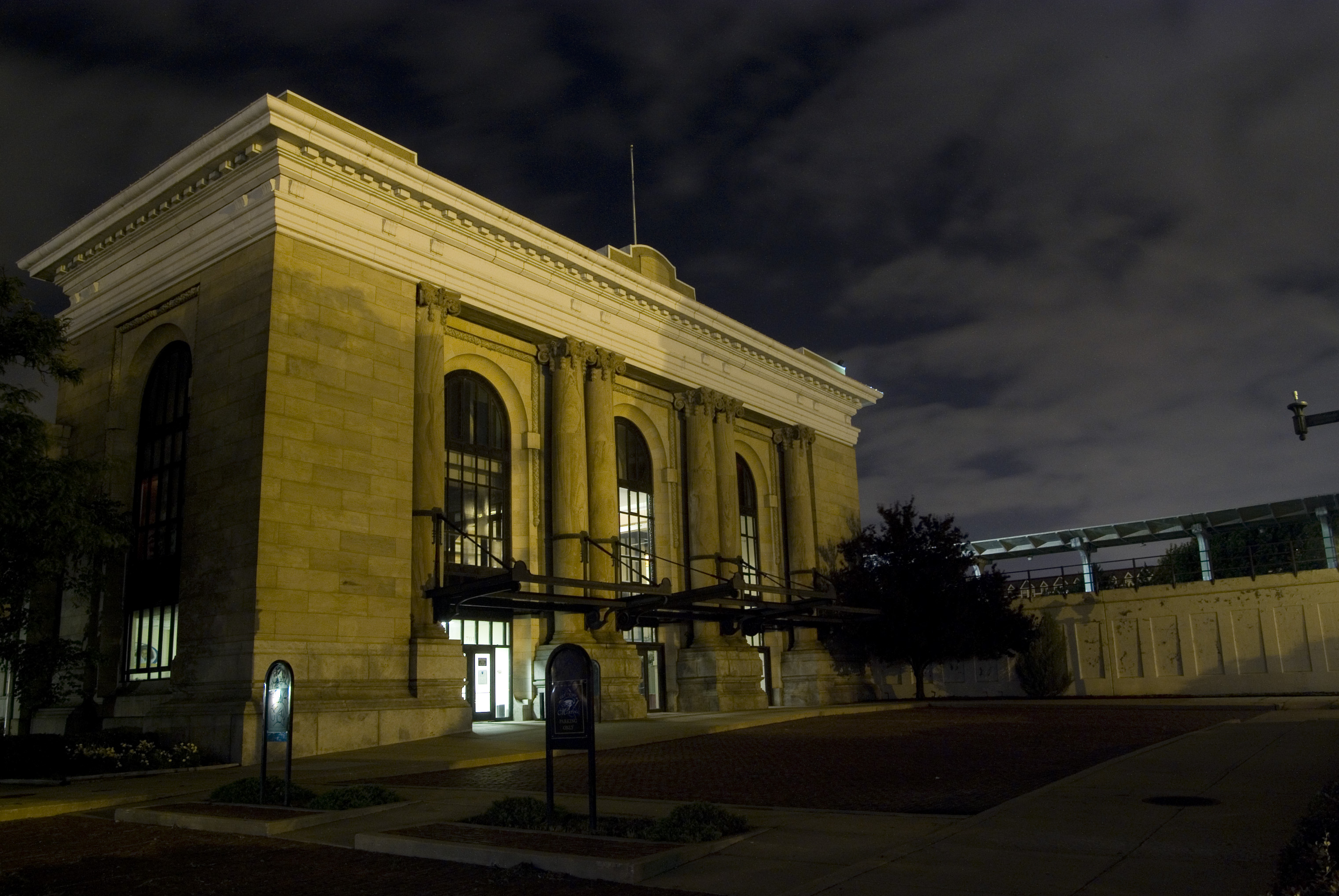
- Union Station terminal building (2009)

General information
- Location: 701 East Douglas Avenue; Wichita, Kansas
- Coordinates: 37°41′08″N 97°19′46″W
- Owner: Occidental Management

Other information
- Status: Repurposed as commercial office space

History
- Opened: 1914
- Closed: 1979
Former services
Preceding station	Amtrak	Following station
Arkansas City toward Dallas or Houston	Lone Star	Newton toward Chicago
Preceding station	Atchison, Topeka and Santa Fe Railway	Following station
Valley Center toward Newton	Newton – Purcell	Derby toward Purcell
Prospect toward Belen	Main Line Belen Cutoff	Terminus
Prospect toward San Angelo	San Angelo – Wichita	Terminus
Prospect toward Englewood	Englewood – Wichita	Terminus
Tyler toward Pratt	Pratt – Wichita	Terminus
Preceding station	St. Louis–San Francisco Railway	Following station
North Wichita toward Ellsworth	Ellsworth – Monett	Minneha toward Monett
Preceding station	Chicago, Rock Island and Pacific Railroad	Following station
Haysville toward Teague	Teague – Minneapolis	Kechi toward Minneapolis
Location

Union Station is a former railway station in Wichita, Kansas. Since the end of passenger rail service to the city in 1979, it has been repurposed as commercial office space.

== History ==
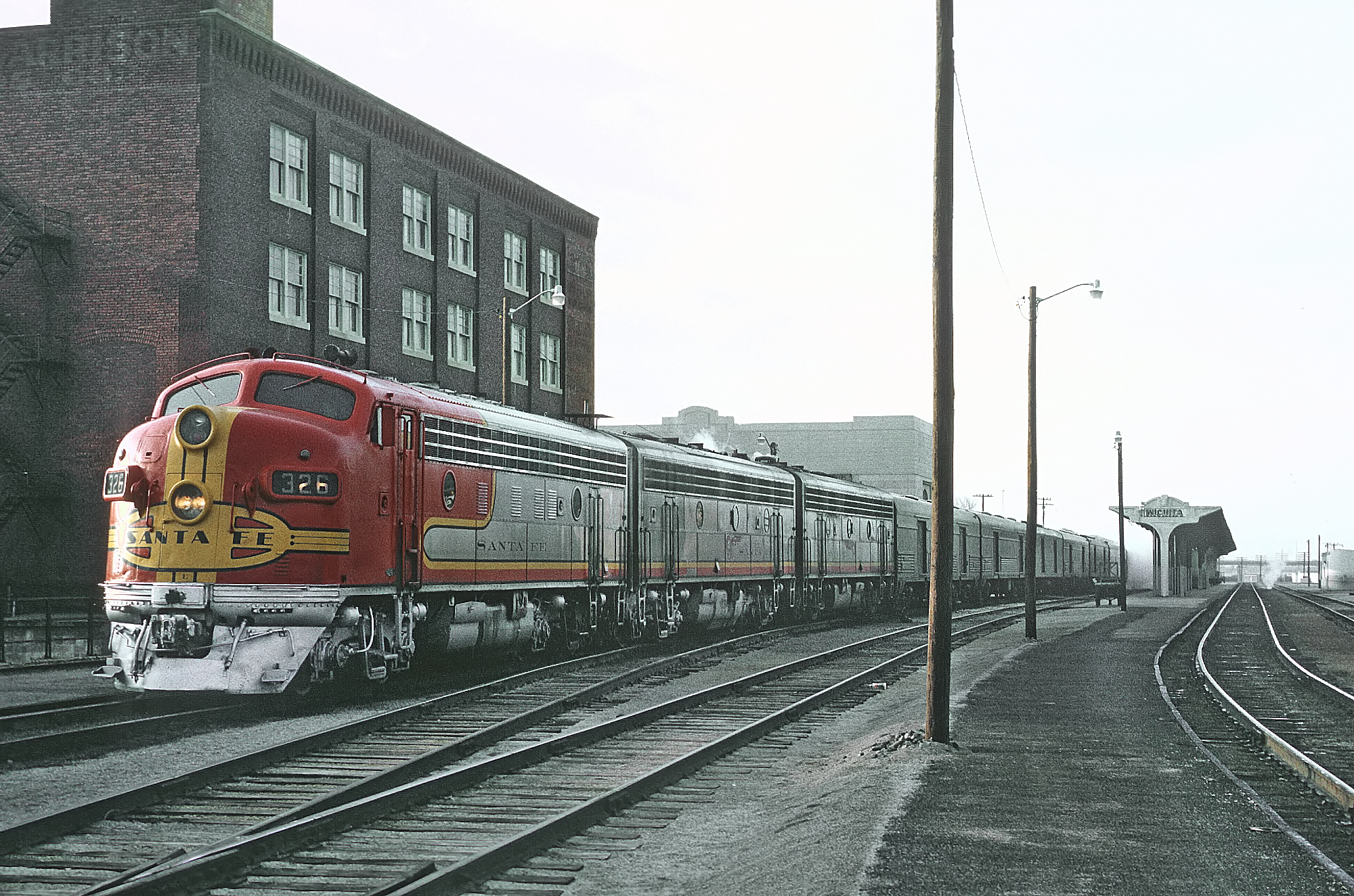
The Santa Fe Chicagoan at the station in 1967

The station opened in 1914 at a cost of $2.5 million. Through the 1930s, it served as the city's primary arrival and departure point. Railroads including the Frisco, Santa Fe, and Rock Island offered passenger service to and from cities including Chicago, Los Angeles and St. Louis.

The station closed in 1979 when Amtrak discontinued its Lone Star (Chicago–Houston) line, ending passenger rail access to the city. The nearest inter-city station is in Newton, 25 miles north, which is served by the Southwest Chief (Chicago–Los Angeles).

The station terminal and nearby buildings have since been redeveloped as a commercial office and retail campus. Cox Communications used the station as its local headquarters until 2007. In 2013, local commercial real estate company Occidental Management purchased Union Station and began renovations. As of 2017, renovations continue while Occidental has resumed leasing commercial space in the neighboring buildings. The building's restoration was estimated at $54 million. Phase Two included the addition of 150,000 square feet of retail, restaurant and office space on the property's south side.

In recent years, several proposals have been made to bring back Amtrak service back to Wichita. This has predominantly surrounded the plan to extend the Heartland Flyer, which currently runs between Oklahoma City, Oklahoma and Fort Worth, Texas, north to Newton, Kansas. In June 2021, Amtrak released a plan that would add two more round trips between Oklahoma City and Fort Worth while extending the original round trip to Newton. In November 2023, KDOT said the service would start in 2029, but could begin sooner were the project to be fast tracked.
