= Norman station =

Railway station in Norman, Oklahoma

Norman, OK
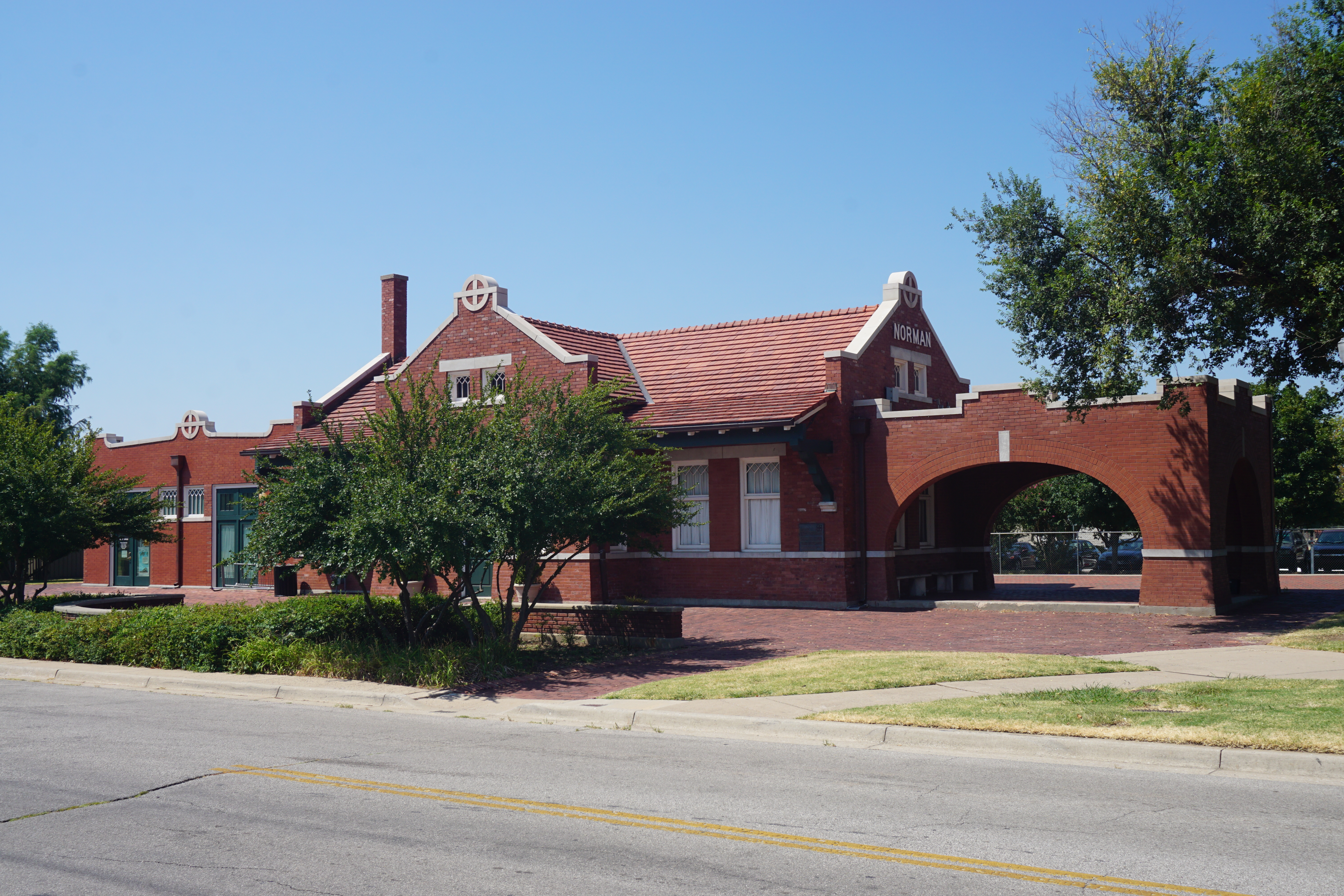
- Norman station in July 2019

General information
- Location: 200 South Jones Avenue; Norman, Oklahoma; United States
- Coordinates: 35°13′11.64″N 97°26′35.16″W
- Owner: City of Norman
- Line: BNSF Red Rock Subdivision
- Platforms: 1 side platform
- Tracks: 1

Construction
- Parking: Yes
- Accessible: Yes

Other information
- Station code: Amtrak: NOR

History
- Opened: June 13, 1887; June 1999
- Closed: October 9, 1979
- Rebuilt: 1909; 2003

Passengers
- FY 2025: 13,858 (Amtrak)

Services
Preceding station	Amtrak	Following station
Purcell toward Fort Worth	Heartland Flyer	Oklahoma City Terminus
Former services
Preceding station	Amtrak	Following station
Purcell toward Dallas or Houston	Lone Star	Oklahoma City toward Chicago
Preceding station	Atchison, Topeka and Santa Fe Railway	Following station
Purcell Terminus	Oklahoma Division First District	Moore toward Arkansas City
- Santa Fe Depot
- U.S. National Register of Historic Places
- Built: 1909
- Built by: Atchison, Topeka, and Santa Fe Railway
- Architect: Lungsren & Carlson
- Architectural style: Mission Revival/Spanish Revival
- NRHP reference No.: 90002203
- Added to NRHP: January 25, 1991
Location

Norman (Amtrak: NOR) is an Amtrak station in Norman, Oklahoma. The station is serviced by the daily Heartland Flyer, which travels from Fort Worth, Texas to Oklahoma City, Oklahoma. The station building was added to the National Register of Historic Places in 1991 as the Santa Fe Depot.

Since 2003, in addition to servicing Amtrak, the building houses The Depot, a nonprofit art gallery and performing arts center.

== History ==
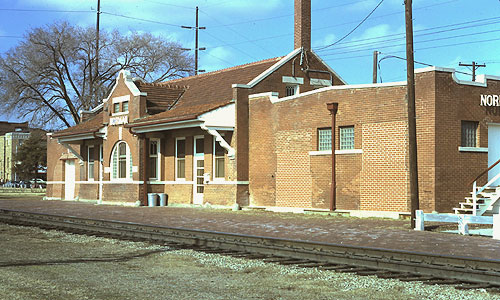
Norman station in March 1973

In 1887, the Atchison, Topeka and Santa Fe Railway (a.k.a. Santa Fe, now BNSF Railway) constructed a route connecting Oklahoma City to its Gulf, Colorado and Santa Fe division in Purcell. This route passed through Norman's Camp, a surveying camp established in 1872 and named for its leader, Abner E. Norman. The Santa Fe established stations approximately every 10 miles (16 km) along the route, including one at Norman's Camp; however, the station's name was shortened to simply "Norman".

The first train, traveling northbound, arrived at the new station on June 13, 1887, with a townsite for Santa Fe employees established in the surrounding area. On April 22, 1889, as part of the larger Land Rush of 1889, the townsite was officially opened for permanent white settlement.

The first station building, just 16 square feet (1.5 m^{2}) in size, was located on Eufala Street. It was quickly deemed too small and replaced with a larger structure just to the south in 1890. Both of these structures were later demolished.

The present station building was constructed in 1909 following local requests for a larger station. The station is built in the Mission Revival architectural style. Santa Fe stations were typically built out of wood, but the Norman station was built out of brick with limestone trim, which was standard practice for Santa Fe stations in county seats.

The station served Santa Fe trains, most notably the Texas Chief, until May 1971, when Amtrak took over intercity passenger service in the United States. Amtrak continued to serve Norman with the Texas Chief (renamed Lone Star in 1974) until it was discontinued on October 9, 1979. Ownership of the station was transferred to the city in October 1986. The station building was reopened as a community space in 1990.

The Heartland Flyer began service in June 1999, returning the station to active service. A $480,000 renovation in 2003 made the station accessible. A $3 million accessibility renovation completed in mid-2026 included a 300-foot (90 m)-long brick-paved platform.
