= Beach, Texas =

Beach
- Unincorporated community
- Interactive map of Beach
- Location within Texas Beach (the United States)
- Coordinates: 30°19′12″N 95°25′17″W
- Country: United States
- State: Texas
- County: Montgomery County

Beach is a populated unincorporated place located in Montgomery County, Texas, United States.

== History ==
Beach was established in the late 1800s by Isaac Conroe as a sawmill town for the timber industry and a stop on the Gulf, Colorado and Santa Fe Railway. A large scale establishment that contained a comissary, offices, and dorms was then erected upon the area. 1930s highway maps displayed Beach as a community with residences, businesses, and a church, but by 1990s the community had faded away from highway maps.
