= Bagby, Texas =

Unincorporated community in Texas, US

- Unincorporated community
- Location in Texas
- Coordinates: 33.4845509°N 95.9194114°W
- Country: United States
- State: Texas
- County: Walker
- Elevation: 564 ft (172 m)

Bagby is an unincorporated community in Fannin County, Texas, United States. Situated on Farm to Market Road 1550, it was established on a stop of the Gulf, Colorado and Santa Fe Railway in 1895. Primarily agricultural, the community peaked in the 1900s, with a post office operating from 1900 to 1904. Its railroad closed in 1944, and the town has been mostly dispersed since.
