= Heartland Flyer =

Amtrak service between Oklahoma City, OK and Fort Worth, TX

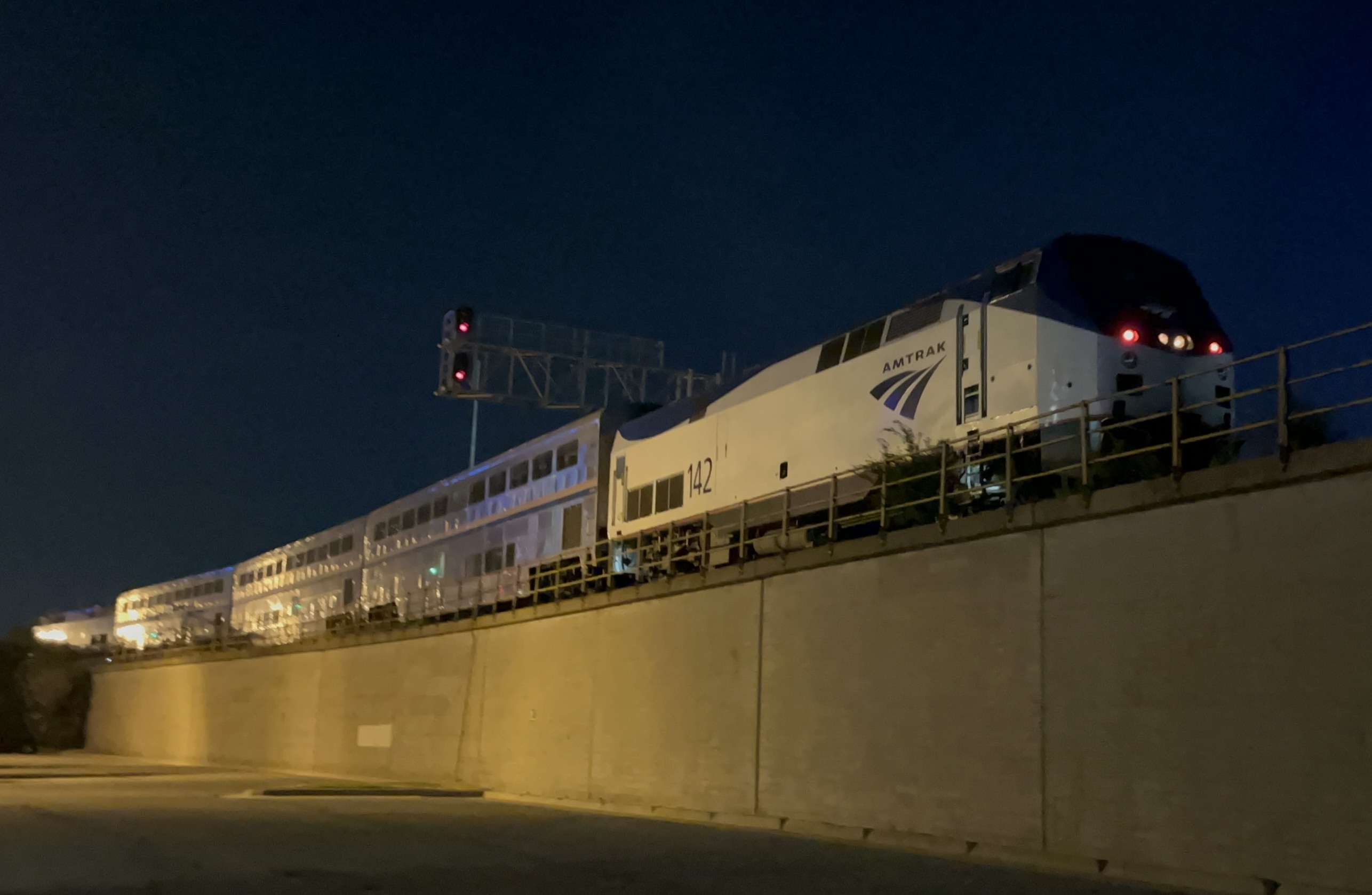
- The Heartland Flyer at Oklahoma City, Oklahoma, in August 2025

Overview
- Service type: Inter-city rail
- Locale: Oklahoma and Texas
- First service: June 14, 1999
- Current operator: Amtrak
- Annual ridership: 80,876 (FY 25) ▲0.6% (Note: Amtrak's Fiscal Year (FY) runs from October 1 of the prior year to September 30 of the named year.)

Route
- Termini: Oklahoma City, Oklahoma; Fort Worth, Texas
- Stops: 7
- Distance travelled: 206 miles (332 km)
- Average journey time: 4 hours
- Service frequency: Daily
- Train number: 821, 822

On-board services
- Class: Coach class
- Disabled access: Train lower level, all stations
- Catering facilities: Café (snack coach)
- Baggage facilities: Overhead racks

Technical
- Rolling stock: GE Genesis; Superliner
- Track gauge: 4 ft 8 1/2 in (1,435 mm) standard gauge
- Operating speed: 52 mph (84 km/h) (avg.); 79 mph (127 km/h) (top)
- Track owner: BNSF

The Heartland Flyer is a daily passenger train that follows a 206-mile (332 km) route between Oklahoma City, Oklahoma, and Fort Worth, Texas. It is operated by Amtrak and was jointly funded by the states of Oklahoma and Texas.

The train's daily round-trip begins in Oklahoma City in the morning and reaches Fort Worth in the early afternoon. It leaves Fort Worth during the afternoon rush for an evening return to Oklahoma City.

== Operation ==
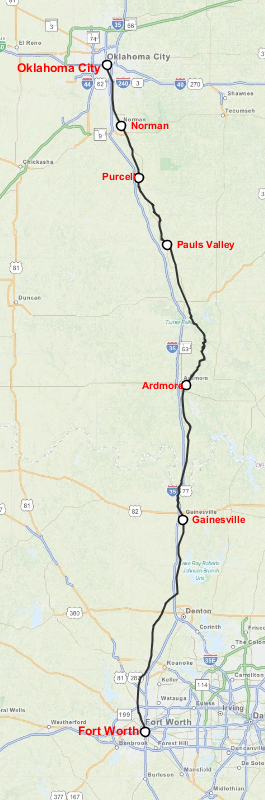
Route of the Heartland Flyer

=== Route ===
The Heartland Flyer runs north-south between Fort Worth Central Station and the Santa Fe Depot in Oklahoma City. The southbound run departs Oklahoma City around mid-morning and arrives in Fort Worth around midday. The northbound run leaves Fort Worth later that afternoon and arrives back in Oklahoma City that night. Its schedule allows passengers to spend an afternoon in Fort Worth without having to spend the night. At its south end, the train connects to the rest of the Amtrak systems to the Texas Eagle. Additionally, there is Thruway bus service between Oklahoma City and Newton, Kansas, with one stop in Wichita. The service connects the train to the Southwest Chief.

The train operates over lines formerly owned by the Atchison, Topeka and Santa Fe Railway before it became the BNSF Railway:

- BNSF Fort Worth Subdivision (ex-ATSF Fort Worth Subdivision), Fort Worth, Texas, to Gainesville, Texas
- BNSF Red Rock Subdivision (ex-ATSF Oklahoma Subdivision), Gainesville, Texas, to Oklahoma City, Oklahoma

Additionally, the train utilizes the Trinity Railway Express commuter line between Fort Worth and Dallas, Texas for its "Big Game Train" runs. Most of the route has a maximum speed limit of 79 mph (127 km/h).

=== Rolling stock ===
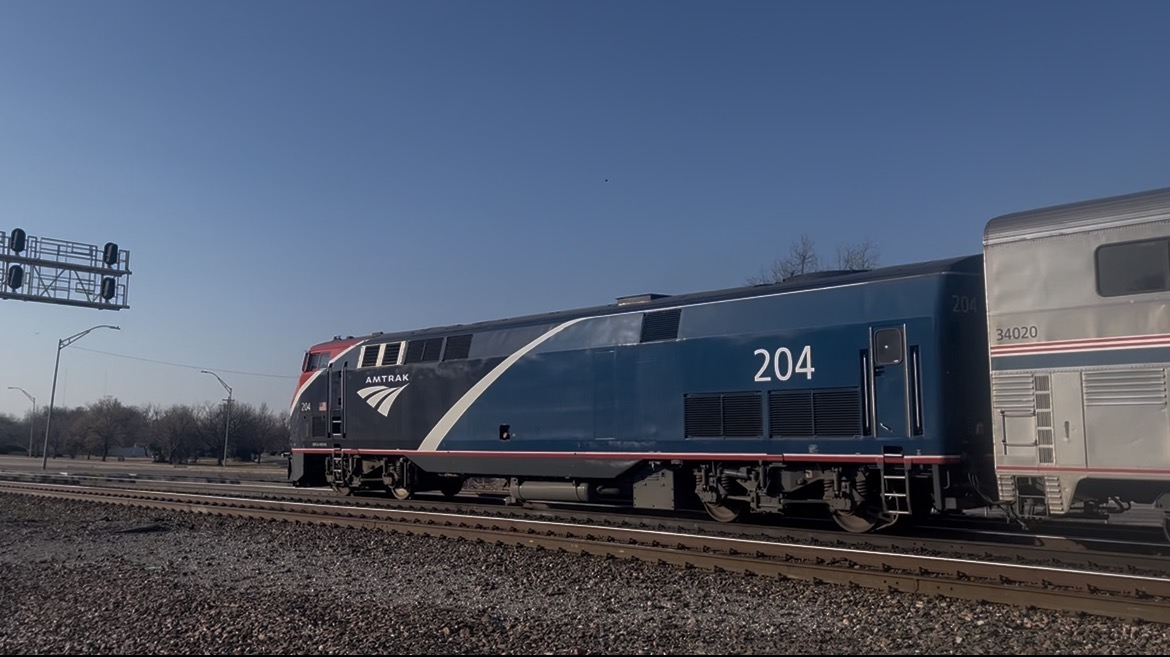
Amtrak #204 in Phase VII paint scheme leading the southbound Heartland Flyer near Oklahoma City, OK, on February 28th, 2026.

The Heartland Flyer uses equipment from Amtrak's national fleet, typically two General Electric Genesis locomotives and two or three Superliner railcars. One of the Superliner cars is a snack coach with seating on the upper level of the car and a small Café area on the lower level. Previously, the Heartland Flyer used a combination of Hi-Level and Superliner railcars.

For many years, the train was powered by a single locomotive with a Non-Powered Control Unit (NPCU) at the opposite end to facilitate bidirectional travel. In 2009, the NPCU was replaced with a standard Genesis P42DC, giving the train locomotive power on both ends. The train returned to having an NPCU in 2015 until an accident in 2017 took one NPCU out of operation so the train alternated between both configurations. It later returned to having locomotive power on both ends.

From April 2010 to April 2011, Amtrak and the Oklahoma Department of Transportation carried out a research project to run the train on a biodiesel blend known as B20 (20% pure biofuel and 80% diesel).

In 2022, Amtrak announced plans to replace its aging fleet of locomotives and railcars over the next ten years. Under the plan, the rolling stock utilized by the Heartland Flyer will be replaced between 2027 and 2032, though the exact trainset has not yet been determined.

==== Big Game Train ====
From the route's inception in 1999, additional cars have been added during the week of the Red River Rivalry football game, which normally coincides with the State Fair of Texas, to accommodate fan travel to and from Dallas, where the game is held. Dubbed the "Big Game Train", this layout originally consisted of one additional coach, but has since been increased to as many as three coaches plus a "Sightseer" lounge. This configuration has been used every year, with the exception of 2020, when the train was cancelled due to the COVID-19 pandemic cancelling the fair.

== History ==
=== Predecessors ===
The rail corridor utilized by the Heartland Flyer was built in 1887 by the Atchison, Topeka and Santa Fe Railway (shortened to the "Santa Fe") to join its Texas-based Gulf, Colorado and Santa Fe subsidiary to the main Santa Fe network. The railroad consisted of two segments: one built south from Arkansas City, Kansas, and one built north from Fort Worth, Texas; the two segments met in modern-day Purcell, Oklahoma. The Land Rush of 1889 followed shortly after, causing many of the railroad stations in Oklahoma to become the centerpieces of permanent settlements; Oklahoma City is a notable example.

The corridor saw use by the Santa Fe for both freight (particularly the movement of cattle) and for passenger rail. Of the passenger routes that used the corridor, the most notable was the Texas Chief, which traveled from Chicago to Galveston.

In 1971, following the Rail Passenger Service Act, the Texas Chief was transferred to the newly-formed Amtrak. The route (renamed to the Lone Star in 1974) remained in service until 1979, when budget cuts at Amtrak caused the route to close. The closure of the Lone Star ended passenger rail service in the state of Oklahoma.

=== Inauguration ===
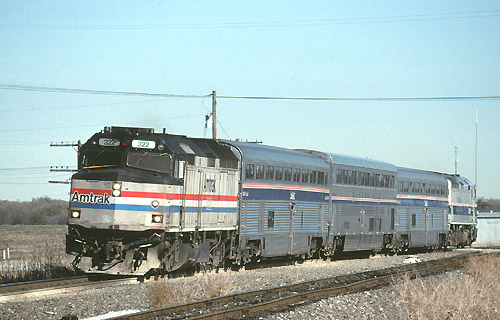
The Heartland Flyer at speed at Metro Junction near Krum, Texas in 2001.

In late 1998, Oklahoma and Kansas state officials began meeting in an effort to restore passenger service along the corridor. Initial plans called for a train from Fort Worth to Kansas City, though this was eventually pared down to the current route for budgetary reasons. On May 18, 1999, Amtrak began taking reservations for the route, tentatively named "The New Train".

Senator Don Nickles sponsored a "Name the Train" contest, encouraging Oklahoma schoolchildren to pick a name for the new route. The winning name was submitted by 11-year-old Katie Moore of Del City, Oklahoma, who christened the new train on its first run.

The Heartland Flyer was inaugurated on June 14, 1999, with a demonstration trip from Fort Worth to Oklahoma City, which carried state officials, Amtrak board members, and mayors for the serviced cities. Regular service began the next day, ending a 20-year absence of passenger rail in Oklahoma and North Texas. First-year ticket sales totaled 71,400 passengers, more than triple Amtrak's projection of 20,000 riders.

=== Regular service ===
The state of Oklahoma initially received $23 million in federal funding for the route, which expired in September 2005. In anticipation of this, on April 11, 2005, a rally was held at the Oklahoma State Capitol to demand that the state fund the train, as well as expand the service to Kansas. Oklahoma City mayor Mick Cornett served as a keynote speaker at the event alongside the mayors of Perry, Guthrie, and Purcell. In response, state lawmakers passed House Bill 1078, which provided an annual $2 million subsidy to continue the service; however, the route was not extended.

The route carried its 500,000th passenger in September 2007 and its millionth in November 2013.

In April 2016, Amtrak began Thruway bus service between the Heartland Flyer in Oklahoma City and the Southwest Chief in Newton, Kansas, with one stop in Wichita. The schedule runs mostly overnight because the Southwest Chief running both eastbound and westbound calls on Newton in the early morning hours. Initial service was operated under contract by Village Tours of Wichita.

On October 15, 2021, the northbound Heartland Flyer struck a car hauler north of Thackerville, Oklahoma. The train partially derailed and four passengers were injured.

Between June 13–18, 2024, the service celebrated its 25th anniversary. The train was extended to its "Big Game Train" length, which included a "Sightseer" lounge, tickets were discounted, and giveaways were held. Additionally, the southbound lead locomotive on the train (P42DC #168) was given a special "Heartland Flyer's 25th anniversary" decal.

=== Discontinuance threats ===
In April 2025, the Texas legislature stripped funding from the Heartland Flyer, putting the route at risk of being discontinued. In June 2025, the budget went through without funding for the train, and Oklahoma Governor Kevin Stitt announced that Oklahoma would not pick up that part of the cost. Shortly afterwards, Amtrak announced that if funding was not restored, the train's last run would be no later than October 1, 2025 with a specific date to be determined at a later time. On July 10, 2025, the North Central Texas Council of Governments awarded $3.5 million from its regional toll revenue allocations to keep the train running into 2026.

The Oklahoma legislature removed funding from the Heartland Flyer in 2026, and that May, TxDOT indicated that it would stop funding the train at the end of August 2026. The ODOT indicated that enough funds were available to run the train through the end of 2026, but it would be discontinued then if no new funding was found. In August 2026, the North Central Texas Council of Governments indicated that funding had been found to continue operations until at least late 2027 with TxDOT later confirming that they had reallocated some of its funding to continue the train's operation. In September, ODOT Director Tim Gatz confirmed ODOT had funding to continue the train through 2027, but not necessarily beyond.

== Proposed expansion ==
=== Extension to Kansas ===
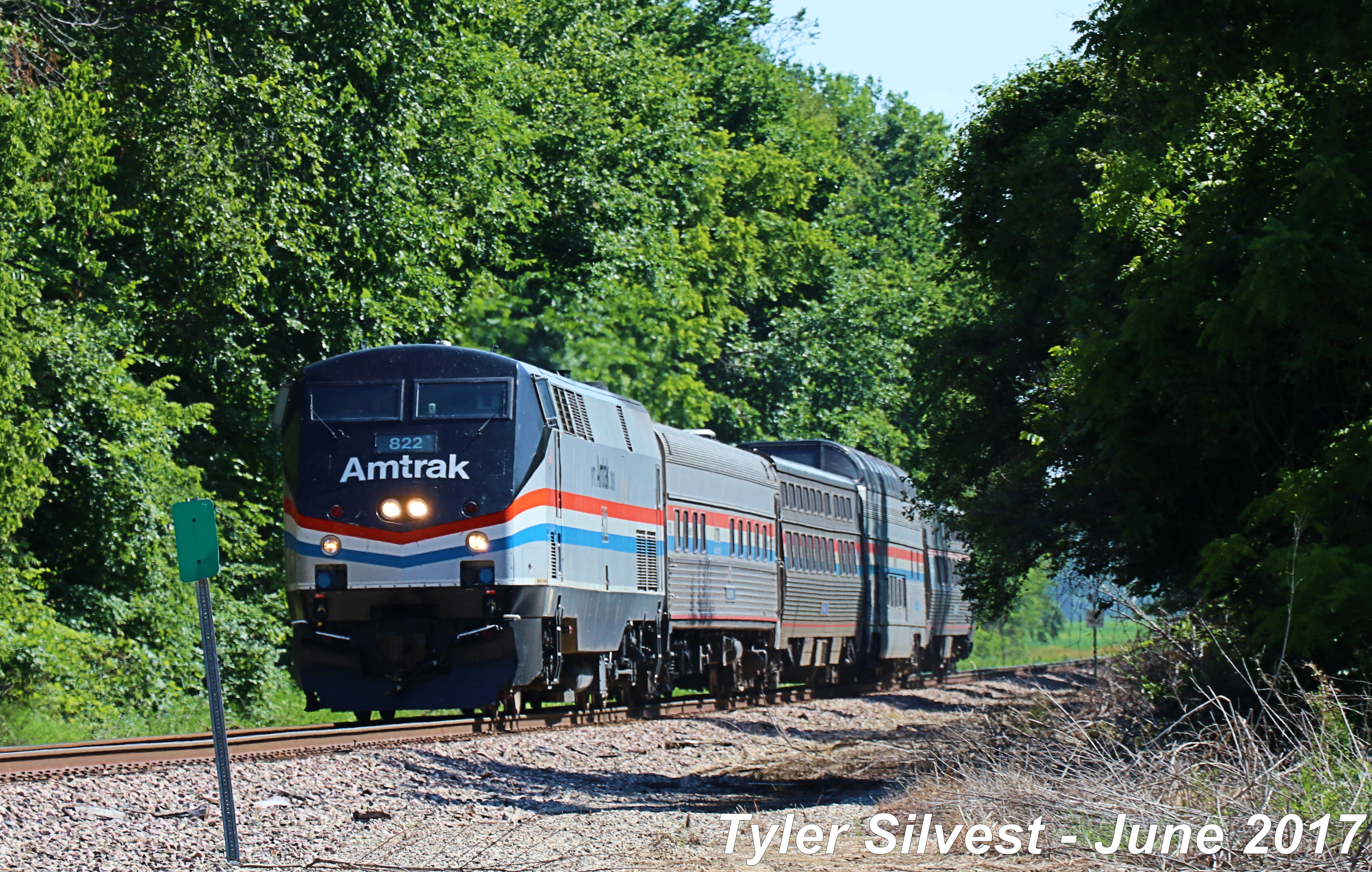
Amtrak #822 Leads the Heartland Flyer Inspection Train on the BNSF Topeka Sub in Shawnee, Kansas on June 9, 2017.

Since its inception, numerous proposals have been made to extend the Heartland Flyer northward from Oklahoma City to Kansas along the original route of the Lone Star. The extended line would serve Wichita Union Station before connecting with the Southwest Chief in Newton, Kansas. Some proposals would further extend the Heartland Flyer from Newton to Kansas City along the route of the Southwest Chief.

A 2009 study conducted by Amtrak proposed four options for the extension:

1. Extend the current round trip to Newton as a night train
2. Extend the current round trip to Kansas City as a night train
3. Add a new day train from Fort Worth to Kansas City
4. Add a new day train from Oklahoma City to Kansas City

Through coach service with the Southwest Chief was also stated as a possibility. By September 2010, only the first and third options were said to remain under consideration. In late 2011, the Kansas Department of Transportation (KDOT) released the results of a study into these options. A night train to Newton had an estimated start-up cost of $87.5 million and an annual subsidy of $4.4 million, while a day train to Kansas City had an estimated start-up cost of $245.5 million and an annual subsidy of $10 million. On June 9, 2017, Amtrak ran an inspection train between Oklahoma City and Kansas City in order to explore the Heartland Flyer extension to Newton.

In June 2021, Amtrak included the extension to Newton in its 15-year expansion vision. The plan also includes two additional round trips between Oklahoma City and Fort Worth. In November 2021, President Biden signed the Infrastructure Investment and Jobs Act, which could fund the plan. The extension was endorsed by the Oklahoma City Council in April 2022, and by Dodge City in October 2022. The governors of Oklahoma and Kansas supported the use of state funding for the plan.

In June 2023, Oklahoma and Kansas state officials began seeking federal approval and funding to extend the Heartland Flyer from Oklahoma City to Newton. In November 2023, KDOT said the service would start in 2029 if approved, but could begin sooner were the project to be fast tracked.

In December 2023, the Federal Railroad Administration accepted an application by KDOT to enter the Oklahoma City–Wichita–Newton extension into its Corridor Identification and Development Program. The program grants $500,000 toward service planning and prioritizes the extension for future federal funding. It could include stops in Edmond, Guthrie, Perry, and Ponca City.

In anticipation of the return of Amtrak services to the city via the Heartland Flyer, Ponca City undertook to rehabilitate the station with renovations beginning in February 2025. The estimated cost of the project is $3.2 million. A ribbon-cutting marking the completion of the project was held on August 6, 2026.

=== Other proposals ===
During the 1990s, a reroute of the Texas Eagle was considered that would have removed Austin and San Antonio in favor of the former Texas & Pacific route via Abilene and Midland/Odessa to Sierra Blanca. To compensate for the loss, the Heartland Flyer would have been extended south to San Antonio, connecting with the Sunset Limited. This reroute was ultimately rejected.

In the 2014-2019 timeframe, service from Tulsa to connect with the Heartland Flyer at Oklahoma City was explored through the Eastern Flyer proposal, but that project fell through.

In 2020, Amtrak reported it was working to add a new stop in Thackerville, Oklahoma with access to the WinStar World Casino operated by the Chickasaw Nation.

== Stations ==
Amtrak Heartland Flyer stations
State/Province	City	Station
Oklahoma	Oklahoma City	Santa Fe Transit Hub
Oklahoma	Norman	Norman
Oklahoma	Purcell	Purcell
Oklahoma	Pauls Valley	Pauls Valley
Oklahoma	Ardmore	Ardmore
Texas	Gainesville	Gainesville
Texas	Fort Worth	Fort Worth Central
