= Santa Fe Depot (Oklahoma City) =

Railway station in Oklahoma City, Oklahoma

Santa Fe Depot Oklahoma City, OK
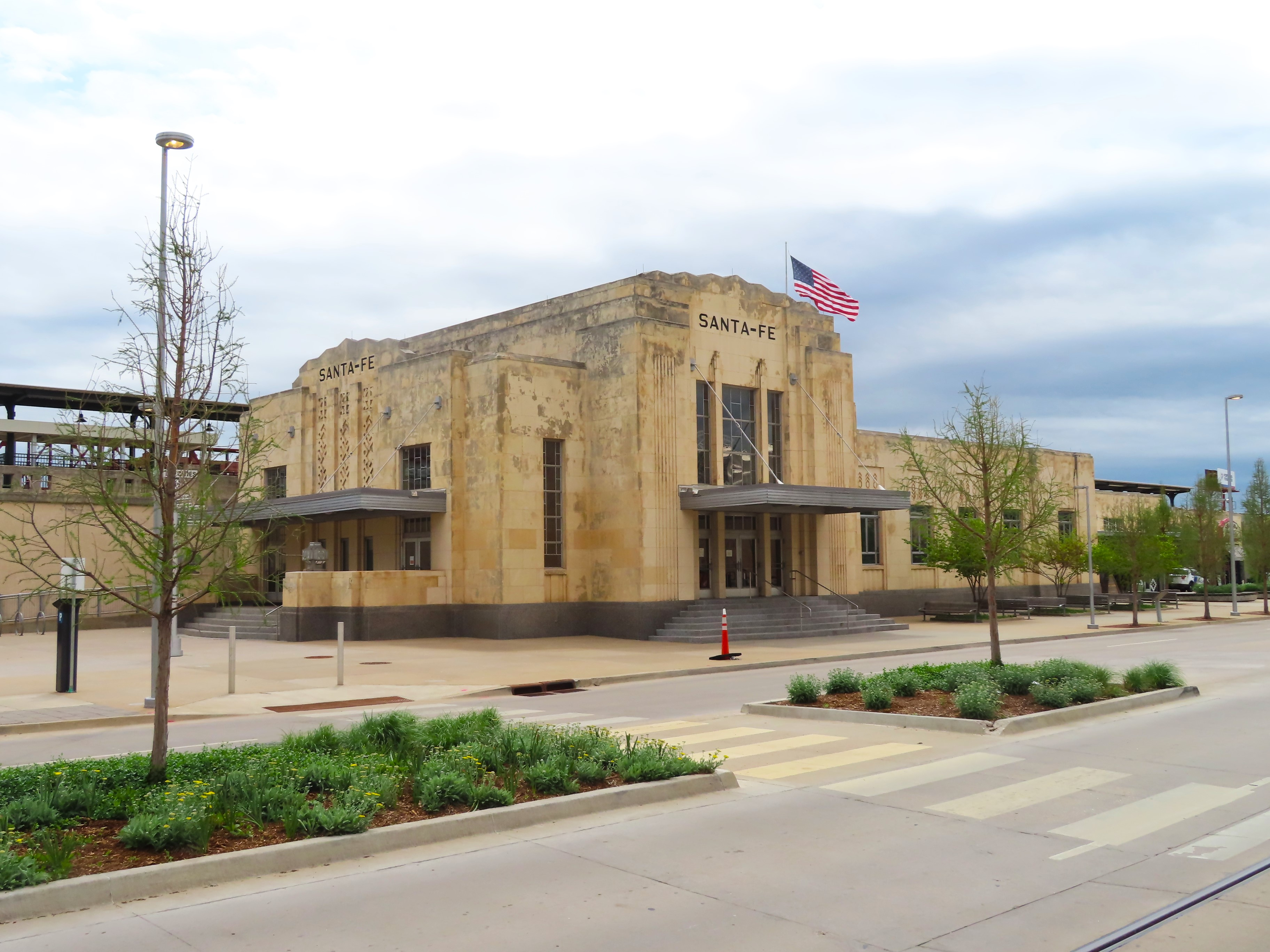
- Santa Fe Depot in 2022

General information
- Location: 100 South E.K. Gaylord Boulevard; Oklahoma City, Oklahoma; United States
- Coordinates: 35.4653°N 97.5128°W
- Owner: City of Oklahoma City
- Platforms: 1 side platform
- Tracks: 1
- Connections: Oklahoma City Streetcar

Construction
- Parking: Yes
- Cycle facilities: Yes
- Accessible: Yes

Other information
- Station code: Amtrak: OKC

History
- Opened: 1999
- Closed: 1979
- Rebuilt: 1934

Passengers
- FY 2025: 57,159 (Amtrak)

Services
Preceding station	Amtrak	Following station
Norman toward Fort Worth	Heartland Flyer	Terminus
Preceding station	EMBARK	Following station
Ballpark One-way operation	Downtown Loop transfer at Santa Fe Hub	Arena Next clockwise
Ballpark One-way operation	Bricktown Loop transfer at Santa Fe Hub	Arena Next clockwise
Former services
Preceding station	Amtrak	Following station
Norman toward Dallas or Houston	Lone Star	Guthrie toward Chicago
Preceding station	Atchison, Topeka and Santa Fe Railway	Following station
Flynn toward Newton	Newton – Purcell	Britton toward Purcell
Location

Santa Fe Depot (Amtrak: OKC), also known as the Santa Fe Transit Hub, is an Amtrak station located in downtown Oklahoma City, Oklahoma. It is the northern terminus of the Heartland Flyer, a daily train to Fort Worth, Texas.

The Art Deco structure was built in 1934 by the Atchison, Topeka and Santa Fe Railway, colloquially known as the Santa Fe. It is the third station to have been built on the site. The building was added to the National Register of Historic Places in 2015.

== History ==
=== Previous stations ===
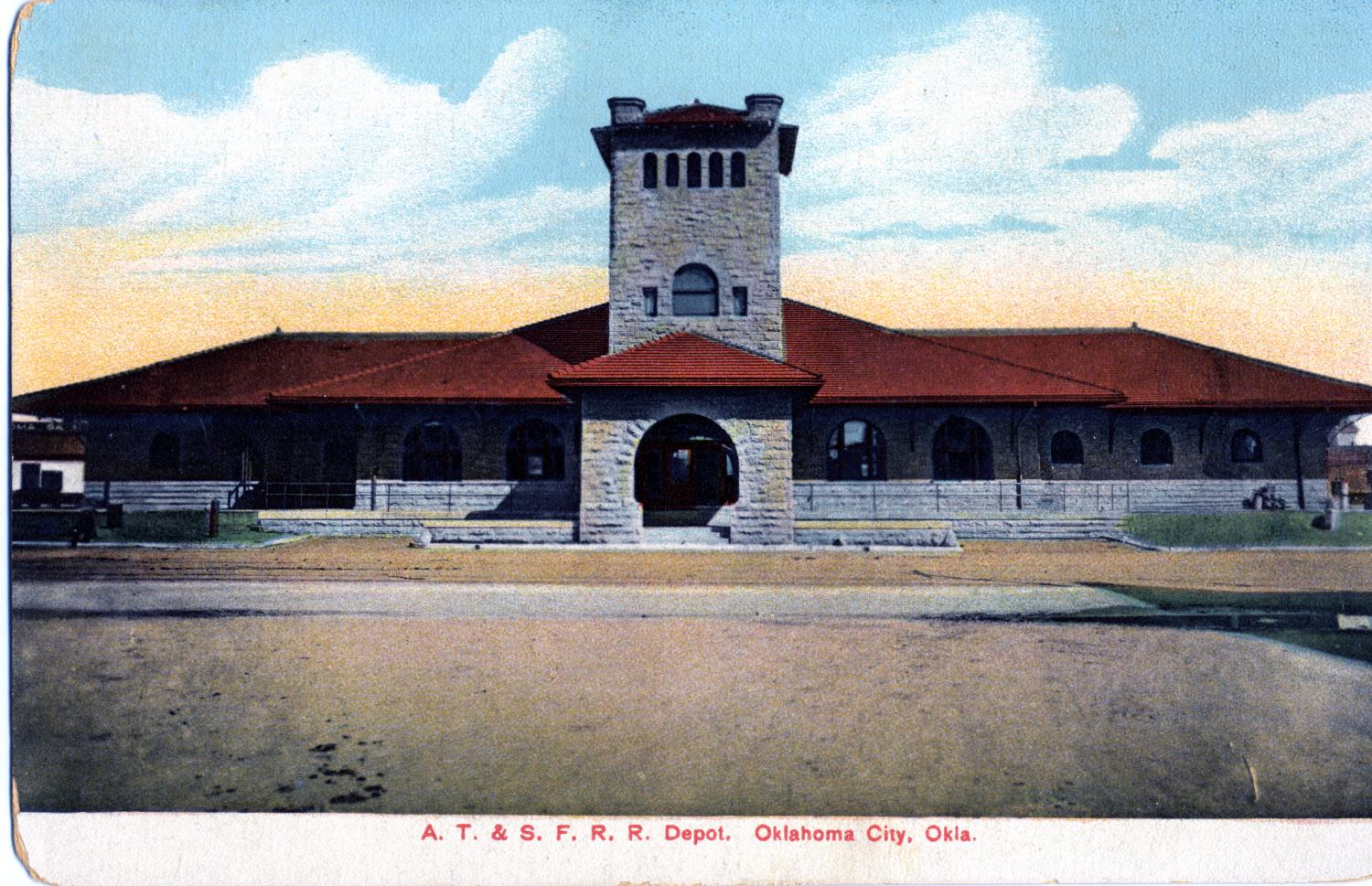
The second Santa Fe Depot in Oklahoma City, built 1901.

In 1887, the Santa Fe constructed the Southern Kansas Railway, which traveled south from Arkansas City, Kansas to modern-day Purcell, Oklahoma to connect to the Texas-based Gulf, Colorado and Santa Fe Railway. Among the stops on the railway was Oklahoma Station, a water stop. A townsite developed around Oklahoma Station, which evolved into a full settlement during the Land Rush of 1889.

During the land rush, the railroad was assigned a two-block plot of land for use as station grounds. The first station was built in 1889. It was demolished in 1901 to make room for a larger station.

Following a decades-long conflict between local railroads and the city council, the railroads opted to elevate their tracks to reduce the number of at-grade crossings in the city. This necessitated the creation of a new station, as the previous station was built at street level. The second station was closed in 1932 and was demolished a year later. Sculpted limestone bricks from the station were later re-used in the construction of a local church, which itself was demolished in 1988.

=== Current station ===
The current station was opened in 1934. The structure was built as a combination depot, containing both freight and passenger operations; the southern side of the depot housed the freight operations, while the northern side housed the passenger waiting room.

While Oklahoma City was serviced by four rail lines, the station (like its predecessors) was used only by the Santa Fe. The Frisco and Rock Island railways were based out of Union Station, while the Missouri–Kansas–Texas Railroad had its own station on East Reno Street.

Two Santa Fe passenger lines stopped at the station: the Texas Chief and the Chicagoan and Kansas Cityan. The Chicagoan and Kansas Cityan was retired in 1968, while the Texas Chief was transferred to Amtrak and later renamed the Lone Star.

In 1979, Amtrak terminated the Lone Star, ending passenger service to the station. While the track continued to be used by the Santa Fe (and its successor, BNSF Railway) for freight, the station was left vacant for 20 years and began to deteriorate.

=== Heartland Flyer ===
In 1998, Jim Brewer, a developer responsible for creating the nearby Bricktown entertainment district, purchased the station from Santa Fe Railway and oversaw a renovation using $2 million funds provided through the Oklahoma Department of Transportation (ODOT) to make it accessible to people with disabilities and usable as a train station. In 1998, Amtrak and the state reached an informal agreement with Brewer Entertainment to use the station rent-free as the northern terminus of the new Heartland Flyer line, connecting to Fort Worth. The agreement required the state to pay for utilities and other costs associated with station operations.

Service on the Heartland Flyer began in 1999. Another $3.1 million renovation was completed in 2007, and additional accessibility features were added with a $30,000 project funded by the American Recovery and Reinvestment Act of 2009.

No official lease had been drawn up until at least 2010, when Brent Brewer locked the doors of the depot on September 27 and 29, forcing new negotiations with ODOT. On December 21, 2010, it was announced that the ODOT had signed a lease of the station and parking lot for 25 months, with the option to extend the lease for up to ten years.

The station was listed on the National Register of Historic Places in 2015. A renovation of the station was completed in 2017.

On December 14, 2018, the Oklahoma City Streetcar commenced operations. The Streetcar has a stop named after the station on Reno Avenue, though it is on the opposite side of the railroad tracks.
