= Galveston Railroad Museum =

- Santa Fe Union Station
- U.S. National Historic Landmark District – Contributing property
- U.S. Historic district – Contributing property
- Recorded Texas Historic Landmark
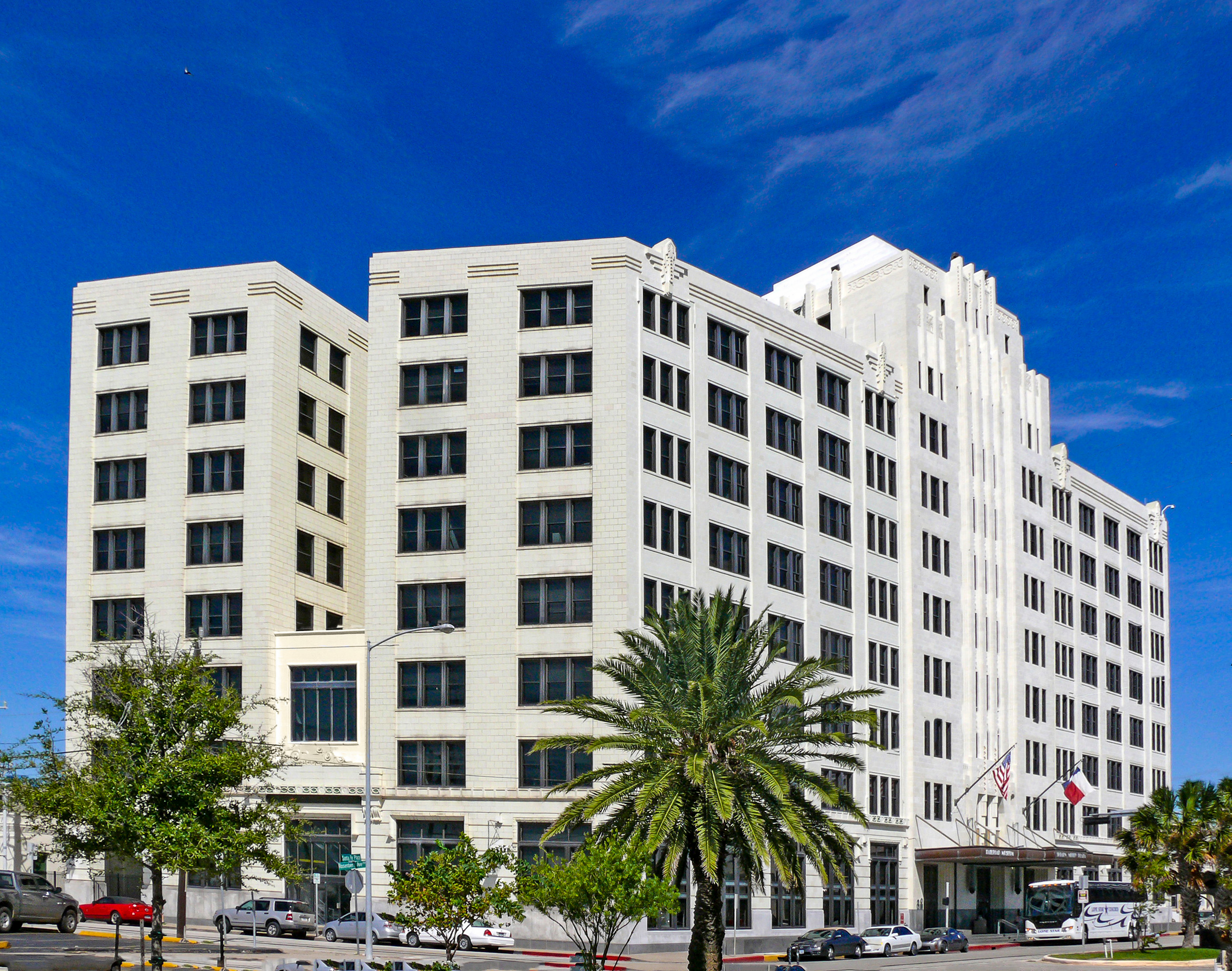
- Santa Fe Union Station

- Location within Texas Location within the United States
- Location: 123 Rosenberg Ave., Galveston, Texas
- Coordinates: 29°18′23″N 94°47′52″W
- Built: 1932
- Website: Galveston Railroad Museum
- Part of: The Strand Historic District (ID70000748)
- RTHL No.: 7178

Significant dates
- Designated NHLDCP: May 11, 1976
- Designated CP: January 26, 1970
- Designated RTHL: 1983

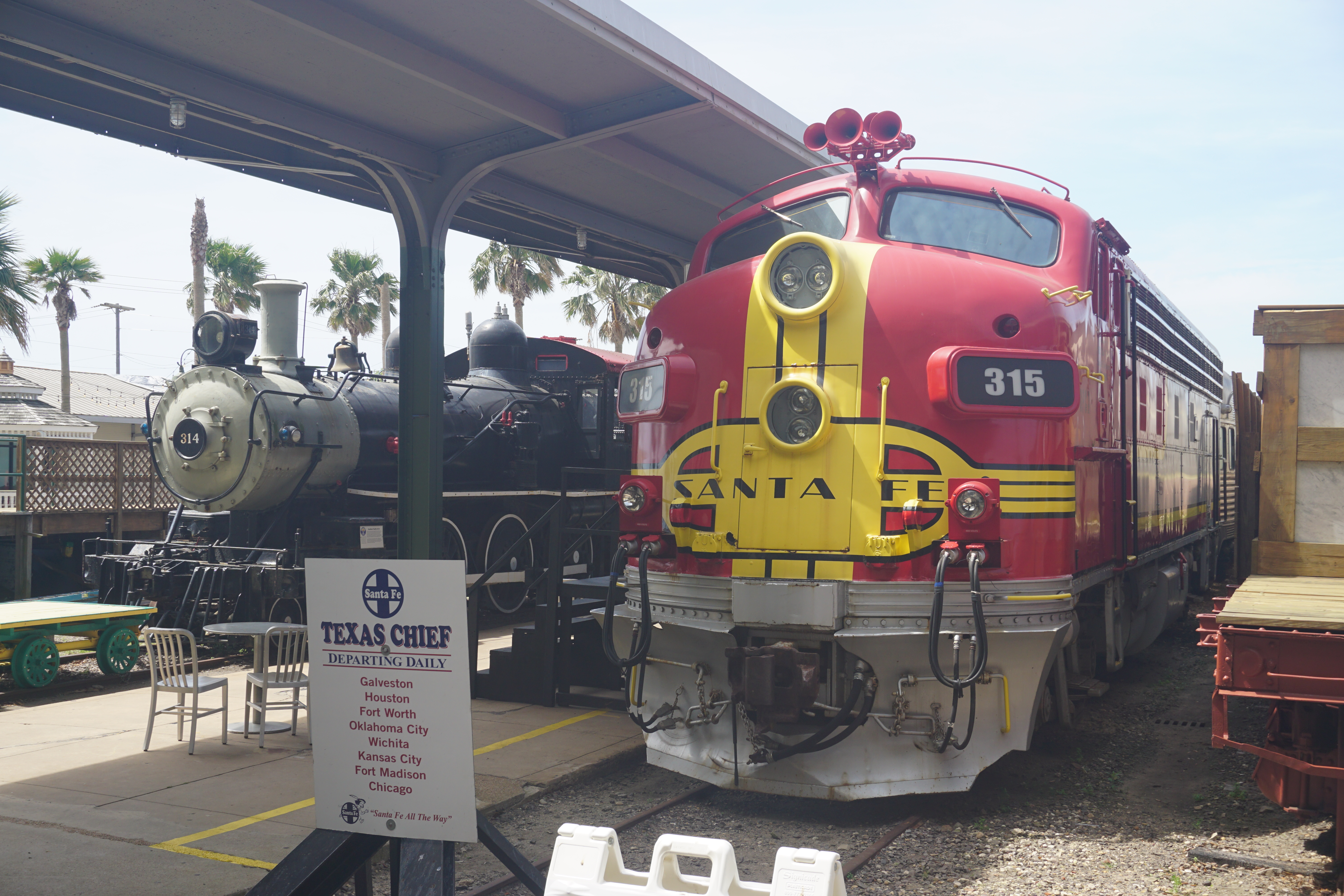
Atchison, Topeka and Santa Fe EMD F7A No. 315 and Southern Pacific 1892 Cooke 4-6-0 No. 314 at the Galveston Railroad Museum

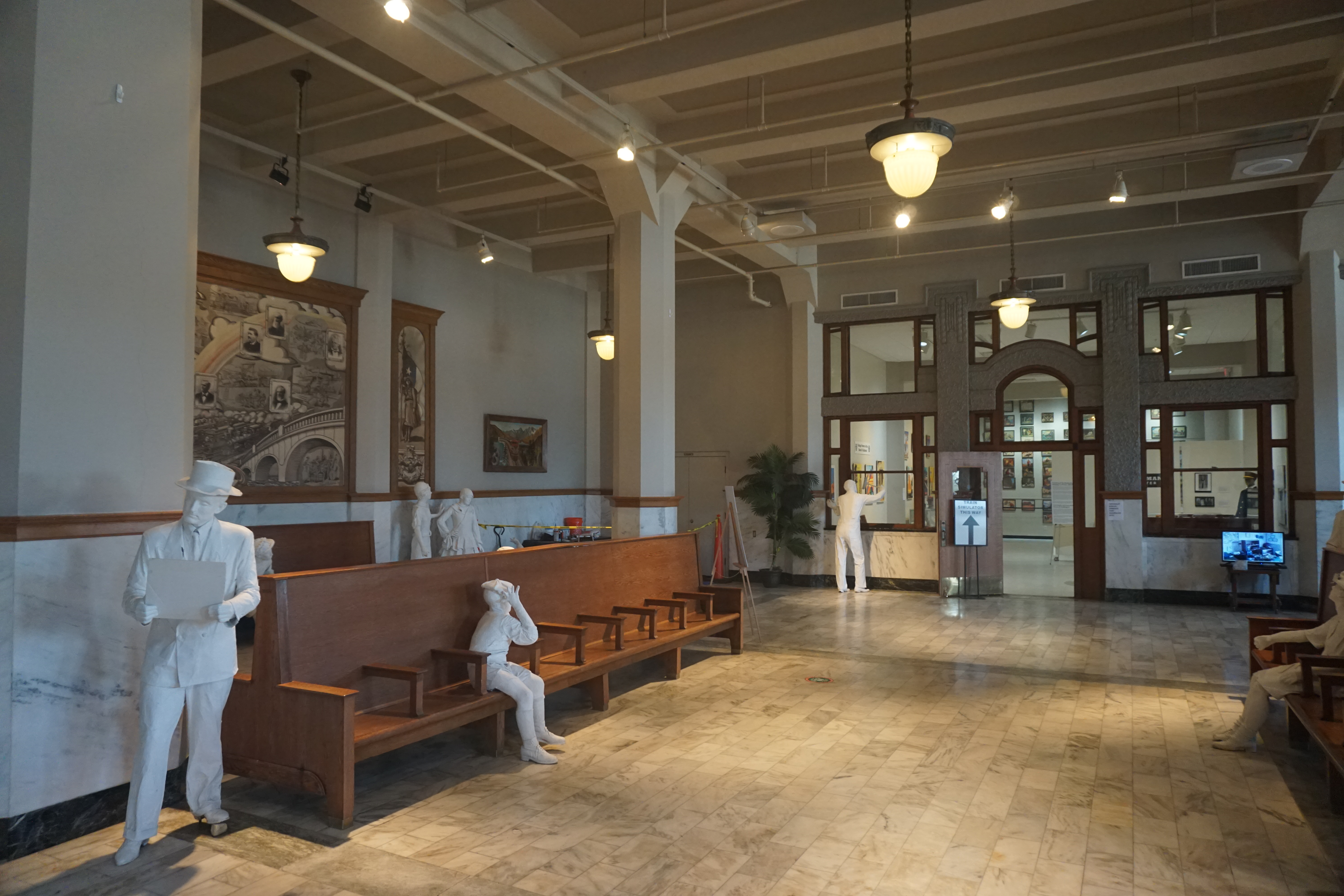
Interior of the Galveston Railroad Museum

The Galveston Railroad Museum is a railroad museum housed in the former Santa Fe Railroad station, at 25th and Strand in Galveston, Texas. The Museum is owned and operated by the Center for Transportation and Commerce, a non-profit organization.

The museum was established with funds from Galveston businesswoman and philanthropist Mary Moody Northen and the Moody Foundation.

== Equipment ==
=== Diesel Locomotives ===
- Atchison, Topeka, & Santa Fe F7A #315 (Originally Southern Pacific #6443)
- Atchison, Topeka, & Santa Fe F7A #316 (Originally Texas & New Orleans #365)
- BNSF Railway EMD GP38AC #2127 (Originally St Louis San Francisco #650)
- Galveston Railroad Museum GE 80-Tonner #1983
- Union Pacific H-20-44 #410 (Originally Akron, Canton, & Youngstown #505) [Scrapped 2025]

=== Steam Locomotives ===
- Magma Arizona 2-8-0 #555
- Southern Pacific 4-6-0 #314
- Waco, Beaumont, Trinity, & Sabine 2-6-2 #1

=== Passenger Cars ===
- Center for Transportation & Commerce baggage car #1001 (Originally MILW)
- Center for Transportation & Commerce baggage car #1002 (Originally MILW)
- Center for Transportation & Commerce baggage car #1103 (Originally MILW)
- Center for Transportation & Commerce baggage car #1204 (Originally MILW)
- Chicago & North Western observation #401 "Anacapa"
- Illinois Central Railway Post Office (RPO) #100
- Louisville & Nashville baggage car #1205
- MRLX baggage car #1258 "Arthur R. Camody Jr Rail Library"
- MRLX cafe #145 "Northern Lights" (ex-Amtrak)
- MRLX coach #54520 "John E. Bertini Jr, M.D." (ex-Amtrak)
- New York Central observation #800038 "Bonnie Brook"
- PPCX observation #800279 "Silver Foot"
- Pullman observation "Mt. Darwin"
- Pullman sleeper "Glen Fee"
- RPCX coach #800861 "Alonzo H. Harter"
- RPCX coach #800882 "George H. Gould"
- RPCX coach #800911 "City of Galveston"
- RPCX sleeper #1117 "Donald E. Harper Jr"
- Southern Railway diner #3305
- Southern Railway observation "Robert E Lee" (Originally CB&Q)

=== Freight Cars ===
- Atchison, Topeka, & Santa Fe tank car #100221
- Atchison, Topeka, & Santa Fe 50' box car
- Denver & Rio Grande Western box car #62746
- Southern Pacific box car #34828

=== Cabooses ===
- Atchison, Topeka, & Santa Fe #1642
- Chicago, Burlington, & Quincy #14118
- Fort Worth & Denver #107
- Missouri Pacific #13895

== See also ==
- List of National Historic Landmarks in Texas
- National Register of Historic Places listings in Galveston County, Texas
- Recorded Texas Historic Landmarks in Galveston County
- Galveston Island Trolley

| Preceding station | Atchison, Topeka and Santa Fe Railway | Following station |
Former services
| Texas City Junction toward Purcell | Gulf, Colorado and Santa Fe Railway Main Line | Terminus |
| Texas City Junction toward Houston | Houston – Galveston | Terminus |
| Terminus | Galveston – Longview | 9th Street Landing toward Longview |
