= Purcell station =

Railway station in Purcell, Oklahoma

Purcell, OK
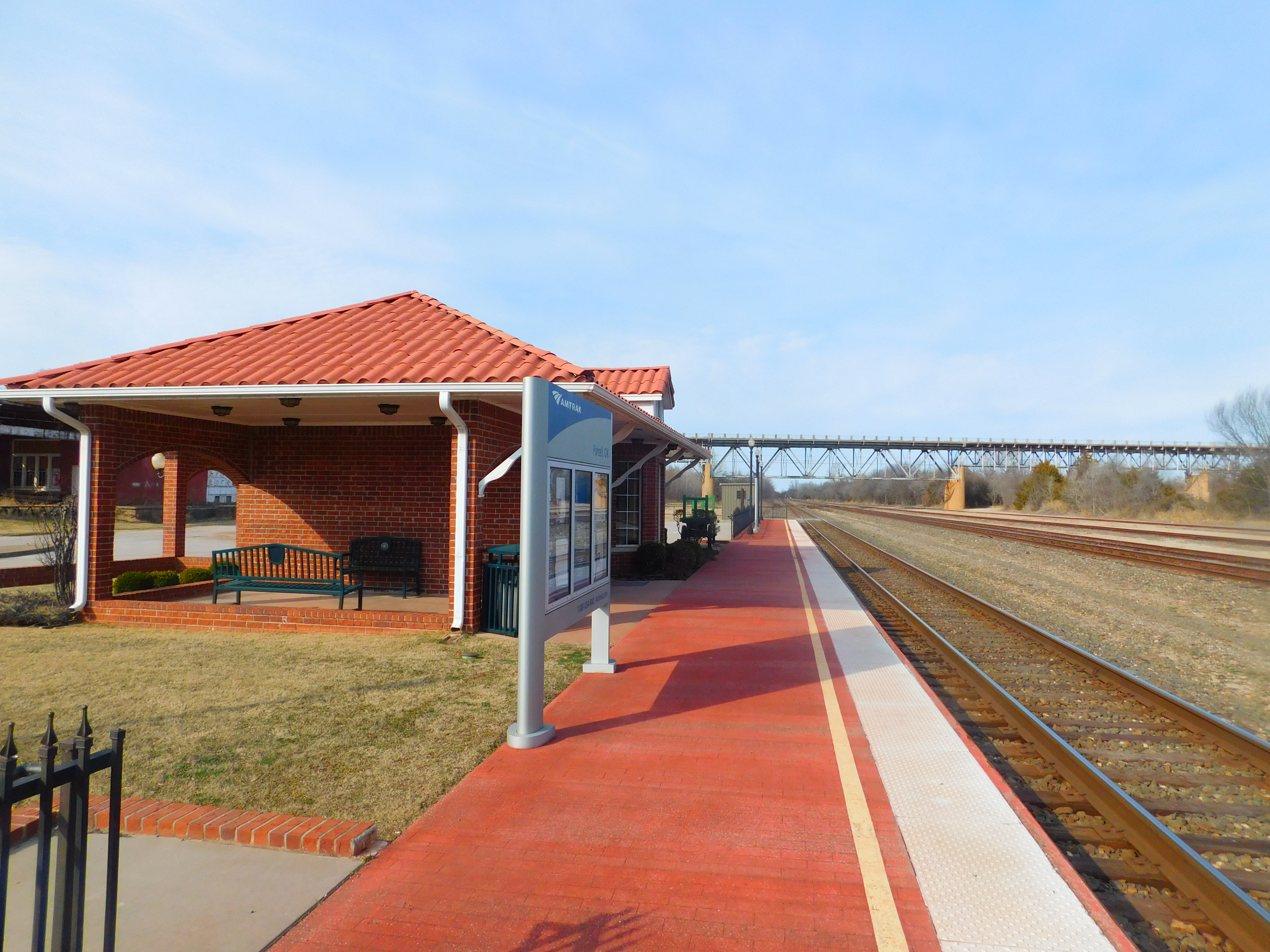
- The station at Purcell in February 2017. The James C. Nance Memorial Bridge (U.S. Route 77 / State Highway 39) over the Canadian River is in the distance.

General information
- Location: East Main Street and North Santa Fe Avenue; Purcell, Oklahoma; United States
- Coordinates: 35.0120°N 97.3573°W
- Platforms: 1 side platform
- Tracks: 1

Construction
- Accessible: yes

Other information
- Station code: Amtrak: PUR

History
- Opened: June 15, 1999 (Heartland Flyer)
- Closed: October 8, 1979 (Lone Star)
- Rebuilt: June 14, 2001

Passengers
- FY 2025: 2,015 (Amtrak)

Services
Preceding station	Amtrak	Following station
Pauls Valley toward Fort Worth	Heartland Flyer	Norman toward Oklahoma City
Former services
Preceding station	Amtrak	Following station
Pauls Valley toward Dallas or Houston	Lone Star	Norman toward Chicago
Preceding station	Atchison, Topeka and Santa Fe Railway	Following station
Noble toward Newton	Newton – Purcell	Terminus
Terminus	Gulf, Colorado and Santa Fe Railway Main Line	Wayne toward Galveston
Kirfort toward Chickasha	Chickasha – Purcell	Terminus
Location

Purcell (Amtrak: PUR) is an Amtrak station in Purcell, Oklahoma. The station is serviced by Amtrak's daily Heartland Flyer, which travels from Oklahoma City, Oklahoma to Fort Worth, Texas.

== History ==
Rail service to the area was established by the Atchison, Topeka and Santa Fe Railway (now BNSF Railway) in 1887, which aimed to create a junction between the Santa Fe and its Texas-based Gulf, Colorado and Santa Fe division. A townsite for railway employees was constructed around the junction and named after the Santa Fe's director, Edward B. Purcell.

A station house was built at the junction in 1904. At some point, that station was demolished and rebuilt. The rebuilt station was in service until 1979, when the Lone Star was discontinued, and it was demolished in the 1990s.

In 1999, the Heartland Flyer was established, which restored rail service to the city. The city constructed a brick station house for use as a waiting area, which opened on June 14, 2001. The interior contains Santa Fe memorabilia, including a bench from a former depot in Shawnee, Oklahoma.
