= Lone Star (Amtrak train) =

Former named American passenger train

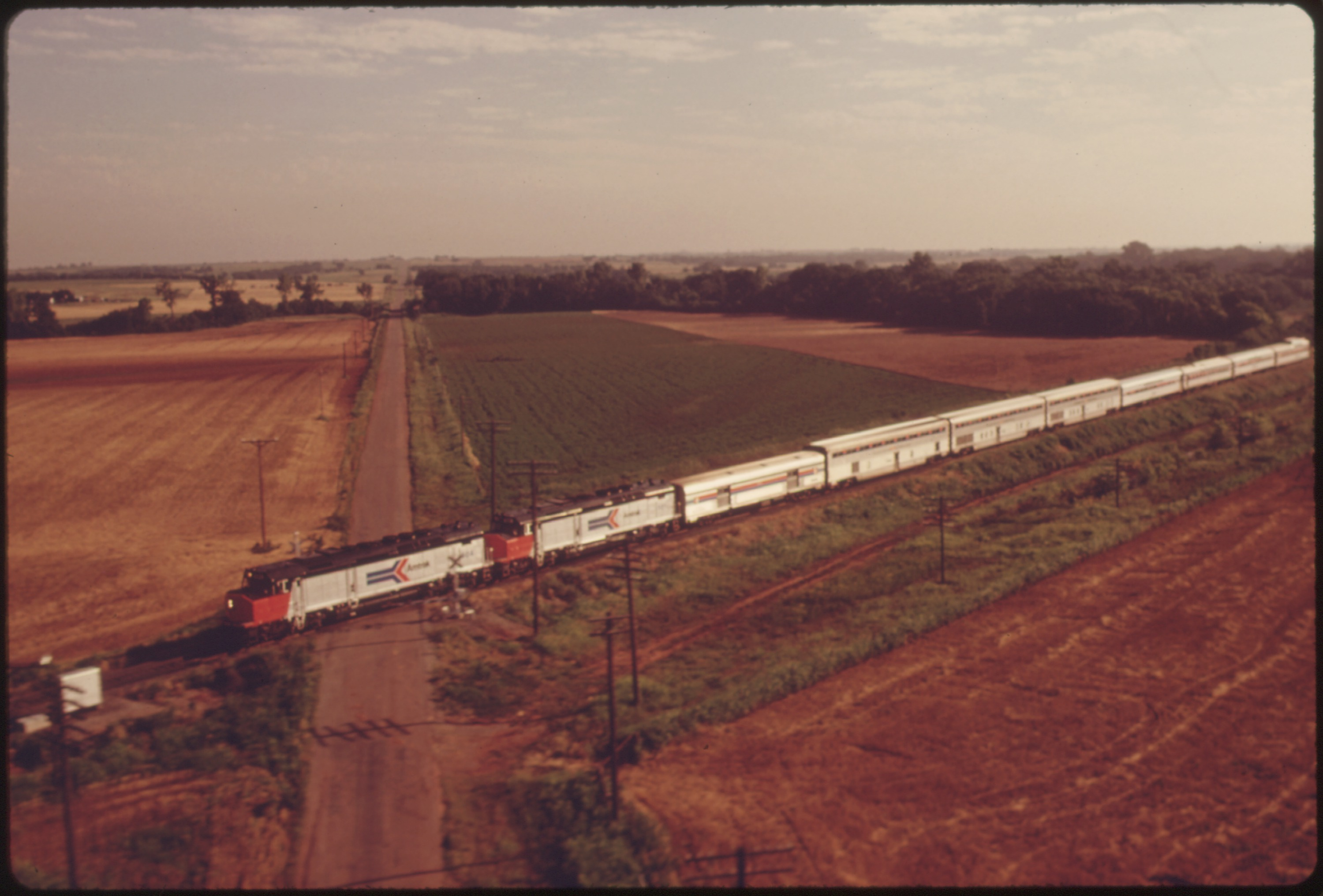
- A southbound Lone Star southwest of Guthrie, Oklahoma, in 1974.

Overview
- Service type: Inter-city rail
- Predecessor: Texas Chief
- First service: May 19, 1974
- Last service: October 8, 1979
- Successor: Inter-American
- Former operator: Amtrak

Route
- Termini: Chicago, Illinois; Houston, Texas; Dallas, Texas
- Distance travelled: 1,368 mi (2,201.58 km)
- Service frequency: Daily
- Train number: 15,16

Technical
- Track gauge: 1,435 mm (4 ft 8 1/2 in)
- Track owner: ATSF Railway

The Lone Star was an Amtrak passenger train that ran between Chicago and Houston, or Dallas via Kansas City, Wichita, Oklahoma City, and Fort Worth. The train was renamed from the Texas Chief, which the Atchison, Topeka and Santa Fe Railway had introduced in 1948. Amtrak discontinued the Lone Star in 1979.

== History ==
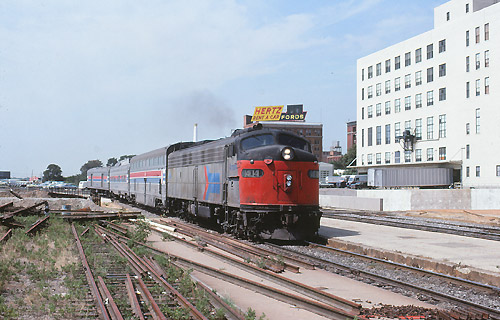
The Dallas section in July 1977

The Santa Fe introduced the Texas Chief on April 3, 1948, between Chicago and Galveston, Texas via Kansas City, Wichita, Oklahoma City, Fort Worth, and Houston. It was truncated to Houston in early 1967.

From 1955 until 1968, a section would cut off at Gainesville, Texas to serve Denton, Texas and Dallas.

Santa Fe conveyed the Texas Chief to Amtrak at the latter's inception in 1971. Amtrak changed the train's name from Texas Chief to Lone Star on May 19, 1974, after the Santa Fe determined that Amtrak's trains no longer met its service standards and demanded that Amtrak stop using the "Chief" name.

The train was popular with students of the many colleges and universities along its route, such as the University of Kansas, University of Missouri-Kansas City, Wichita State University and the University of Oklahoma. It provided economical transportation to and from school. In the fiscal year 1976, the train carried 274,448 passengers.

Amtrak planned to use the Southern Pacific Railroad tracks to service Dallas which would increase ridership and revenue. After announcing in early 1973 that the switch would occur June 10, Dallas acquired Union Station for $6 million. Unfortunately, the Southern Pacific Railroad demanded $7.7 million to fix up the line for “minimum standards” for passenger trains. It then told that National Arbitration Panel, a standard procedure for resolving disagreements between Amtrak and its member railroads, that it needed $14.5 million to reduce Amtrak's interference with its freight operations. Amtrak argued only $5.4 million was needed to make the trip from Dallas to Houston in seven hours and ten minutes. The Arbitrators hired a law firm which reported that $11 million in repairs was needed and the trip could be made in five hours and 45 minutes. The report stated travel time could further be reduced to five hours and 25 minutes or four hours and 55 minutes if the Southern Pacific 70 mph speed limit was raised to the ICC 79 mph standard.

However, in March 1975, Amtrak withdrew from the arbitration process and abandoned plans to connect Dallas with Houston, citing better places to spend $5 million and instead adding a section from Fort Worth to Dallas only on July 1, 1975. The Dallas through cars were temporarily discontinued between October 1976 and February 15, 1977, during which time the Lone Star was combined with the Chicago–Los Angeles Southwest Limited (itself the successor of another Santa Fe mainstay, the Super Chief) between Chicago and Kansas City.

Due to cuts by Congress as part of the Amtrak Reorganization Act of 1979 – pressed by the US Department of Transportation under the Carter administration — the Lone Star was discontinued on October 8, 1979, leaving Oklahoma without passenger train service until 1999. Chicago–Houston service was retained by adding a Houston section to the Chicago–Laredo Inter-American, which split at Temple. At the time of its discontinuance, the Lone Star was Amtrak's seventh most popular long-distance train. The Houston section remained until 1981, when the Inter-American itself was cut back to San Antonio and renamed the Eagle.

== Current service along former route ==
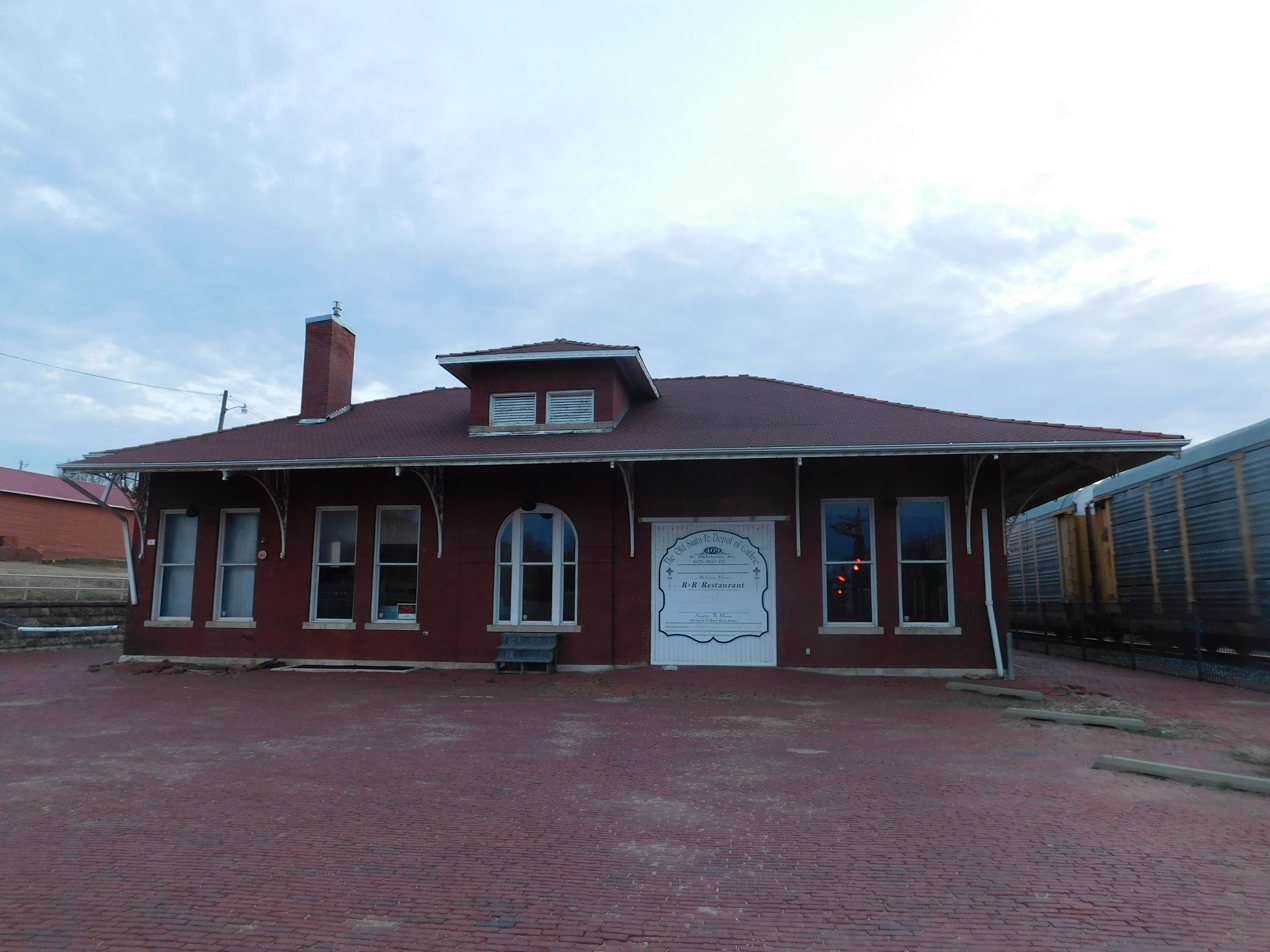
Guthrie station in February 2017

Of the original Texas Chief/Lone Star route, only the Newton, Kansas–Wichita–Oklahoma City and Temple–Houston–Galveston segments remain without passenger train service. Chicago–Newton is served by Amtrak's Southwest Chief (itself the successor of another Santa Fe mainstay, the Super Chief), while Oklahoma City–Fort Worth is served by Amtrak's Heartland Flyer. While the Newton–Wichita–Oklahoma City portion does not have passenger train service, it has been served by Amtrak Thruway since April 2016 and a revival of Amtrak service is proposed. In June 2021, Amtrak released a plan that would add two more round trips between Oklahoma City and Fort Worth while extending the original round trip to Newton.

Chicago–Dallas service is provided by Amtrak's Texas Eagle via a different route than the Lone Star, which goes to San Antonio.

== Potential restoration ==
In June 2021, Senator Jon Tester (D-Montana) added an amendment to the Surface Transportation Investment Act of 2021 which requires the Department of Transportation (not Amtrak itself) to evaluate the restoration of discontinued long-distance routes, such as the Lone Star. The bill passed the Senate Commerce Committee with bipartisan support, and was later rolled into President Biden's Infrastructure Investment and Jobs Act, which was passed into law in November 2021. The report must be delivered to Congress within two years. The law also provides $2.4 billion in new funds to Amtrak's long-distance route network.

On October 28, 2022, the Amtrak Daily Long-Distance Service Study was announced by the Federal Railroad Administration. Its purpose is to evaluate the restoration and addition of discontinued and new long-distance passenger services, as well as the upgrading of tri-weekly long-distance services (the Sunset Limited and the Cardinal) to daily operation. The criteria for either restoring or creating new long-distance routes are that they connect large and small communities as part of a "regional rail network", provide economic and social well-being for rural areas, provide "enhanced connectivity" for the existing long-distance passenger trains, and reflect the support and engagement of the locals and region for restored long-distance passenger service. These criteria include the Lone Star, among other trains. The study will take place through 2023, and will engage with stakeholders, the rail companies, and communities as it "evaluates how to better connect people with long-distance rail services".

In June 2023, Oklahoma and Kansas state officials began seeking federal approval and funding to extend the Heartland Flyer from Oklahoma City to Newton. In November 2023, KDOT said the service would start in 2029 if approved, but could begin sooner were the project to be fast tracked.

== Equipment ==
During 1976–1977 when the Lone Star combined with the Southwest Chief between Chicago and Kansas City, the Lone Star consisted of two baggage cars, two Hi-Level coaches, a dormitory bar-lounge, an ex-Santa Fe dining car, two 10-roomette/6-bedroom Pine-series sleeping cars, and a 48-seat single-level coach. One baggage car, one sleeping car, and the single-level coach operated through to Dallas.
