= Gulf, Colorado and Santa Fe Railway =

American railroad

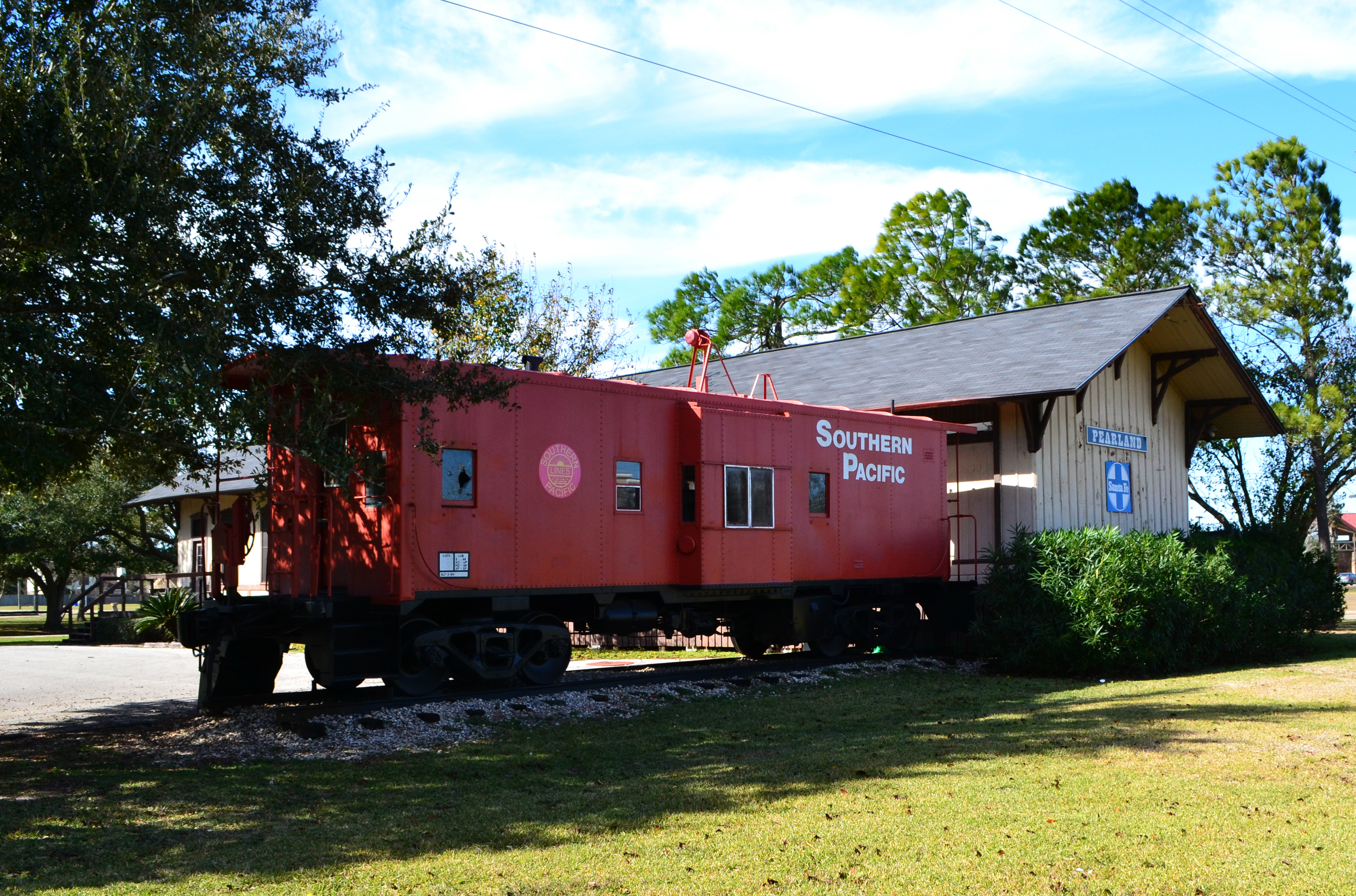
- GCSF train depot, Pearland, Texas

Overview
- Headquarters: Galveston, Texas
- Locale: Texas; Oklahoma
- Dates of operation: 1873–1965
- Successor: Atchison, Topeka & Santa Fe Railway

Technical
- Track gauge: 4 ft 8 1/2 in (1,435 mm) standard gauge,

The Gulf, Colorado and Santa Fe Railway (GC&SF) was an American railroad chartered in Texas in 1873 to build from Galveston to Santa Fe, New Mexico. By 1886, it had built from Galveston to a junction in Temple, Texas, which was founded by the company. From Temple, one line went north to Dallas and Fort Worth via a junction in Cleburne, while a second line extended northwest and terminated near Coleman, Texas.

That year, the GC&SF was purchased by the Atchison, Topeka and Santa Fe (ATSF), which would use the GC&SF for decades as an operating subsidiary pursuant to Article X of the Texas Constitution, which required railroads in Texas to be headquartered in the state. Under ATSF ownership, the GC&SF was extended northwards via Fort Worth to Purcell, Oklahoma, northeast via Dallas to Paris, Texas, southwest to San Angelo, and northwest to Sweetwater, where it connected to the Panhandle and Santa Fe Railway, the major ATSF operating subsidiary serving Lubbock and the Texas panhandle. Acquisitions and extensions of the GC&SF into East Texas would reach Beaumont, Longview, Port Bolivar, and Oakdale, Louisiana. Article X was subsequently nullified and in 1965 the GC&SF was absorbed by the ATSF. Today, extant segments of the GC&SF are part of the BNSF Railway system.

== History ==
=== 19th century ===
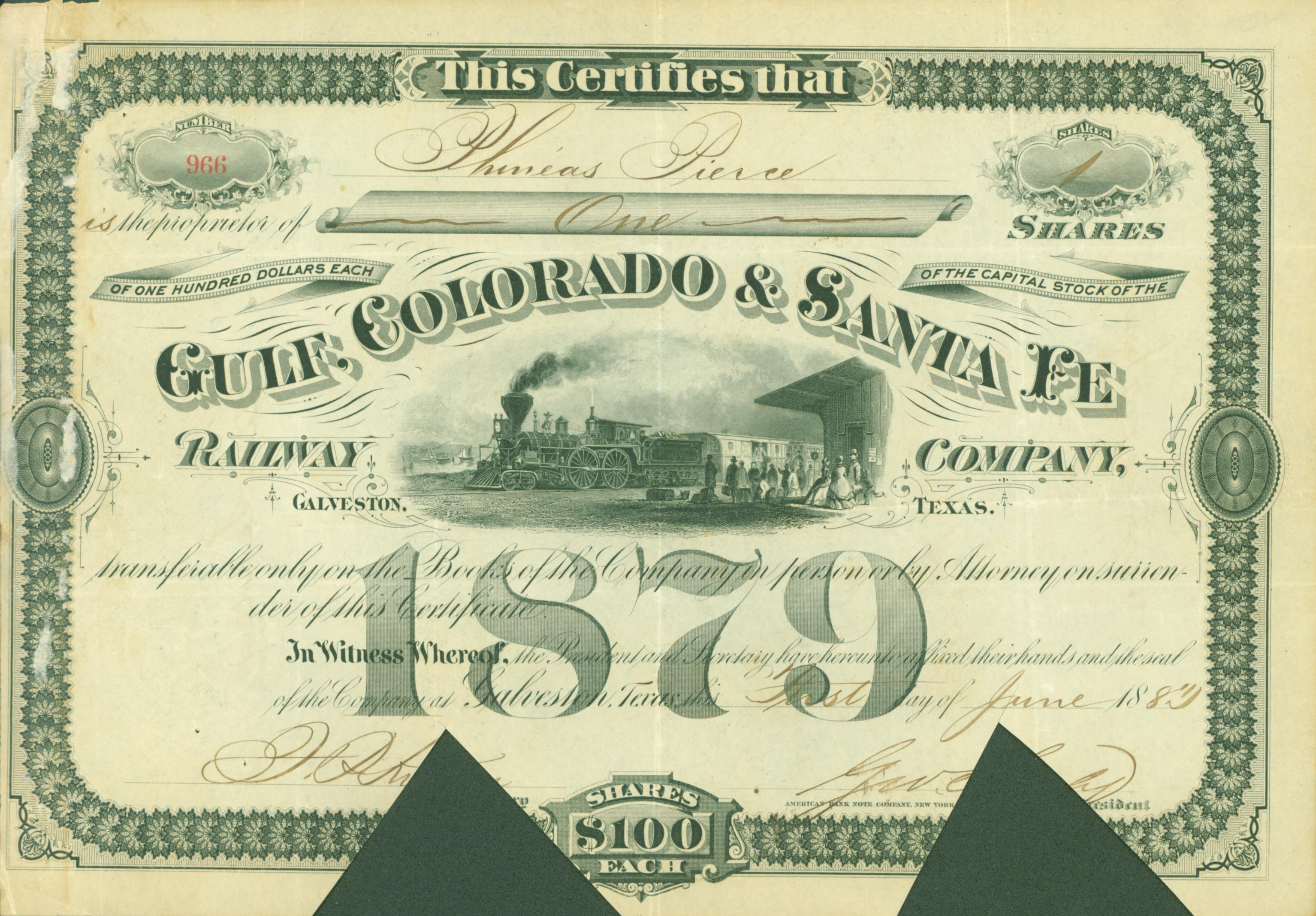
Share of the Gulf, Colorado and Santa Fe Railway Company, issued 1 June 1883

In 1873, competition between the cities of Houston and Galveston was strong, and the Galveston, Houston & Henderson Railroad (GH&H) was the only rail link between the two cities. The competition between Houston and Galveston was fed by the quarantines, which were often imposed on Galveston traffic by Houston. These quarantines occurred almost annually and were based on yellow fever outbreaks and epidemics. So, the citizens of Galveston decided to build their own railroad line that would reach across Texas, into the Panhandle, and across the state line to Santa Fe, New Mexico. The idea was to bypass Houston. The Gulf, Colorado & Santa Fe Railroad (GC&SF) was chartered, and the state agreed to grant 16 sections of land per mile of track laid.

While the charter passed in 1873, the actual construction of the line did not begin until two years later. The plans to initiate construction were formulated by the railroad's first engineer, General Braxton Bragg, former commander of the Confederate Army of Tennessee. At a meeting of the board of directors on February 8, 1875, the board resolved to negotiate for land for both a depot and the location of the line from Galveston to an intersection of the Galveston, Harrisburg & San Antonio line. At other meetings in 1875, the board of directors asked for proposals for contracting the building of the bridge across Galveston Bay and for the laying of track to Arcola, Texas. On April 30, 1875, Henry Rosenberg, president of the GC&SF, signed a contract with Burnett and Kilpatrick that included the construction of a bridge across the bay, complete with a lifting draw, for $69,000. The depot grounds were located between 37th and 38th Streets and Mechanic and Strand. The railroad line was to follow Mechanic Street to 60th, where it would be routed to the bridge.

Construction began on May 1, 1875. By May 28, the line reached Arcola, with surveys made as far as the Brazos River. In September 1876, the Galveston, Houston, & Henderson Railroad completed a new passenger depot, located on the corner of Avenue A and Tremont Street. The GC&SF would share this depot for their passenger line once the trains began running continuously.

By March 1877, track from Galveston to Arcola was complete and arrangements were being made to put regular trains on the line. The company planned to cross the Brazos River and proceed to Richmond, where it would connect with the San Antonio line. This would make one continuous route to Galveston 11 miles shorter than any other road. By the next year, the company also completed an iron bridge 480 feet long over the Brazos River, and by October, a regular train was being run over the road.

In December 1878, the company began to experience financial difficulties. Directors voted to advertise for a loan of $250,000 for 90 days, which would enable them to pay off the debts and finish the road to Richmond. The only offer for the loan was made by a group of Galveston citizens headed by Galveston businessman George Sealy. The loan was secured by a deed of trust on the entire properties of the railway company. When the 90-day note matured, the company did not have the funds to pay for it. Therefore, on April 15, 1879, the entire properties of the line were sold at a public sale in front of the courthouse. The highest bid was for $200,000 made by George Sealy. The new company was organized, and directors were elected. By May, the new directors had organized a corps of engineers to locate the line to Brenham.

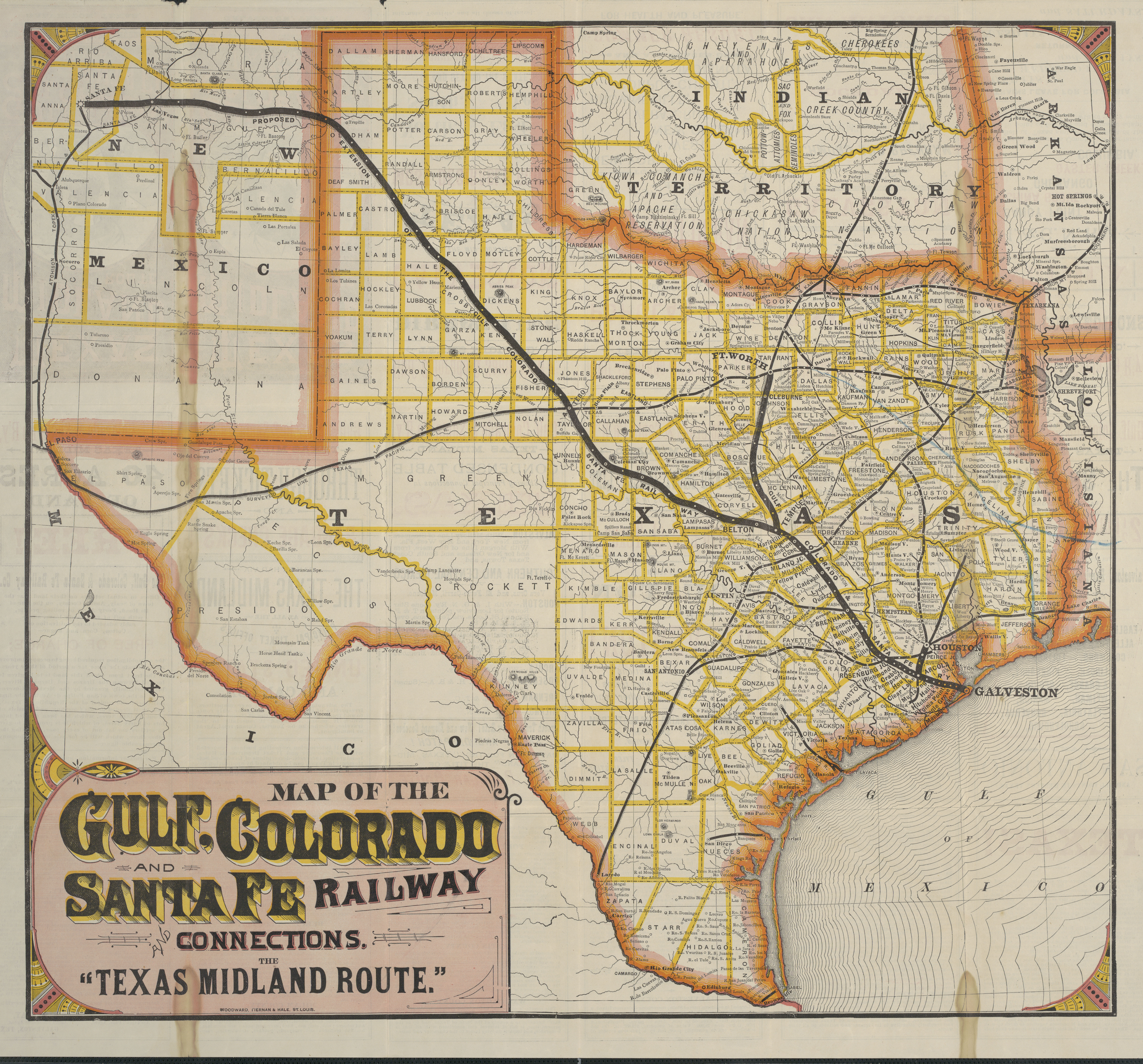
Map of the Gulf, Colorado and Santa Fe Railway, circa 1880, including a proposed northwest extension which would ultimately terminate at Sweetwater, Texas, rather than extending into New Mexico as shown

Chief engineer, Bernard Moore Temple, sent surveyors into the interior of Texas, and as the line was located, Temple followed with construction crews. The new directors also obtained rights to build a spur into Houston. By this time, the real importance of a line into Houston had been realized, and the success of the road depended on it. In 1880, the GC&SF won fame by establishing the first daily newspaper train in the U.S. Because of another quarantine placed on Galveston by Houston, the Galveston News arranged for a special train to carry the newspaper from Galveston to Rosenberg. There, the newspaper was transferred to the Galveston, Harrisburg & San Antonio Railroad, which distributed the news across Texas.

The road reached a distance of 226 miles upon reaching Belton in March 1881. The company had also constructed a telegraph line along the line of the railroad, and they began seeing a return on that investment that year, as well. In 1882, the main line reached Lampasas, and another branch opened from Alvin to Houston.

The company received support from many counties and communities along the line. Donations ranged in size from $70 given by Nickleville to $85,000 contributed by Fort Worth. Other small towns, such as Weatherford, Paris, Ladonia, Honey Grove, and Farmersville, also provided funds. Along the way, the railroad developed towns such as Rosenberg, Sealy, and Temple, which became a division point.

In the mid-1880s, chief engineer Temple was succeeded by engineer Walter Justin Sherman. Sherman encountered quite a few labor problems along the line. Especially in the hot summers, members of the construction crews would desert, and replacements were hard to find. GC&SF authorized a daily whiskey ration, and Sherman dispensed a dipper of liquor at the end of the day to each member of the crew in an effort to keep morale high.

As early as 1881, GC&SF attracted the attention of several large railroad magnates. Jay Gould, who held a monopoly in North Texas, presented a threat to the other Texas lines, including the GC&SF. William Barstow Strong, president of AT&SF, actively pursued a way to break Gould's stronghold on Texas railroad commerce.

Plagued by additional financial problems, Sealy and the other leaders of GC&SF realized the railway would need a connection north out of Texas if it were to survive. William Strong offered a connection between the two lines. On March 25, 1886, the stockholders authorized George Sealy to work toward an exchange of stock between the two companies.

The agreement stated that the GC&SF line would be built from Fort Worth to Purcell, in Indian Territory, and would connect there with the southbound AT&SF line. Then GC&SF was to build to Paris and connect with the St. Louis–San Francisco Railway, as well as build a branch from Cleburne to Weatherford. On April 26, 1887, Sherman reached Purcell, four hours ahead of schedule and before AT&SF crews. By June, trains began to run from Kansas City to Galveston.

With the completion of the line to Purcell, AT&SF assumed control of GC&SF. The contract, signed on March 3, 1886, by Sealy and Strong, provided for the transfer of the entire capital stock of GC&SF to AT&SF in exchange for $8 million in AT&SF stock. On March 23, representatives of the AT&SF were elected to the board of GC&SF and the merger was completed.

While GC&SF had officially become part of AT&SF, it was still an important section of the rail line. The fact that it connected so many major Texas cities with the most important port city in Texas made it a valuable acquisition.

An interesting transaction occurred in 1897, which is proof of the line's continuing growth. The GC&SF company and Fred Harvey, a famous railroad restaurateur, made an agreement. Harvey Restaurants and Harvey Houses, a hotel chain, soon dotted the AT&SF, providing inexpensive, comfortable dining for the patrons of the line. Both the restaurants and the railway have been celebrated in song, literature, and the entertainment media.

=== 20th century ===
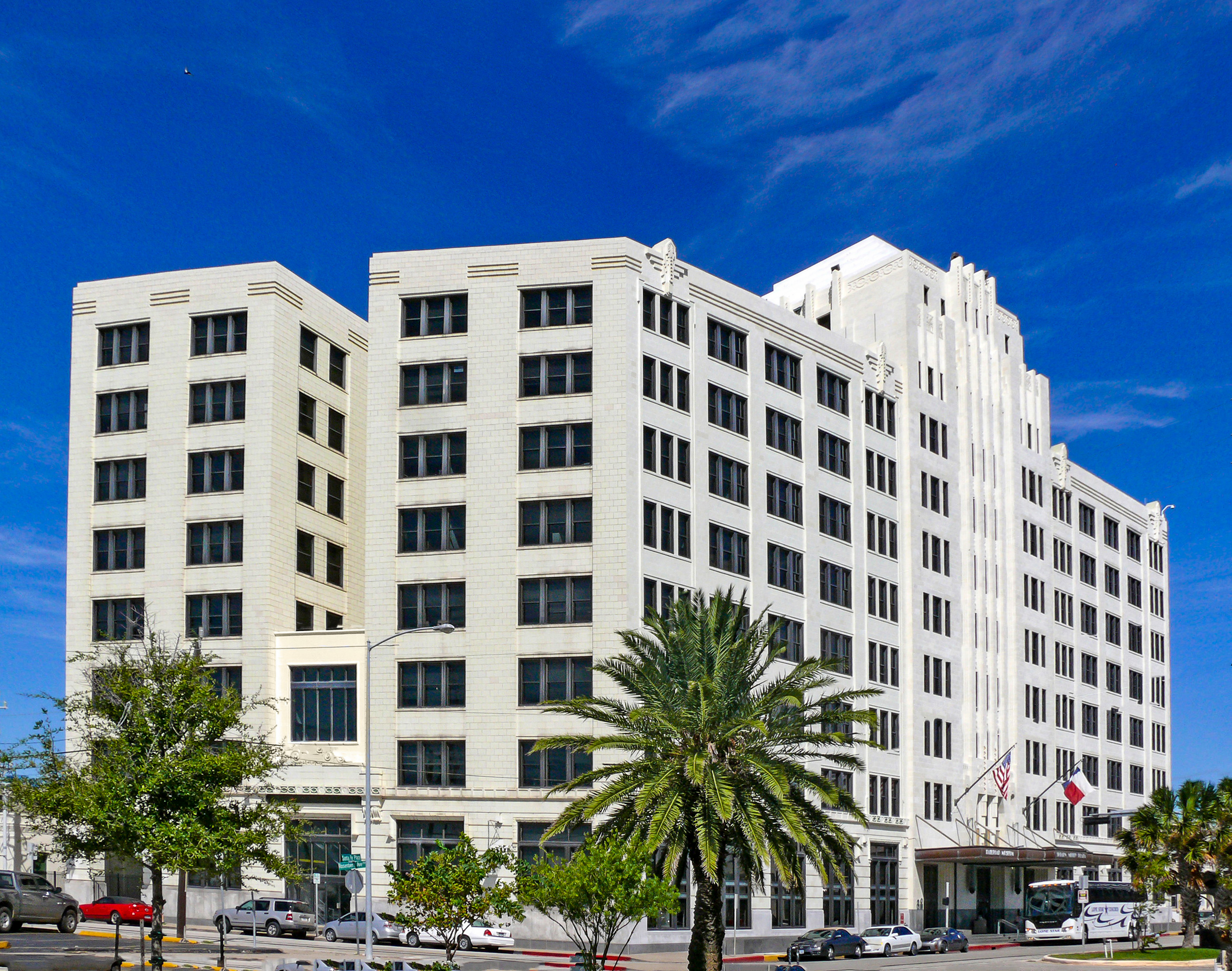
AT&SF Union Station in Galveston, Texas.

GC&SF also participated in Galveston's efforts to raise the city after the 1900 Galveston hurricane. In 1904, the board granted Goedhart and Bates a five-year lease to a strip of land on the east end of the Gulf Company in Galveston, which would be used for canal purposes in connection with the grade-raising of the city. In 1908 GC&SF, along with other railroads, worked to build a new causeway from Galveston to the mainland.

Construction of a 98-mile branch line from Lometa through San Saba and Brady to Eden was commenced in 1910 and completed by the end of the following year. By 1912, AT&SF announced plans to build a new union depot in Galveston that would also house the offices of GC&SF. Their plans were for an eight-story fireproof building made of steel-reinforced concrete and faced with white enameled brick. The waiting room would be 104 feet by 63 feet, and the building would be large enough to contain all of the departments of the GC&SF. An addition to the building was made in 1932, which included another eight-story building and an eleven-story tower. The company planned to spend $35,000 on remodeling the old building so that it would match the new structure. GC&SF also boasted of a new electric boiler plant, which would heat the entire building.

In 1937, AT&SF purchased the Fort Worth & Rio Grande Railway from SLSF and immediately leased it to GC&SF, thus gaining a valuable and shorter route to Fort Worth from the west and from the livestock-raising areas of the Edwards Plateau than the previous routing via Temple.

After World War II, AT&SF worked to expand its freight lines. The company used special trains to haul specific cargo. One of these trains was the 1949 Cotton Special, established to move the West Texas cotton crop from Lubbock to the Galveston wharves.

By the 1960s AT&SF worked with different corporations to expand. In one such instance AT&SF agreed to work with the Duval Corporation to develop a sulfur mine at Rustler Springs, Texas. AT&SF built a 30-mile branch line and conceived the ingenious idea of transporting the sulfur in a molten state from the mine to Galveston, where it would then be shipped by sea. This would make the sulfur easier to move over such a long distance. The sulfur was heated to 290 degrees and transported by tank car. This worked so well that the company bought three trains of 66 cars each, and a train moved continuously over the 930-mile run.

By this time, the identity of the GC&SF had become intertwined with that of AT&SF. In 1965, the remaining property of the Gulf division was conveyed to the AT&SF company.

== See also ==
- Krum, Texas (town founded by the railway company)
- Fort Worth and Rio Grande Railway (subsidiary bought in 1937)
- Nolan River Bridge 303-A of the Gulf, Colorado and Santa Fe Railway (National Register of Historic Places listed bridge)
