= Beatrice station (Nebraska) =

Rail depot

Beatrice
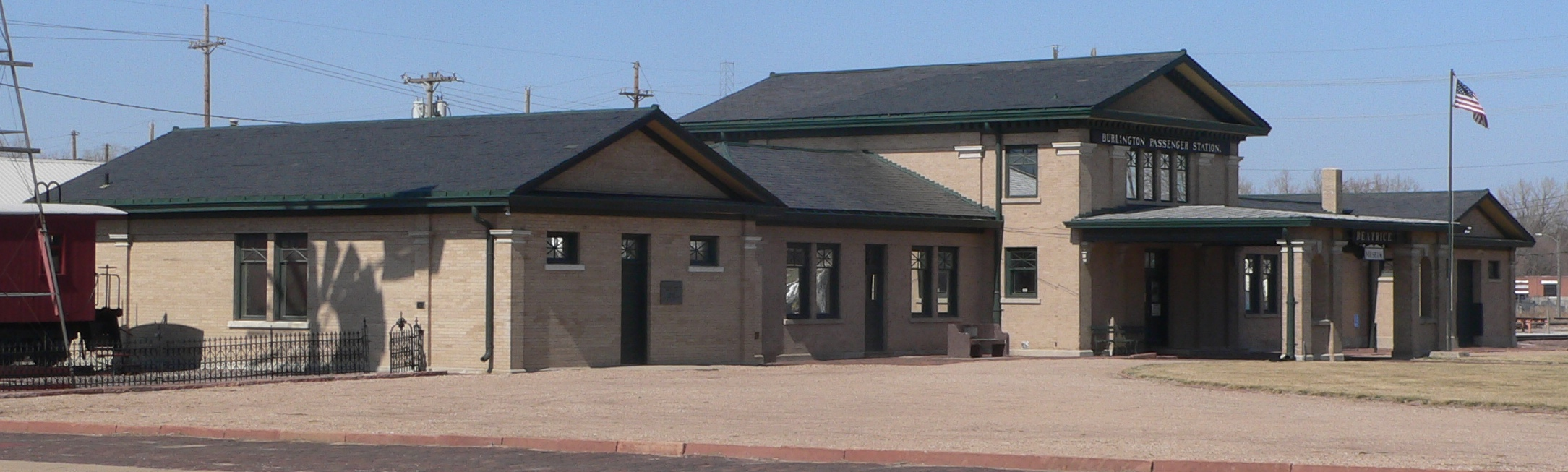
- Beatrice station (2012)

General information
- Location: 101 N. 2nd Street, Beatrice, Nebraska 68310
- System: Former Burlington Route passenger rail station

History
- Opened: 1906

Services
Preceding station	Burlington Route	Following station
Hoag toward Holdrege	Holdrege – Nebraska City	Rockford toward Nebraska City
Blue Springs toward Wymore	Lincoln – Wymore	Hoag toward Lincoln
- Burlington Northern Depot
- U.S. National Register of Historic Places
- Location within Nebraska
- Location: 101 N. 2nd Street, Beatrice, Nebraska
- Coordinates: 40°15′59″N 96°45′10″W
- Built: 1906
- Architect: W. T. Krausch
- Architectural style: Neo-Classical Revival
- NRHP reference No.: 75001092
- Added to NRHP: May 2, 1975
Location

Beatrice station, otherwise known as the Burlington Northern Depot in Beatrice, Nebraska is a historic railroad station which served trains of the Chicago, Burlington and Quincy Railroad (Burlington Route). The Neo-Classical Revival station was constructed in 1906.

In 1940, the station had daily railcar service to Holdrege and twice daily railcar service on the line between Lincoln and Wymore. In addition, several mixed trains served the station. By 1947, the railcar service to Holdrege had become a mixed train and by May 1951, service to Lincoln and Wymore had been reduced to once daily. Dedicated passenger service to Beatrice was completely gone by the May 1965 timetable.

The station was listed on the National Register of Historic Places on May 2, 1975 and is now occupied by a museum.
