= List of Amtrak stations =

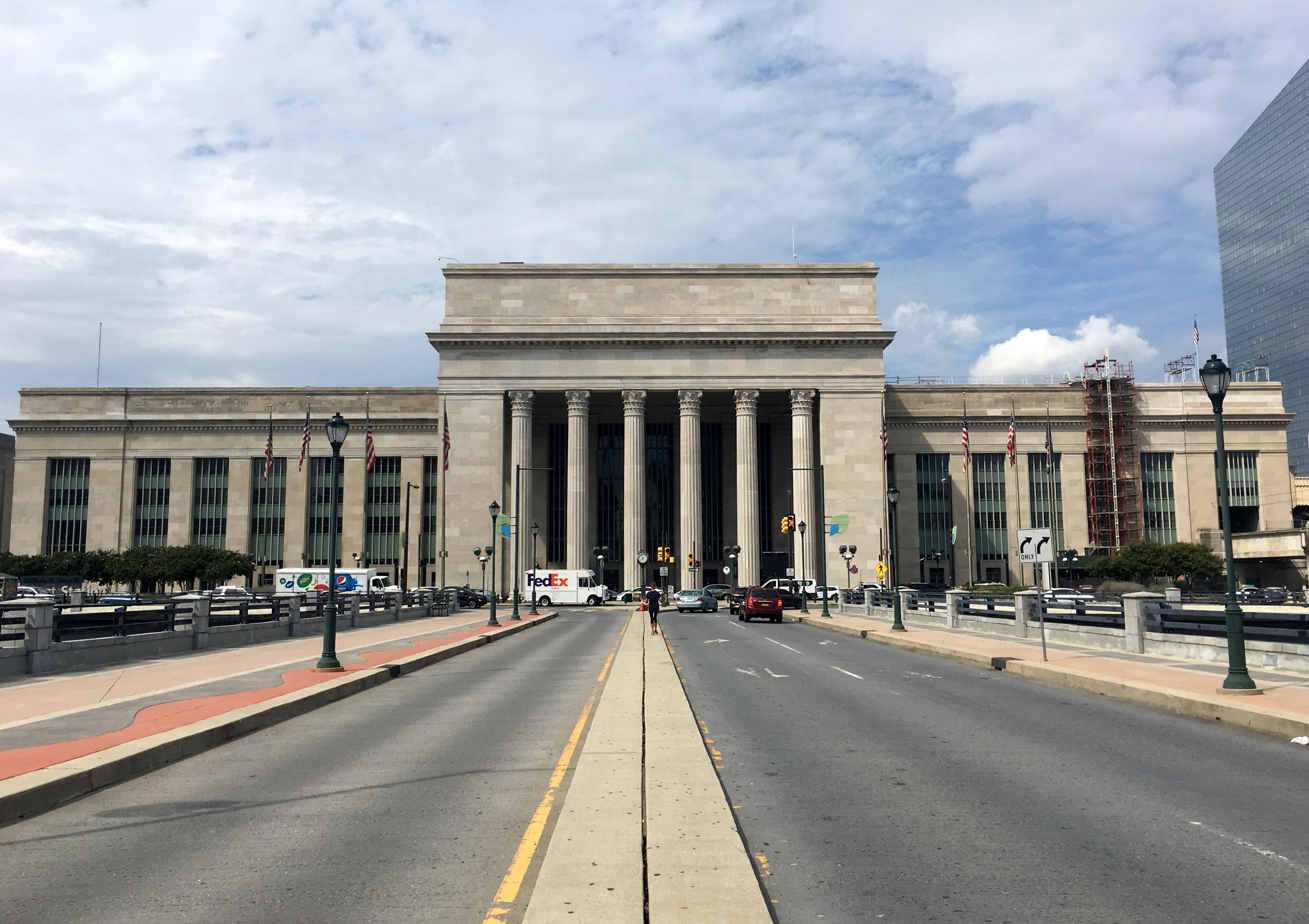
30th Street Station in Philadelphia

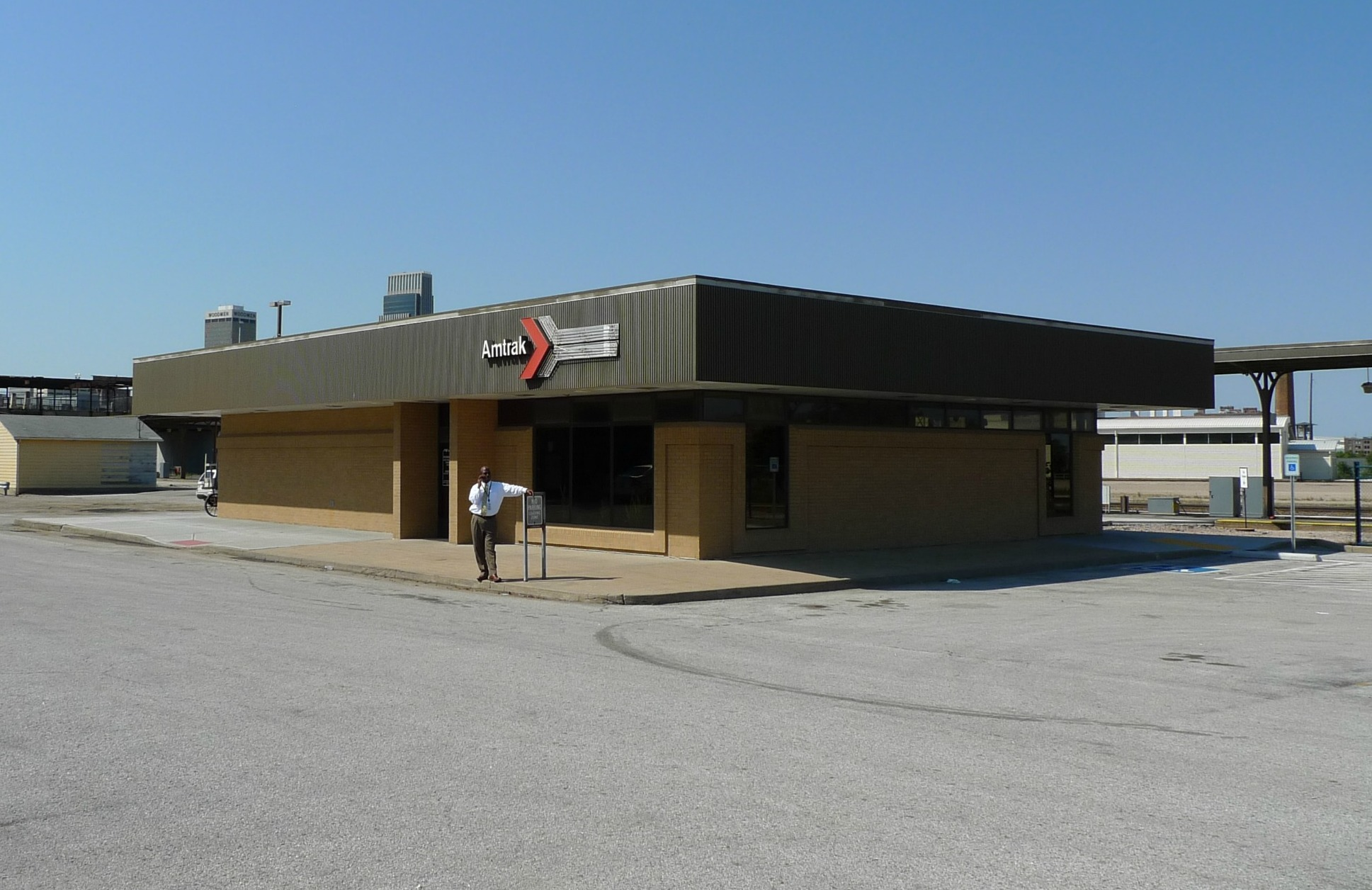
Omaha station in Omaha, Nebraska, designed as part of the Amtrak Standard Stations Program

Amtrak (National Railroad Passenger Corporation in the United States) operates train stations and Amtrak Thruway transit hubs throughout the United States. All current and most former Amtrak train stations and Thruway Motorcoach stops have a three-letter station code (sometimes also referred to as a city code). These codes do not necessarily correspond with the list of IATA-indexed train stations or the three-character IATA airport codes, although many are the same. Amtrak began using station codes in 1992. If a station code was used by more than one train station, each station is listed. However, if a station code was used for a Thruway Motorcoach stop that has changed locations, only information for the current location (or most recent location, if the stop is no longer in service) is included in the notes, unless one of the locations was an actual train station.

Ridership data and station ownership is from Amtrak's Great American Stations website. (Note: Each station located in Canada is identified as a Canadian railway station. However, since the Maple Leaf is a joint operation between Amtrak and Via Rail Canada, no ridership data is available for the stations where it stops in Canada.) The ownership of many stations is shared, with one entity owning one or more of the following: the facility itself, the parking lot, the passenger platform, and the train tracks. In some instances, the owner of the bus station used for a Thruway Motorcoach stop is not the same as the connection service provider.

Many stations do not offer full services (ticketing, baggage, etc.). Some stations and Thruway Motorcoach stops are conditional or flag stops, with trains only stopping at the station if reservations for a pickup or drop off are made in advance. Some stations are seasonal with trains or buses stopping only during certain times of the year.

Although Amtrak primarily serves the United States, three routes also serve Canada. The Maple Leaf is jointly operated with Via Rail Canada, while the Adirondack and Cascades are exclusively operated by Amtrak. There are also eight Thruway Motorcoach stops in British Columbia.

Among the Amtrak stations are several "tour only" stations which require special reservations with Amtrak for a group (usually twenty or more persons) for the train to stop at that station (such stations include Allensworth State Park and Marceline stations). There are also several "stations" (many of which are not actually train stations at all) which only operate in conjunction with regular special events (such "stations"/events include the Lexington Barbecue Festival, the New York State Fair, and the North Carolina State Fair).

== Active stations ==
Station	Station code	Location	State or province	Route	Opened	Rebuilt	Rail connections
Aberdeen	ABE	Aberdeen	MD	Northeast Regional	1898	1943	MARC Train
Albany	ALY	Albany	OR	Amtrak Cascades Coast Starlight	1977	—	
Albany–Rensselaer	ALB	Rensselaer	NY	Adirondack Berkshire Flyer – (seasonal) Empire Service Ethan Allen Express Lake Shore Limited Maple Leaf	1968	—	
Albion	ALI	Albion	MI	Wolverine	1882	—	
Albuquerque	ABQ	Albuquerque	NM	Southwest Chief	2008	—	NMRX New Mexico Rail Runner Express
Aldershot	AST	Aldershot	ON	Maple Leaf	1855	—	Via Rail; GO Transit
Alderson	ALD	Alderson	WV	Cardinal	1896	—	
Alexandria	ALX	Alexandria	VA	Cardinal Carolinian Crescent Floridian Northeast Regional Palmetto Silver Meteor	1905	1982	Virginia Railway Express; Washington Metro
Alliance	ALC	Alliance	OH	Floridian	1990	2012	
Alpine	ALP	Alpine	TX	Sunset Limited Texas Eagle	1946	—	
Alton	ALN	Alton	IL	Lincoln Service Texas Eagle	1928	1989, 2017	
Altoona	ALT	Altoona	PA	Pennsylvanian	1986	—	
Amsterdam	AMS	Amsterdam	NY	Empire Service Maple Leaf	1970	—	
Anaheim	ANA	Anaheim	CA	Pacific Surfliner	2014	—	Metrolink
Ann Arbor	ARB	Ann Arbor	MI	Wolverine	1983	—	
Anniston	ATN	Anniston	AL	Crescent	1879	1926, 2008	
Antioch–Pittsburg	ACA	Antioch	CA	Gold Runner	1984	—	
Arcadia Valley	ACD	Ironton	MO	Texas Eagle	2016	—	
Ardmore	ADM	Ardmore	OK	Heartland Flyer	1909	1916	
Ardmore	ARD	Ardmore	PA	Keystone Service	1870	1957	SEPTA Regional Rail
Arkadelphia	ARK	Arkadelphia	AR	Texas Eagle	1917	—	
Ashland	AKY	Ashland	KY	Cardinal	1998	—	
Ashland	ASD	Ashland	VA	Northeast Regional	1866	1890, 1923, 1985	
Atlanta Peachtree	ATL	Atlanta	GA	Crescent	1918	1918	
Auburn	ARN	Auburn	CA	Capitol Corridor	1865	1998	
Austin	AUS	Austin	TX	Texas Eagle	1947	—	
Bakersfield	BFD	Bakersfield	CA	Gold Runner	1899	2000	
Baltimore Penn	BAL	Baltimore	MD	Acela Cardinal Carolinian Crescent Northeast Regional Palmetto Silver Meteor Vermonter	1911	1984	Baltimore Light RailLink; MARC Train
Bangor	BAM	Bangor	MI	Pere Marquette	1926	2005	
Barstow	BAR	Barstow	CA	Southwest Chief	1911	—	
Battle Creek	BTL	Battle Creek	MI	Blue Water Wolverine	1982	2012	
Bay St. Louis	BAS	Bay St. Louis	MS	Mardi Gras Service	1929	2023	
Beaumont	BMT	Beaumont	TX	Sunset Limited	1861	2012	
Bellingham Fairhaven	BEL	Bellingham	WA	Amtrak Cascades	1995	—	
Bellows Falls	BLF	Bellows Falls	VT	Vermonter	1849, 1972, 1989	1851, 1922–1923	
Benson	BEN	Benson	AZ	Sunset Limited Texas Eagle	1880	—	
Berkeley	BKY	Berkeley	CA	Capitol Corridor	1913	1986	
Berlin	BER	Berlin	CT	Hartford Line Northeast Regional Valley Flyer	1839	1848, 1893, 1896, 1900, 2014–2018	Hartford Line
Biloxi	BIX	Biloxi	MS	Mardi Gras Service	1984	2023	
Bingen–White Salmon	BNG	Bingen	WA	Empire Builder	1981	1992	
Birmingham	BHM	Birmingham	AL	Crescent	1960	—	
Bloomington–Normal	BNL	Normal	IL	Lincoln Service Texas Eagle	1990	2012	
Boston Back Bay	BBY	Boston	MA	Acela Lake Shore Limited Northeast Regional	1860	1987	MBTA Commuter Rail; MBTA subway
Boston North	BON	Boston	MA	Downeaster	1928	1997	MBTA Commuter Rail; MBTA subway
Boston South	BOS	Boston	MA	Acela Lake Shore Limited Northeast Regional	1899	1985	MBTA Commuter Rail; MBTA subway
Brattleboro	BRA	Brattleboro	VT	Vermonter	1915	—	
Bridgeport	BRP	Bridgeport	CT	Northeast Regional Vermonter	1840, 1849	1903–1905, 1973–1975	Metro-North Railroad; Shore Line East
Brookhaven	BRH	Brookhaven	MS	City of New Orleans	1907	2011	
Browning	BRO	Browning	MT	Empire Builder	1973	—	
Brunswick	BRK	Brunswick	ME	Downeaster	2012	—	
Bryan	BYN	Bryan	OH	Lake Shore Limited	1869	—	
Buffalo–Depew	BUF	Depew	NY	Empire Service Lake Shore Limited Maple Leaf	1979	—	
Buffalo–Exchange Street	BFX	Buffalo	NY	Empire Service Maple Leaf	1952	—	Buffalo Metro Rail
Burbank Airport–South	BUR	Burbank	CA	Coast Starlight Pacific Surfliner	1983	—	Metrolink
Burbank Downtown	BBK	Burbank	CA	Pacific Surfliner	1992	—	Metrolink
Burke Centre	BCV	Burke	VA	Northeast Regional	1992	2008	Virginia Railway Express
Burlington	BRL	Burlington	IA	California Zephyr	1944	—	
Burlington	BNC	Burlington	NC	Carolinian Piedmont	2003	—	
Burlington	BTN	Burlington	VT	Ethan Allen Express	2022	—	
BWI Thurgood Marshall Airport	BWI	Linthicum	MD	Acela Crescent Northeast Regional Palmetto Vermonter	1980	—	MARC Train
Camarillo	CML	Camarillo	CA	Pacific Surfliner	1995	—	Metrolink
Camden	CAM	Camden	SC	Floridian	1937	—	
Carbondale	CDL	Carbondale	IL	City of New Orleans Illini and Saluki	1988	—	
Carlinville	CRV	Carlinville	IL	Lincoln Service Texas Eagle	—	2017	
Carpinteria	CPN	Carpinteria	CA	Pacific Surfliner	1997	—	
Cary	CYN	Cary	NC	Carolinian Floridian Piedmont	1995	1996	
Castleton	CNV	Castleton	VT	Ethan Allen Express	2010	—	
Centralia	CEN	Centralia	IL	City of New Orleans Illini and Saluki	1853	2003	
Centralia	CTL	Centralia	WA	Amtrak Cascades Coast Starlight	1912	2002	
Champaign–Urbana	CHM	Champaign	IL	City of New Orleans Illini and Saluki	1999	—	
Charleston	CHS	North Charleston	SC	Palmetto Silver Meteor	2018	—	
Charleston	CHW	Charleston	WV	Cardinal	1905	—	
Charlotte	CLT	Charlotte	NC	Carolinian Crescent Piedmont	1962	—	
Charlottesville	CVS	Charlottesville	VA	Cardinal Crescent Northeast Regional	1885	1915	
Chatsworth	CWT	Chatsworth	CA	Pacific Surfliner	1982	—	Metrolink
Chemult	CMO	Chemult	OR	Coast Starlight	1980	2010	
Chicago Union	CHI	Chicago	IL	Blue Water Borealis California Zephyr Cardinal City of New Orleans Empire Builder Floridian Hiawatha Illini and Saluki Illinois Zephyr and Carl Sandburg Lake Shore Limited Lincoln Service Pere Marquette Southwest Chief Texas Eagle Wolverine	1925	—	Metra; Chicago "L"
Chico	CIC	Chico	CA	Coast Starlight	1892	1988	
Cincinnati	CIN	Cincinnati	OH	Cardinal	1935	1991	
Claremont	CLA	Claremont	NH	Vermonter	1920	—	
Cleburne	CBR	Cleburne	TX	Texas Eagle	1898	1999	
Clemson	CSN	Clemson	SC	Crescent	1918	—	
Cleveland	CLE	Cleveland	OH	Floridian Lake Shore Limited	1975	1977	GCRTA
Clifton Forge	CLF	Clifton Forge	VA	Cardinal	1857	1906	
Coatesville	COT	Coatesville	PA	Keystone Service	1868	—	
Col Allensworth State Park	CNL	Allensworth	CA	Gold Runner – (flag stop)	1992	—	
Colfax	COX	Colfax	CA	California Zephyr	1905	c. 2000	
Columbia	CLB	Columbia	SC	Floridian	1991	—	
Columbus	CBS	Columbus	WI	Borealis Empire Builder	1906	—	
Connellsville	COV	Connellsville	PA	Floridian	2011	—	
Connersville	COI	Connersville	IN	Cardinal	1914	1990	
Corcoran	COC	Corcoran	CA	Gold Runner	1989	1999	
Cornwells Heights	CWH	Cornwells Heights	PA	Keystone Service	—	—	SEPTA Regional Rail
Crawfordsville	CRF	Crawfordsville	IN	Cardinal	1980	—	
Creston	CRN	Creston	IA	California Zephyr	1899	1969, 2019	
Croton–Harmon	CRT	Croton-on-Hudson	NY	Adirondack Berkshire Flyer – (seasonal) Empire Service Ethan Allen Express Lake Shore Limited Maple Leaf	1913	1963, 1988	Metro-North Railroad
Culpeper	CLP	Culpeper	VA	Cardinal Crescent Northeast Regional	—	—	
Cumberland	CUM	Cumberland	MD	Floridian	—	—	
Cut Bank	CUT	Cut Bank	MT	Empire Builder	1939	—	
Dallas	DAL	Dallas	TX	Texas Eagle	1916	1996, 2010	DART; Trinity Railway Express
Danville	DAN	Danville	VA	Crescent	1899	1922, 1995	
Davis	DAV	Davis	CA	California Zephyr Capitol Corridor Coast Starlight	1868	1986	
Dearborn	DER	Dearborn	MI	Wolverine	2014	—	
Deerfield Beach	DFB	Deerfield Beach	FL	Floridian Silver Meteor	1926	1990, 2010	Tri-Rail
Del Rio	DRT	Del Rio	TX	Sunset Limited Texas Eagle	1876	2023	
DeLand	DLD	DeLand	FL	Floridian Silver Meteor	1918	1988	SunRail
Delray Beach	DLB	Delray Beach	FL	Floridian Silver Meteor	1991	2004–2006	Tri-Rail
Deming	DEM	Deming	NM	Sunset Limited Texas Eagle	1881	—	
Denmark	DNK	Denmark	SC	Floridian	1978	—	
Denver	DEN	Denver	CO	California Zephyr Winter Park Express	1881	1914, 2010–2014	Rocky Mountaineer; RTD Bus & Rail
Detroit	DET	Detroit	MI	Wolverine	1994	—	QLine
Detroit Lakes	DLK	Detroit Lakes	MN	Empire Builder	1908	—	
Devils Lake	DVL	Devils Lake	ND	Empire Builder	1907	—	
Dillon	DIL	Dillon	SC	Palmetto	1904	—	
Dodge City	DDG	Dodge City	KS	Southwest Chief	1896	—	
Dover	DOV	Dover	NH	Downeaster	2001	—	
Dowagiac	DOA	Dowagiac	MI	Blue Water Wolverine	1848	—	
Downingtown	DOW	Downingtown	PA	Keystone Service	19th Century	1990s	SEPTA Regional Rail
Du Quoin	DQN	Du Quoin	IL	Illini and Saluki	1989	—	
Dunsmuir	DUN	Dunsmuir	CA	Coast Starlight	1887	—	
Durand	DRD	Durand	MI	Blue Water	1903	—	
Durham	DNC	Durham	NC	Carolinian Piedmont	1990	2009	
Durham–UNH	DHM	Durham	NH	Downeaster	2001	—	
Dwight	DWT	Dwight	IL	Lincoln Service	2016	—	
Dyer	DYE	Dyer	IN	Cardinal	1980	1986, 2014	
East Glacier Park	GPK	East Glacier Park	MT	Empire Builder	1913	—	
East Lansing	LNS	East Lansing	MI	Blue Water	1974	2016	
Edmonds	EDM	Edmonds	WA	Amtrak Cascades Empire Builder	1957	2010–2011	Sounder commuter rail
Effingham	EFG	Effingham	IL	City of New Orleans Illini and Saluki	—	—	
El Paso	ELP	El Paso	TX	Sunset Limited Texas Eagle	1906	1982	El Paso Streetcar
Elizabethtown	ELT	Elizabethtown	PA	Keystone Service Pennsylvanian	1915	2009–2011	
Elkhart	EKH	Elkhart	IN	Floridian Lake Shore Limited	1900	—	
Elko	ELK	Elko	NV	California Zephyr	1984	—	
Elyria	ELY	Elyria	OH	Floridian Lake Shore Limited	—	—	
Emeryville	EMY	Emeryville	CA	California Zephyr Capitol Corridor Coast Starlight Gold Runner	1993	—	
Ephrata	EPH	Ephrata	WA	Empire Builder	1973	1994	
Erie	ERI	Erie	PA	Lake Shore Limited	1927	2003	
Essex	ESM	Essex	MT	Empire Builder	1985	—	
Essex Junction	ESX	Essex Junction	VT	Vermonter	1859	1959	
Eugene–Springfield	EUG	Eugene	OR	Amtrak Cascades Coast Starlight	1908	2004	
Everett	EVR	Everett	WA	Amtrak Cascades Empire Builder	2002	—	Sounder commuter rail
Exeter	EXR	Exeter	NH	Downeaster	2001	—	
Exton	EXT	Exton	PA	Keystone Service	1981	—	SEPTA Regional Rail
Fairfield–Vacaville	FFV	Fairfield	CA	Capitol Corridor	2017	—	
Fargo	FAR	Fargo	ND	Empire Builder	1906	1995	
Fayetteville	FAY	Fayetteville	NC	Palmetto Silver Meteor	1911	2005–2006	
Ferrisburgh–Vergennes	VRN	Ferrisburgh	VT	Ethan Allen Express	2022		
Flagstaff	FLG	Flagstaff	AZ	Southwest Chief	1926	—	
Flint	FLN	Flint	MI	Blue Water	1989	—	
Florence	FLO	Florence	SC	Palmetto Silver Meteor	1996	—	
Fort Edward	FED	Fort Edward	NY	Adirondack Ethan Allen Express	1974	—	
Fort Lauderdale	FTL	Fort Lauderdale	FL	Floridian Silver Meteor	1927	1986	Tri-Rail
Fort Madison	FMD	Fort Madison	IA	Southwest Chief	2021	—	
Fort Morgan	FMG	Fort Morgan	CO	California Zephyr	—	—	
Fort Worth	FTW	Fort Worth	TX	Heartland Flyer Texas Eagle	2001	—	TEXRail; Trinity Railway Express
Framingham	FRA	Framingham	MA	Lake Shore Limited	1834	1848, 1885, 2001	MBTA Commuter Rail
Fraser–Winter Park	WIP	Fraser	CO	California Zephyr Winter Park Express	1985	—	
Fredericksburg	FBG	Fredericksburg	VA	Carolinian Northeast Regional Silver Meteor	1910	2010–2011	Virginia Railway Express
Freeport	FRE	Freeport	ME	Downeaster	2012	—	
Fremont	FMT	Fremont	CA	Capitol Corridor	2017	—	Altamont Corridor Express
Fresno	FNO	Fresno	CA	Gold Runner	1974	2005	
Fullerton	FUL	Fullerton	CA	Pacific Surfliner Southwest Chief	1930	1993	Metrolink
Fulton	FTN	Fulton	KY	City of New Orleans	—	—	
Gainesville	GNS	Gainesville	GA	Crescent	1910	—	
Gainesville	GLE	Gainesville	TX	Heartland Flyer	1902	—	
Galesburg	GBB	Galesburg	IL	California Zephyr Illinois Zephyr and Carl Sandburg Southwest Chief	1984	—	
Gallup	GLP	Gallup	NM	Southwest Chief	1918	—	
Garden City	GCK	Garden City	KS	Southwest Chief	1907	1957, 2002	
Gastonia	GAS	Gastonia	NC	Crescent	1966	—	
Gilman	GLM	Gilman	IL	Illini and Saluki	1986	—	
Glasgow	GGW	Glasgow	MT	Empire Builder	1893	—	
Glendale	GDL	Glendale	CA	Pacific Surfliner	1923	1999	Metrolink
Glenview	GLN	Glenview	IL	Borealis Empire Builder Hiawatha	1995	—	Metra
Glenwood Springs	GSC	Glenwood Springs	CO	California Zephyr	1904	—	Rocky Mountaineer
Goleta	GTA	Goleta	CA	Pacific Surfliner	1998	—	
Granby	GRA	Granby	CO	California Zephyr	1987	—	
Grand Forks	GFK	Grand Forks	ND	Empire Builder	1982	—	
Grand Junction	GJT	Grand Junction	CO	California Zephyr	1906	—	
Grand Rapids	GRR	Grand Rapids	MI	Pere Marquette	1984	2014	
Green River	GRI	Green River	UT	California Zephyr	1997	—	
Greenfield	GFD	Greenfield	MA	Valley Flyer Vermonter	2014	—	
Greensboro	GRO	Greensboro	NC	Carolinian Crescent Piedmont	1927	2005	
Greensburg	GNB	Greensburg	PA	Pennsylvanian	1912	1995	
Greenville	GRV	Greenville	SC	Crescent	1988	—	
Greenwood	GWD	Greenwood	MS	City of New Orleans	1917	1995	
Grimsby	GMS	Grimsby	ON	Maple Leaf	1902	Late 1990s	
Grover Beach	GVB	Grover Beach	CA	Pacific Surfliner	1996	—	
Guadalupe	GUA	Guadalupe	CA	Pacific Surfliner	1998	—	
Gulfport	GUF	Gulfport	MS	Mardi Gras Service	1984	2023	
Hamlet	HAM	Hamlet	NC	Floridian	1900	2002–2004	
Hammond	HMD	Hammond	LA	City of New Orleans	—	1912	
Hammond–Whiting	HMI	Hammond	IN	Wolverine	1982	—	
Hanford	HNF	Hanford	CA	Gold Runner	1897, 1974	1991	
Harpers Ferry	HFY	Harpers Ferry	WV	Floridian	1889	—	MARC Train
Harrisburg	HAR	Harrisburg	PA	Keystone Service Pennsylvanian	1887	1905, 1986	
Hartford	HFD	Hartford	CT	Hartford Line Northeast Regional Valley Flyer Vermonter	1889	1914, 1987	Hartford Line
Hastings	HAS	Hastings	NE	California Zephyr	1902	1966, 2000	
Hattiesburg	HBG	Hattiesburg	MS	Crescent	1910	2007	
Haverhill	HHL	Haverhill	MA	Downeaster	1979	—	MBTA Commuter Rail
Havre	HAV	Havre	MT	Empire Builder	1907	1953	
Hayward	HAY	Hayward	CA	Capitol Corridor	1997	—	
Hazlehurst	HAZ	Hazlehurst	MS	City of New Orleans	1972	1974	
Helper	HER	Helper	UT	California Zephyr	1997	—	
Hermann	HEM	Hermann	MO	Missouri River Runner	1991	—	
High Point	HPT	High Point	NC	Carolinian Crescent Piedmont	1907	2002–2003	
Hinton	HIN	Hinton	WV	Cardinal	1872	—	
Holdrege	HLD	Holdrege	NE	California Zephyr	1911	2020	
Holland	HOM	Holland	MI	Pere Marquette	1926	1991	
Hollywood	HOL	Hollywood	FL	Floridian Silver Meteor	1928	2002	Tri-Rail
Holyoke	HLK	Holyoke	MA	Valley Flyer Vermonter	2015	—	
Homewood	HMW	Homewood	IL	City of New Orleans Illini and Saluki	1923	—	Metra
Hope	HOP	Hope	AR	Texas Eagle	2013	—	
Houston	HOS	Houston	TX	Sunset Limited	1959	—	
Hudson	HUD	Hudson	NY	Adirondack Berkshire Flyer – (seasonal) Empire Service Ethan Allen Express Maple Leaf	1874	1992	
Huntingdon	HGD	Huntingdon	PA	Pennsylvanian	1872	—	
Huntington	HUN	Huntington	WV	Cardinal	1873	1983	
Hutchinson	HUT	Hutchinson	KS	Southwest Chief	1897	1950	
Independence	IDP	Independence	MO	Missouri River Runner	1913	1995	
Indianapolis	IND	Indianapolis	IN	Cardinal	1853	1888, 1984, 2002	
Irvine	IRV	Irvine	CA	Pacific Surfliner	1990	—	Metrolink
Jackson	JXN	Jackson	MI	Wolverine	1841	1872, 1978	
Jackson	JAN	Jackson	MS	City of New Orleans	1927	2003–2004	
Jacksonville	JAX	Jacksonville	FL	Floridian Silver Meteor	1974	—	
Jefferson City	JEF	Jefferson City	MO	Missouri River Runner	1855	1984	
Jesup	JSP	Jesup	GA	Silver Meteor	1979	—	
Johnstown	JST	Johnstown	PA	Pennsylvanian	1916	1985	
Joliet	JOL	Joliet	IL	Lincoln Service Texas Eagle	2014, 2018	—	Metra
Kalamazoo	KAL	Kalamazoo	MI	Blue Water Wolverine	1886	2006	
Kankakee	KKI	Kankakee	IL	City of New Orleans Illini and Saluki	1898	—	
Kannapolis	KAN	Kannapolis	NC	Carolinian Piedmont	2004	—	
Kansas City	KCY	Kansas City	MO	Missouri River Runner Southwest Chief	1914	2002	KC Streetcar
Kelso	KEL	Kelso	WA	Amtrak Cascades Coast Starlight	1912	1995	
Kewanee	KEE	Kewanee	IL	Illinois Zephyr and Carl Sandburg	1986	2012	
Kingman	KNG	Kingman	AZ	Southwest Chief	1907	—	
Kingston	KIN	Kingston	RI	Northeast Regional	1875	1998, 2017	
Kingstree	KTR	Kingstree	SC	Palmetto Silver Meteor	1909	—	
Kirkwood	KWD	Kirkwood	MO	Missouri River Runner	1893	—	
Kissimmee	KIS	Kissimmee	FL	Floridian Silver Meteor	1975	—	SunRail
Klamath Falls	KFS	Klamath Falls	OR	Coast Starlight	1916	—	
La Crosse	LSE	La Crosse	WI	Borealis Empire Builder	1926	1997	
La Grange	LAG	La Grange	IL	Illinois Zephyr and Carl Sandburg	1916	—	Metra
La Junta	LAJ	La Junta	CO	Southwest Chief	1955	—	
La Plata	LAP	La Plata	MO	Southwest Chief	1945	1996–2001	
Lafayette	LAF	Lafayette	IN	Cardinal	1902	1994	
Lafayette	LFT	Lafayette	LA	Sunset Limited	1911–1912	2002	
Lake Charles	LCH	Lake Charles	LA	Sunset Limited	1992	—	
Lakeland	LAK/LKL	Lakeland	FL	Floridian	1998	—	
Lamar	LMR	Lamar	CO	Southwest Chief	1907	—	
Lamy	LMY	Lamy	NM	Southwest Chief	1909	—	Santa Fe Southern Railway
Lancaster	LNC	Lancaster	PA	Keystone Service Pennsylvanian	1929	—	
Lapeer	LPE	Lapeer	MI	Blue Water	1900	1991, 2004	
Las Vegas	LSV	Las Vegas	NM	Southwest Chief	1899	—	
Latrobe	LAB	Latrobe	PA	Pennsylvanian	1850s	1903	
Laurel	LAU	Laurel	MS	Crescent	1913	—	
Lawrence	LRC	Lawrence	KS	Southwest Chief	1956	—	
Leavenworth	LWA	Leavenworth	WA	Empire Builder	2009	—	
Lee's Summit	LEE	Lee's Summit	MO	Missouri River Runner	2009	—	
Lewistown	LEW	Lewistown	PA	Pennsylvanian	1849	1985–1999	
Lexington	LEX	Lexington	NC	Carolinian Piedmont	—	—	
Libby	LIB	Libby	MT	Empire Builder	1892	1941	
Lincoln	LCN	Lincoln	IL	Lincoln Service Texas Eagle	1911	2017	
Lincoln	LNK	Lincoln	NE	California Zephyr	2012	—	
Little Rock	LRK	Little Rock	AR	Texas Eagle	1921	1992	
Lodi	LOD	Lodi	CA	Gold Runner	2002	—	
Lompoc–Surf	LPS	Surf	CA	Pacific Surfliner	2000	—	
Longview	LVW	Longview	TX	Texas Eagle	1940	—	
Lordsburg	LDB	Lordsburg	NM	Sunset Limited Texas Eagle	—	—	
Lorton	LOR	Lorton	VA	Auto Train	1971	2000	
Los Angeles Union	LAX	Los Angeles	CA	Coast Starlight Pacific Surfliner Southwest Chief Sunset Limited Texas Eagle	1939	—	Los Angeles Metro Rail; Metrolink
Lynchburg–Kemper Street	LYH	Lynchburg	VA	Crescent Northeast Regional	1912	2002	
Macomb	MAC	Macomb	IL	Illinois Zephyr and Carl Sandburg	1913	—	
Madera	MDR	Madera	CA	Gold Runner	2010	—	
Malta	MAL	Malta	MT	Empire Builder	—	—	
Malvern	MVN	Malvern	AR	Texas Eagle	1916	—	
Manassas	MSS	Manassas	VA	Cardinal Crescent Northeast Regional	1914	1997	Virginia Railway Express
Maricopa	MRC	Maricopa	AZ	Sunset Limited Texas Eagle	2001	—	
Marks	MKS	Marks	MS	City of New Orleans	2018	—	
Marshall	MHL	Marshall	TX	Texas Eagle	1974	—	
Martinez	MTZ	Martinez	CA	California Zephyr Capitol Corridor Coast Starlight Gold Runner	1877	2001	
Martinsburg	MRB	Martinsburg	WV	Floridian	1848	—	MARC Train
Mattoon	MAT	Mattoon	IL	City of New Orleans Illini and Saluki	1855	1860, 1918	
Maysville	MAY	Maysville	KY	Cardinal	1918	1977	
McComb	MCB	McComb	MS	City of New Orleans	1901	1998, 2003	
McCook	MCK	McCook	NE	California Zephyr	1882	1926	
McGregor	MCG	McGregor	TX	Texas Eagle	1904	—	
Memphis Central	MEM	Memphis	TN	City of New Orleans	1914	—	MATA Trolley
Mendota	MDT	Mendota	IL	Illinois Zephyr and Carl Sandburg Southwest Chief	1888	—	
Merced	MCD	Merced	CA	Gold Runner	1896, 1974	1917, 2000	
Meriden	MDN	Meriden	CT	Hartford Line Northeast Regional Valley Flyer Vermonter	1839	1882, 1942, 1970, 2014–2017	Hartford Line
Meridian	MEI	Meridian	MS	Crescent	1906	1997	
Metropark	MET	Iselin	NJ	Acela Crescent Keystone Service Northeast Regional Palmetto Pennsylvanian Vermonter	1971	2007–2010 (refurbishment)	NJ Transit
Miami	MIA	Miami	FL	Floridian Silver Meteor	1978	—	
Middlebury	MBY	Middlebury	VT	Ethan Allen Express	2022	—	
Middletown	MID	Middletown	PA	Keystone Service	1990	—	
Milwaukee	MKE	Milwaukee	WI	Borealis Empire Builder Hiawatha	1965	2007	The Hop
Milwaukee Airport	MKA	Milwaukee	WI	Borealis Hiawatha	2005	—	
Mineola	MIN	Mineola	TX	Texas Eagle	1996	—	
Minot	MOT	Minot	ND	Empire Builder	1910	1975, 2008–2010	
Mobile	MOE	Mobile	AL	Mardi Gras Service	1956	2024	
Modesto	MOD	Modesto	CA	Gold Runner	1999	—	
Montgomery	MNG	Montgomery	WV	Cardinal	—	2020	
Montpelier	MPR	Montpelier	VT	Vermonter	1943	1960s	
Montreal	MTR	Montreal	QC	Adirondack	1943	—	Exo commuter rail REM; Via Rail; Montreal Metro
Moorpark	MPK	Moorpark	CA	Pacific Surfliner	1992	—	Metrolink
Mount Joy	MJY	Mount Joy	PA	Keystone Service	—	2019	
Mount Pleasant	MTP	Mount Pleasant	IA	California Zephyr	—	—	
Mount Vernon	MVW	Mount Vernon	WA	Amtrak Cascades	1972	1995, 2004	
Mystic	MYS	Mystic	CT	Northeast Regional	1858	1866–1905	
Naperville	NPV	Naperville	IL	California Zephyr Illinois Zephyr and Carl Sandburg Southwest Chief	1910	—	Metra
Needles	NDL	Needles	CA	Southwest Chief	1908	—	
New Brunswick	NBK	New Brunswick	NJ	Keystone Service Northeast Regional	1838	1903	NJ Transit
New Buffalo	NBU	New Buffalo	MI	Blue Water Wolverine	2009	—	
New Carrollton	NCR	New Carrollton	MD	Northeast Regional Palmetto Vermonter	1983	—	MARC Train; Washington Metro
New Haven Union	NHV	New Haven	CT	Acela Hartford Line Northeast Regional Valley Flyer Vermonter	1920	—	Hartford Line; Metro-North Railroad; Shore Line East
New Haven State Street	STS	New Haven	CT	Hartford Line Northeast Regional Valley Flyer	2002	2018	Hartford Line; Metro-North Railroad; Shore Line East
New Iberia	NIB	New Iberia	LA	Sunset Limited	1900	—	
New London	NLC	New London	CT	Northeast Regional	1848, 1852	1861, 1864	Shore Line East
New Orleans	NOL	New Orleans	LA	City of New Orleans Crescent Mardi Gras Service Sunset Limited	1954	2005	46 Rampart–Loyola Streetcar Line
New Rochelle	NRO	New Rochelle	NY	Northeast Regional	1987	—	Metro-North Railroad
New York Penn	NYP	New York	NY	Acela Adirondack Berkshire Flyer – (seasonal) Cardinal Carolinian Crescent Empire Service Ethan Allen Express Keystone Service Lake Shore Limited Maple Leaf Northeast Regional Palmetto Pennsylvanian Silver Meteor Vermonter	1910	1964	Long Island Rail Road; NJ Transit; New York City Subway; PATH
New York State Fair	NYF	Syracuse	NY	Empire Service Maple Leaf	2002	—	
Newark	NRK	Newark	DE	Northeast Regional	1877	—	SEPTA Regional Rail
Newark Liberty International Airport	EWR	Newark	NJ	Keystone Service Northeast Regional	2001	—	AirTrain Newark; NJ Transit
Newark Penn	NWK	Newark	NJ	Acela Cardinal Carolinian Crescent Keystone Service Northeast Regional Palmetto Pennsylvanian Silver Meteor Vermonter	1935	—	NJ Transit; PATH
Newbern–Dyersburg	NBN	Newbern	TN	City of New Orleans	1992	—	
Newport News	NPN	Newport News	VA	Northeast Regional	2024	—	
Newton	NEW	Newton	KS	Southwest Chief	1930	2008	
Niagara Falls	NFL	Niagara Falls	NY	Empire Service Maple Leaf	2016	—	
Niagara Falls	NFS	Niagara Falls	ON	Maple Leaf	1879	—	GO Transit
Niles	NLS	Niles	MI	Blue Water Wolverine	1892	2003	
Norfolk	NFK	Norfolk	VA	Northeast Regional	2012	2013	The Tide
Norman	NOR	Norman	OK	Heartland Flyer	1999	—	
North Carolina State Fair	NSF	Raleigh	NC	Carolinian Piedmont	1990	—	
North Philadelphia	PHN	Philadelphia	PA	Keystone Service	1870s	1896–1901, 1912–1915, 1955, 1977, 1991	SEPTA Regional Rail; SEPTA Rapid Transit
Northampton	NHT	Northampton	MA	Valley Flyer Vermonter	2014	—	
Northridge	NRG	Northridge	CA	Pacific Surfliner	1994	2000	Metrolink
Oakland Coliseum	OAC	Oakland	CA	Capitol Corridor	2005	—	Bay Area Rapid Transit
Oakland–Jack London Square	OKJ	Oakland	CA	Capitol Corridor Coast Starlight Gold Runner	1995	—	
Oakville	OKL	Oakville	ON	Maple Leaf	1967	2012	GO Transit; Via Rail
Oceanside	OSD	Oceanside	CA	Pacific Surfliner	1886	1984	COASTER; Metrolink; SPRINTER
Okeechobee	OKE	Okeechobee	FL	Floridian	1986	2011	
Oklahoma City	OKC	Oklahoma City	OK	Heartland Flyer	1999	—	Oklahoma City Streetcar
Old Orchard Beach	ORB	Old Orchard Beach	ME	Downeaster	2003	—	
Old Saybrook	OSB	Old Saybrook	CT	Northeast Regional	1873	2002	Shore Line East
Olympia–Lacey	OLW	Lacey	WA	Amtrak Cascades Coast Starlight	1993	—	
Omaha	OMA	Omaha	NE	California Zephyr	1983	—	
Ontario	ONA	Ontario	CA	Sunset Limited Texas Eagle	1994	—	
Oregon City	ORC	Oregon City	OR	Amtrak Cascades	2004	—	
Orlando	ORL	Orlando	FL	Floridian Silver Meteor	1926	—	SunRail
Osceola	OSC	Osceola	IA	California Zephyr	1907	—	
Ottumwa	OTM	Ottumwa	IA	California Zephyr	—	1951	
Oxnard	OXN	Oxnard	CA	Coast Starlight Pacific Surfliner	1987	—	Metrolink
Palatka	PAK	Palatka	FL	Floridian Silver Meteor	1909	—	
Palm Springs	PSN	Palm Springs	CA	Sunset Limited Texas Eagle	1997	—	
Paoli	PAO	Paoli	PA	Keystone Service Pennsylvanian	1893	1953, 2019–Present (Phase 1 complete)	SEPTA Regional Rail
Parkesburg	PAR	Parkesburg	PA	Keystone Service	—	—	
Pascagoula	PAG	Pascagoula	MS	Mardi Gras Service	1904	2023	
Pasco	PSC	Pasco	WA	Empire Builder	1998	—	
Paso Robles	PRB	Paso Robles	CA	Coast Starlight	1996	—	
Pauls Valley	PVL	Pauls Valley	OK	Heartland Flyer	1999	—	
Petersburg	PTB	Petersburg	VA	Carolinian Floridian Northeast Regional Palmetto Silver Meteor	1955	—	
Philadelphia 30th Street	PHL	Philadelphia	PA	Acela Cardinal Carolinian Crescent Keystone Service Northeast Regional Palmetto Pennsylvanian Silver Meteor Vermonter	1933	—	NJ Transit; SEPTA Regional Rail; SEPTA Rapid Transit; SEPTA subway–surface trolley lines
Picayune	PIC	Picayune	MS	Crescent	—	2008	
Pittsburgh	PGH	Pittsburgh	PA	Floridian Pennsylvanian	1903	1954, 1988	Pittsburgh Light Rail
Pittsfield	PIT	Pittsfield	MA	Berkshire Flyer – (seasonal) Lake Shore Limited	1975	2004	
Plano	PLO	Plano	IL	Illinois Zephyr and Carl Sandburg	1913	—	
Plattsburgh	PLB	Plattsburgh	NY	Adirondack	1886	—	
Pomona	POS	Pomona	CA	Sunset Limited Texas Eagle	1940	—	Metrolink
Pontiac	PON	Pontiac	IL	Lincoln Service Texas Eagle	—	1901, 2017	
Pontiac	PNT	Pontiac	MI	Wolverine	1983	2011	
Poplar Bluff	PBF	Poplar Bluff	MO	Texas Eagle	1910	—	
Port Henry	POH	Port Henry	NY	Adirondack	1888	—	
Port Huron	PTH	Port Huron	MI	Blue Water	1979	—	
Portage	POG	Portage	WI	Borealis Empire Builder	—	—	
Portland	POR	Portland	ME	Downeaster	2001	—	
Portland	PDX	Portland	OR	Amtrak Cascades Coast Starlight Empire Builder	1896	1996	MAX Light Rail; Portland Streetcar
Poughkeepsie	POU	Poughkeepsie	NY	Adirondack Berkshire Flyer – (seasonal) Empire Service Ethan Allen Express Lake Shore Limited Maple Leaf	1918	2009	Metro-North Railroad
Prince	PRC	Prince	WV	Cardinal	1886	1946	
Princeton	PCT	Princeton	IL	California Zephyr Illinois Zephyr and Carl Sandburg Southwest Chief	1911	1998	
Princeton Junction	PJC	West Windsor	NJ	Keystone Service Northeast Regional	1864	—	NJ Transit
Providence	PVD	Providence	RI	Acela Northeast Regional	1986	—	MBTA Commuter Rail
Provo	PRO	Provo	UT	California Zephyr	2002	—	FrontRunner
Purcell	PUR	Purcell	OK	Heartland Flyer	2001	—	
Quantico	QAN	Quantico	VA	Carolinian Northeast Regional	1971	—	Virginia Railway Express
Quincy	QCY	Quincy	IL	Illinois Zephyr and Carl Sandburg	1985	—	
Raleigh Union	RGH	Raleigh	NC	Carolinian Floridian Piedmont	2018	—	
Randolph	RPH	Randolph	VT	Vermonter	1848, 1996	1877	
Rantoul	RTL	Rantoul	IL	Illini and Saluki	—	—	
Raton	RAT	Raton	NM	Southwest Chief	1903	—	
Red Wing	RDW	Red Wing	MN	Borealis Empire Builder	1905	1990	
Redding	RDD	Redding	CA	Coast Starlight	1923	2002	
Reno	RNO	Reno	NV	California Zephyr	1926	2007	
Rensselaer	REN	Rensselaer	IN	Cardinal	1981	2011–2013	
Rhinecliff–Kingston	RHI	Rhinecliff	NY	Adirondack Berkshire Flyer – (seasonal) Empire Service Ethan Allen Express Lake Shore Limited Maple Leaf	1914	2011	
Richmond	RIC	Richmond	CA	California Zephyr Capitol Corridor Gold Runner	1978	2007	Bay Area Rapid Transit
Richmond Main Street	RVM	Richmond	VA	Northeast Regional	2003	—	
Richmond Staples Mill Road	RVR	Dumbarton	VA	Carolinian Floridian Northeast Regional Palmetto Silver Meteor	1975	—	
Riverside	RIV	Riverside	CA	Southwest Chief	2002	—	Metrolink
Roanoke	RNK	Roanoke	VA	Northeast Regional	1975	2017	
Rochester	ROC	Rochester	NY	Empire Service Lake Shore Limited Maple Leaf	1914	2017	
Rocklin	RLN	Rocklin	CA	Capitol Corridor	1998	2006	
Rockville	RKV	Rockville	MD	Floridian	1984	—	MARC Train; Washington Metro
Rocky Mount	RMT	Rocky Mount	NC	Carolinian Floridian Palmetto Silver Meteor	1893	2000	
Rome	ROM	Rome	NY	Empire Service Maple Leaf	1914	2017	
Roseville	RSV	Roseville	CA	California Zephyr Capitol Corridor	1994	—	
Rouses Point	RSP	Rouses Point	NY	Adirondack	1889	2014	
Route 128/University Park	RTE	Westwood	MA	Acela Northeast Regional	1953	2000	MBTA Commuter Rail
Royal Oak	ROY	Royal Oak	MI	Wolverine	1995	—	
Rugby	RUG	Rugby	ND	Empire Builder	1907	—	
Rutland	RUD	Rutland	VT	Ethan Allen Express	1996	1999	
Saco–Biddeford	SAO	Saco	ME	Downeaster	2001	—	
Sacramento	SAC	Sacramento	CA	California Zephyr Capitol Corridor Coast Starlight Gold Runner	1926	—	SacRT light rail
Salem	SLM	Salem	OR	Amtrak Cascades Coast Starlight	1918	2000	
Salinas	SNS	Salinas	CA	Coast Starlight	1872	1941	
Salisbury	SAL	Salisbury	NC	Carolinian Crescent Piedmont	1908	1993–1996, 1999	
Salt Lake City	SLC	Salt Lake City	UT	California Zephyr	1999	—	FrontRunner; Rocky Mountaineer; TRAX
San Antonio	SAS	San Antonio	TX	Sunset Limited Texas Eagle	1998	—	
San Bernardino	SNB	San Bernardino	CA	Southwest Chief	1971	—	Metrolink
San Clemente Pier	SNP	San Clemente	CA	Pacific Surfliner	1931	—	Metrolink
San Diego Old Town	OLT	San Diego	CA	Pacific Surfliner	1994	—	COASTER; San Diego Trolley
San Diego Santa Fe Depot	SAN	San Diego	CA	Pacific Surfliner	1971	—	COASTER; San Diego Trolley
San Jose Diridon	SJC	San Jose	CA	Capitol Corridor Coast Starlight	1935	—	Altamont Corridor Express; Caltrain; VTA light rail
San Juan Capistrano	SNC	San Juan Capistrano	CA	Pacific Surfliner	1974	—	Metrolink
San Luis Obispo	SLO	San Luis Obispo	CA	Coast Starlight Pacific Surfliner	1943	—	
San Marcos	SMC	San Marcos	TX	Texas Eagle	—	2001	
Sanderson	SND	Sanderson	TX	Sunset Limited Texas Eagle	1882	—	
Sandpoint	SPT	Sandpoint	ID	Empire Builder	—	1916	
Sandusky	SKY	Sandusky	OH	Floridian Lake Shore Limited	1892	—	
Sanford	SFA	Sanford	FL	Auto Train	1983	2010	
Santa Ana	SNA	Santa Ana	CA	Pacific Surfliner	1985	—	Metrolink
Santa Barbara	SBA	Santa Barbara	CA	Coast Starlight Pacific Surfliner	1902	2000	
Santa Clara–Great America	GAC	Santa Clara	CA	Capitol Corridor	1993	—	Altamont Corridor Express; VTA light rail
Santa Clara–Transit Center	SCC	Santa Clara	CA	Capitol Corridor	2012	—	Altamont Corridor Express; Caltrain
Saratoga Springs	SAR	Saratoga Springs	NY	Adirondack Ethan Allen Express	1959	2004	
Savannah	SAV	Savannah	GA	Palmetto Floridian Silver Meteor	1962	—	
Schenectady	SDY	Schenectady	NY	Adirondack Empire Service Ethan Allen Express Lake Shore Limited Maple Leaf	1979	2018	
Schriever	SCH	Schriever	LA	Sunset Limited	1975	—	
Seattle King Street	SEA	Seattle	WA	Amtrak Cascades Coast Starlight Empire Builder	1906	—	Sounder commuter rail Link light rail Seattle Streetcar
Sebring	SBG	Sebring	FL	Floridian Silver Meteor	1924	—	
Sedalia	SED	Sedalia	MO	Missouri River Runner	1886	—	
Selma	SSM	Selma	NC	Carolinian Palmetto	1867	—	
Shelby	SBY	Shelby	MT	Empire Builder	—	—	
Simi Valley	SIM	Simi Valley	CA	Coast Starlight Pacific Surfliner	1986	—	Metrolink
Slidell	SDL	Slidell	LA	Crescent	1913	—	
Solana Beach	SOL	Solana Beach	CA	Pacific Surfliner	1994	—	COASTER
South Bend	SOB	South Bend	IN	Floridian Lake Shore Limited	1970	—	
South Portsmouth–South Shore	SPM	South Shore	KY	Cardinal	1976	—	
Southern Pines	SOP	Southern Pines	NC	Floridian	1898	—	
Spartanburg	SPB	Spartanburg	SC	Crescent	1904	—	
Spokane	SPK	Spokane	WA	Empire Builder	1891	1994	
Springfield	SPI	Springfield	IL	Lincoln Service Texas Eagle	1895	—	
Springfield	SPG	Springfield	MA	Hartford Line Lake Shore Limited Northeast Regional Valley Flyer Vermonter	1973, 1994	2017	Hartford Line
St. Albans	SAB	St. Albans	VT	Vermonter	1972	—	
St. Catharines	SCA	St. Catherines	ON	Maple Leaf	1853	—	GO Transit
St. Cloud	SCD	St. Cloud	MN	Empire Builder	1909	—	
St. Joseph–Benton Harbor	SJM	St. Joseph	MI	Pere Marquette	1913	—	
St-Lambert	SLQ	Saint-Lambert	QC	Adirondack	2000	—	Exo commuter rail Via Rail
St. Louis Gateway	STL	St. Louis	MO	Lincoln Service Missouri River Runner Texas Eagle	2008	—	MetroLink
St. Paul-Minneapolis Union	MSP	St. Paul	MN	Borealis Empire Builder	2011	—	Metro
Stamford	STM	Stamford	CT	Acela Northeast Regional Vermonter	1849	—	Metro-North Railroad; Shore Line East
Stanley	STN	Stanley	ND	Empire Builder	—	—	
Stanwood	STW	Stanwood	WA	Amtrak Cascades	2009	—	
Staples	SPL	Staples	MN	Empire Builder	1909	—	
Staunton	STA	Staunton	VA	Cardinal	—	—	
Stockton Downtown	SKT	Stockton	CA	Gold Runner	1930	2005	Altamont Corridor Express
Stockton San Joaquin Street	SKN	Stockton	CA	Gold Runner	1900	2005	
Sturtevant	SVT	Sturtevant	WI	Borealis Hiawatha	2006	—	
Suisun–Fairfield	SUI	Suisun City	CA	Capitol Corridor	1904	1992	
Summit	SMT	Summit	IL	Lincoln Service	2014	—	Metra
Syracuse	SYR	Syracuse	NY	Empire Service Lake Shore Limited Maple Leaf	1998	2017	
Tacoma Dome	TAC	Tacoma	WA	Amtrak Cascades Coast Starlight	2021	—	Sounder commuter rail Link light rail
Tampa	TPA	Tampa	FL	Floridian	1912	1998	
Taylor	TAY	Taylor	TX	Texas Eagle	1976	—	
Temple	TPL	Temple	TX	Texas Eagle	1911	2000	
Texarkana	TXA	Texarkana	AR	Texas Eagle	1930	—	
Thurmond	THN	Thurmond	WV	Cardinal	1905	1995	
Ticonderoga	FTC	Ticonderoga	NY	Adirondack	1974	1991	
Toccoa	TCA	Toccoa	GA	Crescent	1915	—	
Toledo	TOL	Toledo	OH	Floridian Lake Shore Limited	1950	1996, 2016	
Tomah	TOH	Tomah	WI	Borealis Empire Builder	—	—	
Topeka	TOP	Topeka	KS	Southwest Chief	1950	2006	
Toronto Union	TWO	Toronto	ON	Maple Leaf	1927	—	Via Rail; GO Transit; Union Pearson Express; Toronto subway Toronto streetcar system
Trenton	TRE	Trenton	NJ	Cardinal Carolinian Crescent Keystone Service Northeast Regional Palmetto Pennsylvanian Silver Meteor Vermonter	1863	1893, 1976, 2008	NJ Transit; SEPTA Regional Rail
Trinidad	TRI	Trinidad	CO	Southwest Chief	—	—	
Troy	TRM	Troy	MI	Wolverine	2014	—	
Truckee	TRU	Truckee	CA	California Zephyr	1891	—	
Tucson	TUS	Tucson	AZ	Sunset Limited Texas Eagle	1907	2004	Sun Link
Tukwila	TUK	Tukwila	WA	Amtrak Cascades	2001	—	Sounder commuter rail
Turlock–Denair	TRK	Denair	CA	Gold Runner	1987	—	
Tuscaloosa	TCL	Tuscaloosa	AL	Crescent	1911	—	
Tyrone	TYR	Tyrone	PA	Pennsylvanian	1880	2000	
Utica	UCA	Utica	NY	Empire Service Lake Shore Limited Maple Leaf	1914	—	Adirondack Railroad
Van Nuys	VNC	Van Nuys	CA	Coast Starlight Pacific Surfliner	1982	—	Metrolink
Vancouver Pacific Central	VAC	Vancouver	BC	Amtrak Cascades	1906	—	Via Rail; Expo Line
Vancouver	VAN	Vancouver	WA	Amtrak Cascades Coast Starlight Empire Builder	1908	1988, 2008	
Ventura	VEC	Ventura	CA	Pacific Surfliner	1992	—	
Victorville	VRV	Victorville	CA	Southwest Chief	1990	—	
Wallingford	WFD	Wallingford	CT	Hartford Line Northeast Regional Valley Flyer	1871	2014–2017	Hartford Line
Walnut Ridge	WNR	Walnut Ridge	AR	Texas Eagle	1908, 1974	1995	
Warrensburg	WAR	Warrensburg	MO	Missouri River Runner	1890	—	
Wasco	WAC	Wasco	CA	Gold Runner	1975	2006	
Washington Union	WAS	Washington	DC	Acela Cardinal Carolinian Crescent Floridian Northeast Regional Palmetto Silver Meteor Vermonter	1908	1981–1989	MARC Train; Virginia Railway Express; Washington Metro
Washington	WAH	Washington	MO	Missouri River Runner	Pre-1865	1923	
Waterbury–Stowe	WAB	Waterbury	VT	Vermonter	1875	2006	
Waterloo	WTI	Waterloo	IN	Floridian Lake Shore Limited	1990	—	
Wells	WEM	Wells	ME	Downeaster	2001	—	
Wenatchee Columbia	WEN	Wenatchee	WA	Empire Builder	1981	1997	
West Glacier	WGL	West Glacier	MT	Empire Builder	1910, 1935	—	
West Palm Beach	WPB	West Palm Beach	FL	Floridian Silver Meteor	1925	1991	Tri-Rail
Westerly	WLY	Westerly	RI	Northeast Regional	1837	1872, 1912–1913	
Westport	WSP	Westport	NY	Adirondack	1876	1891, 1908, 1974–1976, 1998	
White River Junction	WRJ	White River Junction	VT	Vermonter	1937	—	
White Sulphur Springs	WSS	White Sulphur Springs	WV	Cardinal	—	—	
Whitefish	WFH	Whitefish	MT	Empire Builder	—	1928	
Whitehall	WHL	Whitehall	NY	Adirondack	1974	2017	
Williamsburg	WBG	Williamsburg	VA	Northeast Regional	1935	—	
Williston	WTN	Williston	ND	Empire Builder	1910	2010	
Wilmington	WIL	Wilmington	DE	Acela Cardinal Carolinian Crescent Northeast Regional Palmetto Silver Meteor Vermonter	1908	2011	SEPTA Regional Rail
Wilson	WLN	Wilson	NC	Carolinian Palmetto	1924	1996–1998	
Windsor	WND	Windsor	CT	Hartford Line Northeast Regional Valley Flyer	1870	1988	Hartford Line
Windsor–Mt. Ascutney	WNM	Windsor	VT	Vermonter	1901	1970s	
Windsor Locks	WNL	Windsor Locks	CT	Hartford Line Northeast Regional Valley Flyer Vermonter	1831, 1875, 1981	—	Hartford Line
Winnemucca	WNN	Winnemucca	NV	California Zephyr	1868	1993, 2012	
Winona	WIN	Winona	MN	Borealis Empire Builder	1888	—	
Winslow	WLO	Winslow	AZ	Southwest Chief	1929	—	
Winter Haven	WTH	Winter Haven	FL	Floridian Silver Meteor	1925	1947	
Winter Park Resort	WPR	Winter Park	CO	Winter Park Express	—	—	
Winter Park	WPK	Winter Park	FL	Floridian Silver Meteor	1882	1913, 1962, 2014	SunRail
Wisconsin Dells	WDL	Wisconsin Dells	WI	Borealis Empire Builder	1989	—	
Wishram	WIH	Wishram	WA	Empire Builder	1907, 1981	—	
Woburn–Anderson	WOB	Woburn	MA	Downeaster	2001	—	MBTA Commuter Rail
Wolf Point	WPT	Wolf Point	MT	Empire Builder	—	—	
Woodbridge	WDB	Woodbridge	VA	Northeast Regional	1992	—	Virginia Railway Express
Worcester	WOR	Worcester	MA	Lake Shore Limited	1911	2000	MBTA Commuter Rail
Yazoo City	YAZ	Yazoo City	MS	City of New Orleans	1995	—	
Yemassee	YEM	Yemassee	SC	Palmetto Silver Meteor	—	1955, 2010–present	
Yonkers	YNY	Yonkers	NY	Adirondack Berkshire Flyer – (seasonal) Empire Service Ethan Allen Express Maple Leaf	—	1912, 2004	Metro-North Railroad
Yuma	YUM	Yuma	AZ	Sunset Limited Texas Eagle	1877	—	

== Suspended stations ==
Station	Station code	Location	State	Route	Opened	Suspended	Notes
Atmore	ATR	Atmore	AL	Sunset Limited	1989	2005	Service has been suspended on the Sunset Limited east of New Orleans since Hurricane Katrina, however Mardi Gras Service resumed as far east as Mobile station in 2025.
Chipley	CIP	Chipley	FL	Sunset Limited	1993	2005	Service has been suspended on the Sunset Limited east of New Orleans since Hurricane Katrina, however Mardi Gras Service resumed as far east as Mobile station in 2025.
Crestview	CSV	Crestview	FL	Sunset Limited	1993	2005	Service has been suspended on the Sunset Limited east of New Orleans since Hurricane Katrina, however Mardi Gras Service resumed as far east as Mobile station in 2025.
Lake City	LEC	Lake City	FL	Sunset Limited	1993	2005	Service has been suspended on the Sunset Limited east of New Orleans since Hurricane Katrina, however Mardi Gras Service resumed as far east as Mobile station in 2025.
Madison	MDO	Madison	FL	Sunset Limited	1993	2005	Service has been suspended on the Sunset Limited east of New Orleans since Hurricane Katrina, however Mardi Gras Service resumed as far east as Mobile station in 2025.
Pensacola	PNS	Pensacola	FL	Sunset Limited	1993	2005	Service has been suspended on the Sunset Limited east of New Orleans since Hurricane Katrina, however Mardi Gras Service resumed as far east as Mobile station in 2025.
Port Kent	PRK	Port Kent	NY	Adirondack	1977	2020	Service has been suspended at this station since 2020 when the Adirondack was truncated to Albany–Rensselaer. Full service to Montreal resumed on April 3, 2023; Port Kent station remained closed as service on the Port Kent-Burlington Ferry remained suspended indefinitely.
Tallahassee	TLH	Tallahassee	FL	Sunset Limited	1993	2005	Service has been suspended on the Sunset Limited east of New Orleans since Hurricane Katrina, however Mardi Gras Service resumed as far east as Mobile station in 2025.

== Future stations ==
Station	Location	State	Route	Notes
Christiansburg	Christiansburg	VA	Northeast Regional	Construction commenced in 2025. Station scheduled to be reopened in 2027.
De Soto	De Soto	MO	Texas Eagle	Station plans announced in 2023; De Soto previously had passenger rail service until 1971.
Elk Grove	Elk Grove	CA	Gold Runner	Station to open with a new branch of the Gold Runner between Stockton and Natomas.
Geneseo	Geneseo	IL	Quad Cities	Under construction extension to the Quad Cities.
Hercules	Hercules	CA	Capitol Corridor	Proposed infill station with partial funding.
King City	King City	CA	Coast Starlight	Planned to start construction in 2028 or 2029.
Lodi	Lodi	CA	Gold Runner	Station to open with a new branch of the Gold Runner between Stockton and Natomas.
Midtown Sacramento	Sacramento	CA	Gold Runner	Station to open with a new branch of the Gold Runner between Stockton and Natomas.
Moline	Moline	IL	Quad Cities	Under construction extension to the Quad Cities.
Natomas/Sacramento Airport	Sacramento	CA	Gold Runner	Station to open with a new branch of the Gold Runner between Stockton and Natomas.
Oakley	Oakley	CA	Gold Runner	Platform to be built in 2024 for service on the Gold Runner.
Old North Sacramento	Sacramento	CA	Gold Runner	Station to open with a new branch of the Gold Runner between Stockton and Natomas.
Oxford	Oxford	OH	Cardinal	Unstaffed station under construction.
Sacramento City College	Sacramento	CA	Gold Runner	Station to open with a new branch of the Gold Runner between Stockton and Natomas.

== Amtrak Thruway stations ==
Stop	Code	Location	State	Connection
Abbotsford–Colby	ABB	Abbotsford	WI	Milwaukee
Absecon	ABN	Absecon	NJ	Philadelphia–30th Street
Alanson	ALA	Alanson	MI	Kalamazoo
Albany International Airport	ABA	Albany	NY	Albany
Allentown	AWN	Allentown	PA	Philadelphia–30th Street
Alma	AAM	Alma	MI	Battle Creek; Kalamazoo
Almont	ANT	Almont	CO	Denver
Alpena	ALM	Alpena	MI	Kalamazoo
Andes	AND	Andes	NY	
Appleton	APP	Appleton	WI	Milwaukee
Arcata	ARC	Arcata	CA	Martinez
Arcata–Cal Poly Humboldt	HSU	Arcata	CA	Martinez
Arkville	AKV	Arkville	NY	
Ashland	AHL	Ashland	OR	Klamath Falls
Astoria	ART	Astoria	OR	Portland (PDX)
Atascadero	ATA	Atascadero	CA	San Jose Diridon; Santa Barbara
Atco	ATO	Atco	NJ	Philadelphia–30th Street
Atlantic City	ACY	Atlantic City	NJ	Philadelphia–30th Street
Auburn	AUR	Auburn	ME	Portland (POR)
Augusta	AGM	Augusta	ME	Portland (POR)
Avon	AVO	Avon	NY	
Baker City	BAK	Baker City	OR	Portland (PDX)
Bangor	BAN	Bangor	ME	Portland (POR)
Banks	BKS	Banks	OR	
Baraboo	BRB	Baraboo	WI	
Barstow–Bus Stop	BBS	Barstow	CA	Bakersfield; Oxnard
Bath	BAH	Bath	NY	
Baton Rouge	BTR	Baton Rouge	LA	New Orleans
Bay City	BCY	Bay City	MI	Kalamazoo
Beaver Dam	BVD	Beaver Dam	WI	Columbus
Beaver Marsh	BVM	Beaver Marsh	OR	
Beaverton	BVT	Beaverton	OR	Portland (PDX)
Belfast	BFT	Belfast	ME	Portland (POR)
Bend	BND	Bend	OR	Chemult; Eugene–Springfield
Bennington–Downtown	BNI	Bennington	VT	
Bennington–North	BNN	Bennington	VT	
Berlin	BIN	Berlin	NH	Boston South
Berlin–Ocean Pines	OCP	Ocean Pines	MD	BWI Thurgood Marshall Airport
Big Rapids	BGP	Big Rapids	MI	Kalamazoo
Big Run	BIR	Big Run	PA	Pittsburgh
Biloxi	BIG	Biloxi	MS	Jackson (JAN)
Blacksburg	BLK	Blacksburg	VA	Roanoke
Blairsville	BLS	Blairsville	PA	Pittsburgh
Boise	BOI	Boise	ID	Salt Lake City
Bonduel	BDU	Bonduel	WI	
Bradenton	BDT	Bradenton	FL	Orlando
Brandon	BDN	Brandon	VT	
Brewster	BWW	Brewster	WA	Wenatchee
Bristol	BRI	Bristol	RI	
Brookings	BKO	Brookings	OR	Klamath Falls
Brothers	BHS	Brothers	OR	
Bryan	BRY	Bryan	TX	Fort Worth
Buchanan	BCH	Buchanan	OR	
Buellton	BUL	Buellton	CA	San Jose Diridon; Santa Barbara
Buena Vista	BUV	Buena Vista	CO	Denver
Buffalo	BFW	Buffalo	WY	Denver
Burbank Airport- South	BUR	Burbank	CA	Bakersfield
Burbank–Downtown	BBK	Burbank	CA	
Burlington–Downtown Transit Center	BLT	Burlington	VT	
Burns	BNS	Burns	OR	Eugene–Springfield
Cabazon-Morongo Casino	CBZ	Cabazon	CA	Bakersfield; Fullerton
Cadillac	CLC	Cadillac	MI	Kalamazoo
Cambridge	CDE	Cambridge	MD	BWI Thurgood Marshall Airport
Camden–Rockport	CDN	Rockport	ME	Portland (POR)
Cameron Park	CPC	Cameron Park	CA	Sacramento
Camp Verde	CVD	Camp Verde	AZ	Flagstaff
Cannon Beach	CBO	Cannon Beach	OR	Portland (PDX)
Canton–State University of New York	CTS	Canton	NY	
Canton–Downtown	CTO	Canton	NY	
Carmel	CRM	Carmel	CA	Salinas
Casper	CAS	Casper	WY	Denver
Cave Junction	CVJ	Cave Junction	OR	Klamath Falls
Cedar Springs	CDS	Cedar Springs	MI	Kalamazoo
Charlevoix	CHL	Charlevoix	MI	Kalamazoo
Cheboygan	CHB	Cheboygan	MI	Kalamazoo
Cherry Hill	CRH	Cherry Hill	NJ	Philadelphia–30th Street
Chestertown	CTT	Chestertown	NY	
Chewelah	CWL	Chewelah	WA	Spokane
Cheyenne	CHD	Cheyenne	WY	Denver
Chiloquin	CHN	Chiloquin	OR	
Chippewa Falls	CHP	Chippewa Falls	WI	Milwaukee
Clare	CLR	Clare	MI	Kalamazoo
Claremont	CLM	Claremont	CA	Bakersfield; San Bernardino
Clarksville	CRK	Clarksville	TN	
Clatskanie	CTK	Clatskanie	OR	
Clearfield	CFD	Clearfield	PA	Pittsburgh
Cloverdale	CLV	Cloverdale	CA	
Coarsegold	CGD	Coarsegold	CA	Fresno
Colchester	CVT	Colchester	VT	
Colfax	CFX	Colfax	WA	Spokane
Colorado Springs	COS	Colorado Springs	CO	Denver; Raton
Columbus	COL	Columbus	OH	Pittsburgh; Indianapolis
Colville	CVL	Colville	WA	Spokane
Concord	CNH	Concord	NH	Boston South
Conway	CAY	Conway	NH	Boston South
Cooperstown	CPT	Cooperstown	NY	
Coos Bay	CBY	Coos Bay	OR	Eugene–Springfield
Corning	CNY	Corning	NY	
Cortland–State University of New York	CNS	Cortland	NY	
Cortland–Downtown	CRD	Cortland	NY	
Corvallis–Oregon State University	CVO	Corvallis	OR	
Corvallis–Downtown Transit Center	CVI	Corvallis	OR	
Crater Lake	CLK	Crater Lake	OR	Klamath Falls
Crescent	CSO	Crescent	OR	
Crescent City	CRC	Crescent City	CA	Klamath Falls
Crested Butte	CBC	Crested Butte	CO	Denver
Cumberland–Allegany College of Maryland	CUA	Cumberland	MD	BWI Thurgood Marshall Airport
Dade City	DDE	Dade City	FL	Jacksonville; Lakeland
Dallas–Greyhound Station	DAG	Dallas	TX	Meridian
Damariscotta	DAM	Damariscotta	ME	Portland (POR)
Dansville	DNV	Dansville	NY	
Danville	DVI	Danville	IL	Indianapolis
Davenport	DVP	Davenport	IA	Indianapolis
Dayton–Trotwood	DAT	Trotwood	OH	Pittsburgh; Indianapolis
Daytona Beach	DYA	Daytona Beach	FL	DeLand
De Kalb Junction	DKJ	De Kalb Junction	NY	
Deer Park	DPK	Deer Park	WA	Spokane
Delhi	DHI	Delhi	NY	
Delmont	DLT	Delmont	PA	Pittsburgh
Discovery Bay	DBY	Discovery Bay	WA	Seattle
Douglas	DGS	Douglas	WY	Denver
Drewsey	DRW	Drewsey	OR	
Dryden	DRY	Dryden	NY	
Du Bois	DBI	DuBois	PA	Pittsburgh
Dublin–Pleasanton	DBP	Pleasanton	CA	San Jose
Duluth–University of Minnesota	DUU	Duluth	MN	St. Paul Union Station
Duluth Transportation Center	DUL	Duluth	MN	St. Paul Union Station
Dunkirk	DUK	Dunkirk	NY	Buffalo–Exchange Street
East Troy	ETY	East Troy	WI	
Easton	ESN	Easton	MD	BWI Thurgood Marshall Airport
Eau Claire	EUC	Eau Claire	WI	Milwaukee
Ebensburg	EBN	Ebensburg	PA	Harrisburg
Egg Harbor City	EGH	Egg Harbor City	NJ	Philadelphia–30th Street
El Paso–Greyhound Station	ELB	El Paso	TX	Albuquerque
El Portal	EPL	El Portal	CA	Merced
El Segundo	ESG	El Segundo	CA	Bakersfield
Elk Grove	EKG	Elk Grove	CA	Redding; Stockton
Elmira	EMA	Elmira	NY	
Elsie	ELS	Elsie	OR	Portland (PDX)
Escanaba	EMI	Escanaba	MI	Milwaukee
Eugene–University of Oregon	EUO	Eugene	OR	
Eugene–Springfield–LTD Bus Station	EUB	Springfield	OR	
Eureka	EKA	Eureka	CA	Martinez
Evans Mills	EVM	Evans Mills	NY	
Evanston	EVY	Evanston	WY	Denver
Evansville	EVN	Evansville	IN	
Fairplay	FRP	Fairplay	CO	Denver
Falmouth–Falmouth Country Club	FAL	Falmouth	ME	Portland (POR)
Fillmore	FIL	Fillmore	CA	Bakersfield; Oxnard; Santa Barbara
Fish Camp	FSH	Fish Camp	CA	Fresno
Flagstaff–Greyhound Station	FGG	Flagstaff	AZ	Flagstaff
Fleischmanns	FLM	Fleischmanns	NY	
Florence–Grocery Outlet	GOF	Florence	OR	
Florence–Three Rivers Casino	TRF	Florence	OR	
Florence–Washburne State Park	FSP	Florence	OR	
Fond du Lac	FDL	Fond du Lac	WI	Milwaukee
Fort Cavazos	FHD	Fort Cavazos	TX	Temple
Fort Collins	FCC	Fort Collins	CO	Denver; Salt Lake City
Fort Myers	FTM	Fort Myers	FL	Orlando
Fortuna	FTA	Fortuna	CA	Martinez
Foxwoods Casino	FOX	Stonington	CT	New London
Frederick–Frederick Municipal Airport	FRR	Frederick	MD	BWI Thurgood Marshall Airport
Frederick–MARC Station	FRC	Frederick	MD	BWI Thurgood Marshall Airport
Fredonia	FDN	Fredonia	NY	Buffalo–Exchange Street
Fremont–Caltrans Park–and–Ride Lot	FRT	Fremont	CA	
Frostburg	FSB	Frostburg	MD	BWI Thurgood Marshall Airport
Greenville	GRN	Greenville	NC	Wilson
Gainesville	GNF	Gainesville	FL	Jacksonville; Lakeland
Galveston	GLS	Galveston	TX	Longview
Garberville	GBV	Garberville	CA	Martinez
Gary	GRY	Gary	IN	Chicago Union Station
Gasquet	GSQ	Gasquet	CA	
Gaylord	GYL	Gaylord	MI	Kalamazoo
Gearhart–Northbound	GHN	Gearhart	OR	
Gearhart–Southbound	GHT	Gearhart	OR	Portland (PDX)
Geneseo	GEN	Geneseo	NY	
Gilchrist	GIL	Gilchrist	OR	
Gilroy	GLY	Gilroy	CA	Salinas; San Jose
Glens Falls	GFS	Glens Falls	NY	
Goldsboro	GBO	Goldsboro	NC	Wilson
Gouverneur	GVR	Gouverneur	NY	
Government Camp	GOV	Government Camp	OR	Portland (PDX)
Grand Canyon Village–Grand Canyon Railway Depot	GCN	Grand Canyon Village	AZ	Flagstaff
Grand Canyon Village–Maswik Lodge	GCB	Grand Canyon	AZ	Flagstaff
Grand Ronde–Community Center	GRC	Grand Ronde	OR	
Grand Ronde–Spirit Mountain Casino	GRM	Grand Ronde	OR	
Grangeville	GVI	Grangeville	ID	Spokane
Grants Pass	GTP	Grants Pass	OR	Klamath Falls
Grantsville	GTV	Grantsville	MD	BWI Thurgood Marshall Airport
Grayling	GYG	Grayling	MI	Kalamazoo
Greeley	GRE	Greeley	CO	Denver
Green Bay–De Pere Park & Ride	DPE	De Pere	WI	
Green Bay–Transportation Center	GBY	Green Bay	WI	Milwaukee
Greensburg–Westmoreland Transit Center	GNG	Greensburg	PA	Harrisburg
Gresham	GRH	Gresham	OR	
Gunnison	GUN	Gunnison	CO	Denver
Hagerstown	HAG	Hagerstown	MD	BWI Thurgood Marshall Airport
Hammonton	HTN	Hammonton	NJ	Philadelphia–30th Street
Hampton	HPO	Hampton	OR	
Hancock	HKM	Hancock	MI	Milwaukee
Hancock	HNK	Hancock	MD	BWI Thurgood Marshall Airport
Harper	HRP	Harper	OR	
Hartwick Seminary	HWK	Hartwick Seminary	NY	
Havelock	HVL	Havelock	NC	Wilson
Healdsburg	HEA	Healdsburg	CA	Martinez
Hemet–East	HMT	Hemet	CA	
Hemet–West	HET	Hemet	CA	Bakersfield
Herkimer	HKI	Herkimer	NY	
Highmount	HGM	Highmount	NY	
Hillsboro	HLB	Hillsboro	OR	
Hiouchi	HIO	Crescent City	CA	
Hogansburg	HGS	Hogansburg	NY	
Hood River	HOO	Hood River	OR	Portland (PDX)
Hornell	HRN	Hornell	NY	
Houghton	HGH	Houghton	MI	Milwaukee
Houghton Lake	HGL	Houghton Lake	MI	Kalamazoo
Houston–Greyhound Terminal	HOG	Houston	TX	
Howard City	HWC	Howard City	MI	Kalamazoo
Indiana	INA	Indiana	PA	Pittsburgh
Indio	IDO	Indio	CA	Bakersfield; Fullerton
Ithaca	ITH	Ithaca	NY	
Jacksonville	JNC	Jacksonville	NC	Wilson
Jamestown	JMN	Jamestown	NY	Buffalo–Exchange Street
Janesville	JVL	Janesville	WI	Chicago Union Station
Johnson Creek	JOC	Johnson Creek	WI	
June Lake	JNL	June Lake	CA	Merced
Juntura	JTR	Juntura	OR	
Keene	KEN	Keene	NY	
Keene Valley	KVL	Keene Valley	NY	
Kent Island–Grasonville	KNT	Kent Island	MD	BWI Thurgood Marshall Airport
Kettle Falls	KTF	Kettle Falls	WA	Spokane
Killeen	KIL	Killeen	TX	Temple
Killington	KLT	Killington	VT	
King City	KGC	King City	CA	San Jose Diridon; Santa Barbara
Kingsley	KGS	Kingsley	MI	Kalamazoo
Kingston–Eastbound	KGE	Kingston	WA	
Kingston–Westbound	KGW	Kingston	WA	
Kinross Charter Township	KNS	Kinross Charter Township	MI	
Kinston	KNC	Kinston	NC	Wilson
Knappa	KNP	Knappa	OR	
L'Anse	LAN	L'Anse	MI	Milwaukee
La Crescenta	LCA	La Crescenta	CA	Bakersfield; San Bernardino
La Crosse–University of Wisconsin	LSW	La Crosse	WI	
La Grande	LAE	La Grande	OR	Portland (PDX)
La Pine	LPN	La Pine	OR	Chemult
La Quinta	LQT	La Quinta	CA	Bakersfield; Fullerton
Lake George	LGG	Lake George	NY	
Lake Placid–Olympic Center Visitors Bureau	LPA	Lake Placid	NY	
Lancaster	LCS	Lancaster	CA	Bakersfield; Victorville
Laramie	LRY	Laramie	WY	Denver
Las Cruces	LCR	Las Cruces	NM	Albuquerque
Las Vegas–Harry Reid International Airport	LAS	Las Vegas	NV	Kingman
Las Vegas–Downtown	LVS	Las Vegas	NV	Bakersfield; Kingman; Salt Lake City
Las Vegas–South Strip Transfer Terminal	LVT	Las Vegas	NV	Bakersfield; Kingman
Lathrop–Manteca	LTM	Lathrop	CA	San Jose
Latrobe–Arnold Palmer Regional Airport	LTB	Latrobe	PA	Harrisburg
Laughlin	LNV	Laughlin	NV	Kingman
Laytonville	LTV	Laytonville	CA	Martinez
Leavenworth–Bus Stop	LEV	Leavenworth	WA	
Lee Vining	LVN	Lee Vining	CA	Merced
Leggett	LEG	Leggett	CA	Martinez
Lemoore–Chamber of Commerce	LMC	Lemoore	CA	Hanford
Lewisburg	LSB	Lewisburg	PA	Harrisburg
Lewiston	LWN	Lewiston	ID	Spokane
Lewistown–Laskaris Restaurant	LWB	Lewistown	PA	Harrisburg
Lincoln	LNN	Lincoln	NH	Boston South
Lincoln City	LCO	Lincoln City	OR	
Lincolnville	LCV	Lincolnville	ME	Portland (POR)
Lindenwold	LDW	Lindenwold	NJ	Philadelphia–30th Street
Littlerock	LTR	Littlerock	CA	Bakersfield; Victorville
Littleton	LTL	Littleton	NH	Boston South
Livermore Transit Center	LIV	Livermore	CA	San Jose
Liverpool–North	LVP	Liverpool	PA	Harrisburg
Liverpool–South	LVR	Liverpool	PA	Harrisburg
Lompoc–Visitor Center	LOM	Lompoc	CA	San Jose Diridon; Santa Barbara
Long Beach	LBC	Long Beach	CA	Los Angeles Union Station
Loon Lake	LLK	Loon Lake	WA	Spokane
Los Alamos–Central Area	LOS	Los Alamos	NM	Lamy
Los Alamos–White Rock Area	LOH	Los Alamos	NM	Lamy
Louisville	LVL	Louisville	KY	Chicago Union Station
Mackinaw City	MAK	Mackinaw City	MI	Kalamazoo
Madison–University of Wisconsin	MSN	Madison	WI	Chicago Union Station
Madison–Dutch Mill Park–N–Ride	SMD	Madison	WI	Chicago Union Station
Madisonville	MDV	Madisonville	KY	Chicago Union Station
Madras	MAD	Madras	OR	
Malone	MLO	Malone	NY	
Mammoth Lakes	MMK	Mammoth Lakes	CA	Merced
Manchester	MHT	Manchester	NH	Boston South
Manchester Center– Bonnet Street	MCV	Manchester Center	VT	
Manitowoc	MTC	Manitowoc	WI	Milwaukee
Manton	MTO	Manton	MI	Kalamazoo
Mapleton	MPL	Mapleton	OR	
Margaretville	MGV	Margaretville	NY	
Marinette	MWI	Marinette	WI	Milwaukee
Marion	MAI	Marion	IL	St. Louis
Mariposa–Midtown YARTS Bus Stop	MRM	Mariposa	CA	Merced
Mariposa–Park & Ride Lot	MRP	Mariposa	CA	Merced
Marquette	MQT	Marquette	MI	Milwaukee
Marysville	MRV	Marysville	CA	Redding; Stockton
Massena	MNY	Massena	NY	
McCall	MCA	McCall	ID	Spokane
Medford–Rogue Valley Int'l Airport	MFA	Medford	OR	
Medford–Greyhound Station	MFR	Medford	OR	Klamath Falls
Menomonie–University of Wisconsin	MNM	Menomonie	WI	Milwaukee
Meridale	MDL	Meridale	NY	
Michigan City	MCI	Michigan City	IN	
Middlebury–Middlebury College	MIY	Middlebury	VT	
Midpines	MDP	Midpines	CA	Merced
Mifflintown	MIF	Mifflintown	PA	Harrisburg
Milton	MLT	Milton	WI	Milwaukee
Milwaukee–General Mitchell Airport Terminal Bus	MKB	Milwaukee	WI	Milwaukee
Mobile	MOG	Mobile	AL	Jackson (JAN)
Mohawk	MWK	Mohawk	NY	
Mojave	MOJ	Mojave	CA	Bakersfield; Victorville
Moline	MLI	Moline	IL	Indianapolis
Monarch Mountain	MOH	Salida	CO	Denver
Monroe–Eastbound	MEE	Monroe	WA	
Monroe–Westbound	MEW	Monroe	WA	
Monroeville	MNR	Monroeville	PA	Pittsburgh
Monterey–Monterey Bay Aquarium	MYA	Monterey	CA	Salinas
Monterey–Chevron Gas Station	MYT	Monterey	CA	Salinas
Monterey–Hyatt Regency Hotel	MYH	Monterey	CA	Salinas
Monterey–Marriott Hotel	MYM	Monterey	CA	Salinas
Monterey–Transit Plaza	MRY	Monterey	CA	Salinas
Montgomery	MGM	Montgomery	AL	New Orleans
Morehead City	MHD	Morehead City	NC	Wilson
Moreno Valley	MOV	Moreno Valley	CA	Bakersfield
Morgan Hill	MHC	Morgan Hill	CA	Salinas; San Jose
Morley	MOR	Morley	MI	Kalamazoo
Moscow	MOC	Moscow	ID	Spokane
Moses Lake	MLK	Moses Lake	WA	Seattle; Spokane
Mt. Morris	MMR	Mt. Morris	NY	
Mt. Pleasant	MPT	Mount Pleasant	MI	Kalamazoo
Mt. Vernon	MVI	Mt. Vernon	IL	St. Louis
Muskego	MKO	Muskego	WI	Milwaukee
Nacogdoches	NCG	Nacogdoches	TX	Longview
Nampa	NAM	Nampa	ID	Portland (PDX)
Napa	NAP	Napa	CA	Martinez
Nashua	NSH	Nashua	NH	Boston South
Nashville	NVL	Nashville	TN	Chicago Union Station
New Bern	NBR	New Bern	NC	Wilson
New Buffalo	NFF	New Buffalo	PA	Harrisburg
Santa Clarita–Newhall	NHL	Santa Clarita	CA	Bakersfield; Los Angeles Union
Newport	NPO	Newport	OR	
Newport	NWP	Newport	RI	
North Conway	NCW	North Conway	NH	Boston South
North Plains	NPL	North Plains	OR	
Northridge	NRG	Los Angeles	CA	
O'Brien	OBR	O'Brien	OR	
Oakhurst	OAH	Oakhurst	CA	Fresno
Oakridge	OKR	Oakridge	OR	
Ocala	OCA	Ocala	FL	Jacksonville; Lakeland
Ocean City	OCM	Ocean City	MD	BWI Thurgood Marshall Airport
Oconto	OCO	Oconto	WI	Milwaukee
Ogden	OGD	Ogden	UT	Salt Lake City
Okanogan	OGW	Okanogan	WA	Wenatchee
Omak	OMW	Omak	WA	
Oneonta	ONO	Oneonta	NY	
Ontario	ONT	Ontario	OR	Portland (PDX)
Orono	ORO	Orono	ME	Portland (POR)
Oroville	ORV	Oroville	CA	Redding; Stockton
Oshkosh–University of Wisconsin	OSU	Oshkosh	WI	Milwaukee
Otis	OTE/OTW	Otis	OR	
Owosso	OWO	Owosso	MI	Kalamazoo
Paducah	PAD	Paducah	KY	Chicago Union Station
Palm Desert	PDC	Palm Desert	CA	Bakersfield; Fullerton
Palm Springs–Palm Springs Airport	PSP	Palm Springs	CA	Fullerton
Palm Springs–Spa Resort Casino	PSS	Palm Springs	CA	Bakersfield; Fullerton
Palmdale	PMD	Palmdale	CA	Bakersfield; Victorville
Pasadena	PAS	Pasadena	CA	Bakersfield; San Bernardino
Pateros	PTE	Pateros	WA	Wenatchee
Paul Smiths	PSI	Paul Smiths	NY	
Pellston	PST	Pellston	MI	Kalamazoo
Pendleton	PEN	Pendleton	OR	Portland (PDX)
Pennsauken	PNK	Pennsauken	NJ	Philadelphia–30th Street
Peoria–Bradley University	PIU	Peoria	IL	Bloomington–Normal; Indianapolis
Peoria–CityLink Transit Center	PIA	Peoria	IL	Bloomington–Normal; Indianapolis
Perris	PRI	Perris	CA	
Petaluma	PTC	Petaluma	CA	Martinez
Petoskey	PSK	Petoskey	MI	Kalamazoo
Philipsburg	PLP	Philipsburg	PA	Pittsburgh
Phoenix–Sky Harbor Airport	PHA	Phoenix	AZ	Flagstaff; Maricopa
Phoenix–Greyhound Station	PHG	Phoenix	AZ	Flagstaff
Phoenix–Phoenix North Station	PXN	Phoenix	AZ	Flagstaff; Maricopa
Pine Junction	PJT	Pine	CO	Denver
Pittsburgh–Bus Station	PGB	Pittsburgh	PA	Harrisburg
Placerville	PCV	Placerville	CA	Sacramento
Pleasanton	PLS	Pleasanton	CA	San Jose
Plymouth	PMO	Plymouth	NH	Boston South
Port Angeles	PTA	Port Angeles	WA	Wenatchee
Port Charlotte	PCH	Port Charlotte	FL	Orlando
Port Townsend	PTO	Kingston	WA	Seattle
Port Treverton	PRE	Port Trevorton	PA	Harrisburg
Portland–Portland International Airport	PDA	Portland	OR	
Portsmouth	PTS	Portsmouth	NH	Boston South
Potsdam–Downtown	PTD	Potsdam	NY	
Pottersville	PTV	Pottersville	NY	
Pottstown	PWN	Pottstown	PA	Philadelphia–30th Street
Prairie View	PVW	Prairie View	TX	Fort Worth
Providence–Seastreak Ferry Terminal	PVF	Providence	RI	
Prunedale	PDL	Prunedale	CA	Salinas; San Jose
Pueblo	PUB	Pueblo	CO	Denver; Raton
Pulaski	PLK	Pulaski	NY	
Pullman	PUL	Pullman	WA	Spokane
Punxsutawney	PUN	Punxsutawney	PA	Pittsburgh
Quakertown	QKR	Quakertown	PA	Philadelphia–30th Street
Quincy	QUC	Quincy	WA	Seattle; Spokane
Rainier	RNR	Rainier	OR	
Rawlins	RWY	Rawlins	WY	Denver
Reading	RDI	Reading	PA	Philadelphia–30th Street
Red Bluff	RBF	Red Bluff	CA	Redding; Stockton
Redding–Downtown RABA Transit Center	RDR	Redding	CA	Sacramento
Redmond	RDM	Redmond	OR	Chemult
Redmond–Transit Hub	RDT	Redmond	OR	
Reed City	REE	Reed City	MI	Kalamazoo
Reedsport	RPT	Reedsport	OR	Eugene–Springfield
Richfield Springs	RFS	Richfield Springs	NY	
Richmond	RBC	Richmond	BC	Seattle King Street; Vancouver Pacific Central Station
Rickreall	RRL	Rickreall	OR	
Riley	RIL	Riley	OR	
Ritzville	RTZ	Ritzville	WA	Seattle; Spokane
Rochester	RMN	Rochester	MN	St. Paul Union Station
Rochester–Bus Terminal	ROB	Rochester	NY	
Rock Island	RKI	Rock Island	IL	Indianapolis
Rock Springs	RSY	Rock Springs	WY	Denver
Rockford	RCK	Rockford	IL	Chicago Union Station
Rockford	RKF	Rockford	MI	Kalamazoo
Rockland–Maine State Ferry Terminal	ROD	Rockland	ME	Portland (POR)
Rohnert Park	RPC	Rohnert Park	CA	Martinez
Running Y Ranch	RNY	Klamath Falls	OR	
Rutland–MVRTD Transit Center	RTC	Rutland	VT	
Sacramento–State Capitol	SCS	Sacramento	CA	Sacramento
Saginaw	SGW	Saginaw	MI	Kalamazoo
Salem–Bus Stop	SLE	Salem	OR	
Salida	SLD	Salida	CO	Denver
Salinas Intermodal Transportation Center	SNR	Salinas	CA	San Jose Diridon; Santa Barbara
Salisbury–BayRunner Shuttle Office	SLS	Salisbury	MD	BWI Thurgood Marshall Airport
Salt Lake City–Intermodal Trans. Hub	SLB	Salt Lake City	UT	Salt Lake City
San Francisco–Chase Bank	SFC	San Francisco	CA	Emeryville
San Luis Obispo–Cal Poly	SLP	San Luis Obispo	CA	San Jose Diridon; Santa Barbara
San Pedro–Catalina Terminal	SPD	San Pedro	CA	Los Angeles Union
San Pedro–Public Library	SPO	San Pedro	CA	Los Angeles Union
Seaside–Sand City	SES	Seaside	CA	Salinas; San Jose
Sandy	SAY	Sandy	OR	Portland (PDX)
Santa Barbara–UCSB	SBU	Santa Barbara	CA	San Jose Diridon; Santa Barbara
Santa Cruz	SCZ	Santa Cruz	CA	San Jose
Santa Fe–Four Seasons Area	SAE	Santa Fe	NM	Lamy
Santa Fe–Central Area	SAF	Santa Fe	NM	Lamy
Santa Maria	SAT	Santa Maria	CA	San Jose Diridon; Santa Barbara
Santa Monica–Santa Monica Pier	SMN	Santa Monica	CA	Downtown Santa Monica Metro
Santa Paula	SAP	Santa Paula	CA	Bakersfield; Oxnard; Santa Barbara
Santa Rosa	SRC	Santa Rosa	CA	Martinez
Saranac Lake	SAK	Saranac Lake	NY	
Sarasota	SRA	Sarasota	FL	Orlando
Sault Sainte Marie	SMI	Sault Ste. Marie	MI	Kalamazoo
Scappoose	SPP	Scappoose	OR	
Schroon Lake	SNL	Schroon Lake	NY	
Scotts Valley	SVY	Scotts Valley	CA	San Jose
Scranton	SRN	Scranton	PA	Philadelphia–30th Street
Seabrook	SBK	Seabrook	NH	Boston South
Searsport	SRT	Searsport	ME	Portland (POR)
Seaside–Seaside Cinema	SSD	Seaside	OR	Portland (PDX)
Seaside–Seaside Lodge & Intl Hostel	SSH	Seaside	OR	Portland (PDX)
Seattle–Clipper Vacations Ferry Terminal	SVF	Seattle	WA	
Sedona	SDC	Sedona	AZ	Flagstaff
Selinsgrove	SSG	Selinsgrove	PA	Harrisburg
Selma	SOR	Selma	OR	
Sequim	SQM	Sequim	WA	Seattle
Shamokin Dam	SKD	Shamokin Dam	PA	Harrisburg
Shawano	SHW	Shawano	WI	Milwaukee
Sheboygan	SHB	Sheboygan	WI	Milwaukee
Shreveport–SporTran Intermodal Terminal	SHR	Shreveport	LA	Longview
Sisters	STO	Sisters	OR	Eugene–Springfield
Skykomish–Eastbound	SKE	Skykomish	WA	
Skykomish–Westbound	SKW	Skykomish	WA	
Smith River	SMR	Smith River	CA	Klamath Falls
Solvang	SLV	Solvang	CA	San Jose Diridon; Santa Barbara
South Beloit	BET	South Beloit	IL	Chicago Union Station
South Burlington–Burlington International Airport	BTV	South Burlington	VT	
South Lake Tahoe	SLT	South Lake Tahoe	CA	Sacramento
Sparks	SPX	Sparks	NV	Sacramento
Sparta	SPA	Sparta	WI	Milwaukee
Spokane–Spokane Airport	GEG	Spokane	WA	
St. George	STG	St. George	UT	Salt Lake City
St. Helens	SHE	St. Helens	OR	
St. Ignace	STI	St. Ignace	MI	Kalamazoo
St. Paul–Minneapolis–MSP Intl. Airport	MSL	St. Paul	MN	St. Paul Union Station
St. Petersburg–Clearwater	STP	St. Petersburg	FL	Orlando
Stanley	SNY	Stanley	WI	Milwaukee
Stanwood	SWD	Stanwood	MI	Kalamazoo
State College	STC	State College	PA	Harrisburg; Pittsburgh
Stateline	SLH	Stateline	CA	Sacramento
Stevens Pass	SSW	Stevens Pass	WA	Seattle; Spokane
Stevens Point–Sky Harbor International Airport	SVU	Stevens Point	WI	Milwaukee
Stevens Point–Olympia Family Restaurant	SVP	Stevens Point	WI	Milwaukee
Sun City–Menifee	SUT	Sun City	CA	Bakersfield
Sunbury	SUR	Sunbury	PA	Harrisburg
Sunriver	SUN	Sunriver	OR	Chemult
Svensen	SVE	Svensen	OR	
Swansboro	SWB	Swansboro	NC	Wilson
Sykesville	SYK	Sykesville	PA	Pittsburgh
Syracuse–Syracuse Hancock Airport	SYA	Syracuse	NY	
Tacoma–Greyhound Station	TAB	Tacoma	WA	
Tawas City	TWC	Tawas City	MI	Kalamazoo
Tehachapi	TEH	Tehachapi	CA	Bakersfield; Victorville
Tempe	TEM	Tempe	AZ	Flagstaff; Maricopa
The Dalles	THD	The Dalles	OR	Portland (PDX)
The Villages–Lady Lake	TVF	The Villages	FL	Jacksonville; Lakeland
Tillamook–Park & Ride	TPR	Tillamook	OR	
Tillamook–Transit Visitor Center	TTC	Tillamook	OR	
Tilton	TLT	Tilton	NH	Boston South
Toledo	TDO	Toledo	OR	
Torrance	TOA	Torrance	CA	Bakersfield
Tracy–ACE Station	TRC	Tracy	CA	San Jose
Tracy–Wendy's Restaurant	TRA	Tracy	CA	San Jose
Traverse City	TRV	Traverse City	MI	Kalamazoo
Trout Run	TRR	Trout Run	PA	
Tualatin	TUA	Tualatin	OR	
Tusayan–Grand Canyon Village	TSY	Tusayan	AZ	Flagstaff
Twin Falls	TFI	Twin Falls	ID	Salt Lake City
Tyler	TYL	Tyler	TX	Meridian
Ukiah	UKH	Ukiah	CA	Martinez
Vale	VAE	Vale	OR	Eugene–Springfield
Vallejo–Six Flags Discovery Kingdom	VMW	Vallejo	CA	Martinez
Vallejo–Curtola Park & Ride	VAL	Vallejo	CA	Martinez
Livermore–Vasco Road ACE Station	VAS	Livermore	CA	San Jose
Veneta	VTA	Veneta	OR	
Vicksburg	VKS	Vicksburg	MS	Jackson (JAN)
Victoria–Capital City Station	VBC	Victoria	BC	Vancouver
Victoria–Clipper Vacations Ferry Terminal	VIF	Victoria	BC	Vancouver
Vienna	VNA	Vienna	IL	
Virginia Beach	VAB	Virginia Beach	VA	
Visalia	VIS	Visalia	CA	Hanford
Waco	WCX	Waco	TX	Fort Worth
Waldo	WDO	Waldo	FL	Jacksonville; Lakeland
Waldoboro	WDR	Waldoboro	ME	Portland (POR)
Walla Walla	WWA	Walla Walla	WA	Pasco
Wallingford	WAG	Wallingford	VT	
Warm Springs	WMS	Warm Springs	OR	Portland (PDX)
Warrensburg	WRB	Warrensburg	NY	
Warrenton	WNT	Warrenton	OR	Portland (PDX)
Watertown	WRT	Watertown	NY	
Waupaca	WAU	Waupaca	WI	Milwaukee
Waupun	WPN	Waupun	WI	Columbus
Wausau–Rothschild–Lamers Connect Bus Station	WSU	Rothschild	WI	Milwaukee
Wausau–Transit Center	WSJ	Wausau	WI	Milwaukee
Welches	WLC	Welches	OR	Portland (PDX)
Wellington	WEL	Wellington	KS	Newton; Oklahoma City
Wenatchee–Link Transit Columbia Station	WEC	Wenatchee	WA	
Westchester	WCH	Westchester	CA	Bakersfield
Westfield	WSF	Westfield	WI	Portage
Westfir	WFR	Westfir	OR	
Westport	WPO	Westport	OR	
Westwood–UCLA	WES	Los Angeles	CA	Bakersfield Amtrak
Wheatland	WHT	Wheatland	WY	Denver
White Haven	WHV	White Haven	PA	Philadelphia–30th Street
Whitewater	WWT	Whitewater	WI	Milwaukee
Wichita	WIC	Wichita	KS	Newton; Oklahoma City
Wildwood	WWD	Wildwood	FL	Jacksonville; Lakeland
Wilkes–Barre	WKB	Wilkes-Barre	PA	Philadelphia–30th Street
Williams–Grand Canyon Railway Depot	WMA	Williams	AZ	Flagstaff
Williams–Holiday Inn Express	WMH	Williams	AZ	Flagstaff
Williamsport	WLM	Williamsport	PA	Harrisburg
Willits	WTS	Willits	CA	Martinez
Wilmington	WMN	Wilmington	NC	
Winston-Salem State University	UWS	Winston-Salem	NC	High Point
Winston–Salem–Clark Campbell Trans. Ctr.	WNS	Winston-Salem	NC	High Point
Winter Park–Ski Resort Shuttle Bus Stop	WPS	Winter Park	CO	Fraser–Winter Park
Wiscasset	WST	Wiscasset	ME	Portland (POR)
Wittenberg	WIT	Wittenberg	WI	Milwaukee
Woodburn	WBN	Woodburn	OR	Portland (PDX)
Yachats	YCH	Yachats	OR	
Yosemite National Park–Visitor Center	YOV	Yosemite National Park	CA	Fresno; Merced
Yosemite National Park–Crane Flat	YOF	Yosemite National Park	CA	Merced
Yosemite National Park–Curry Village	YOC	Yosemite National Park	CA	Merced
Yosemite National Park–Mariposa Grove	YOM	Yosemite National Park	CA	Merced
Yosemite National Park–Tuolomne Meadows	YOT	Yosemite National Park	CA	Merced
Yosemite National Park–Wawona	YOH	Yosemite National Park	CA	Merced
Yosemite National Park–White Wolf Lodge	YOW	Yosemite National Park	CA	Merced
Yosemite National Park–Yosemite Valley Lodge	YOS	Yosemite National Park	CA	Merced

== See also ==
- List of busiest Amtrak stations
- List of Amtrak stations in California
- List of IATA-indexed train stations
- List of major cities in U.S. lacking Amtrak service
- List of Greyhound Bus stations
- List of closed Amtrak stations

== Bibliography ==
- Orzoco, Michael Anthony (2012). Images of America: Alhambra. Mount Pleasant, South Carolina: Arcadia Publishing. ISBN 9780738576077.
- Sanders, Craig (2006). Amtrak in the Heartland. Bloomington, Indiana: Indiana University Press. ISBN 9780253027931.
