= Mount Meredith (New York) =

Mountain in New York, United States

- Location within New York Location within the United States

Highest point
- Elevation: 2,346 feet (715 m)
- Coordinates: 42°21′16″N 74°56′38″W

Geography
- Location: Meridale, New York, U.S.
- Topo map: USGS Delhi

Mount Meredith is a mountain located in the Catskill Mountains of New York southeast of Meridale. Rattail Ridge is located east of Mount Meredith.
