= McCook station =

Railway station in McCook, Nebraska, US

McCook, NE
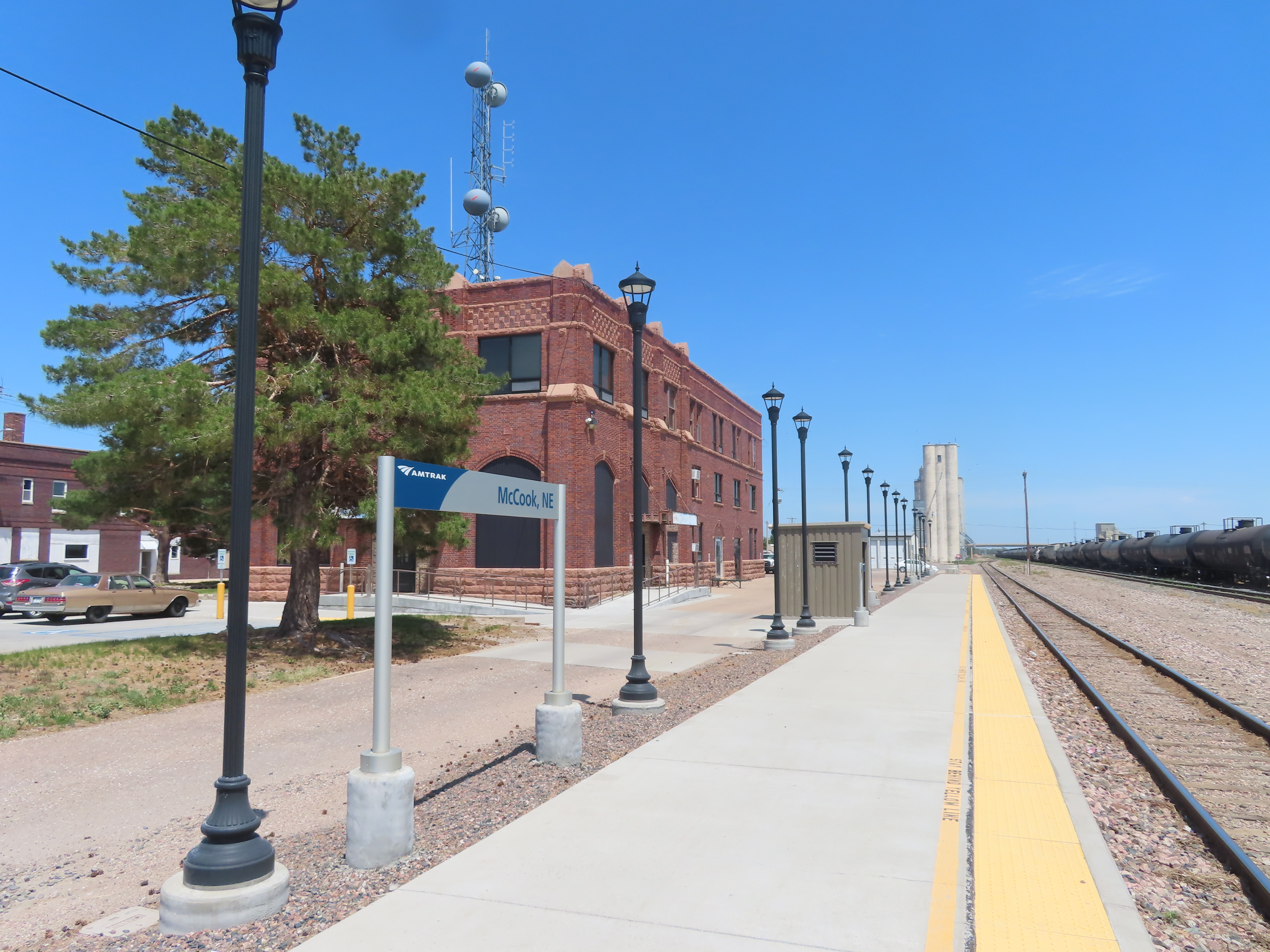
- McCook station in June 2022

General information
- Location: 101 Norris Avenue; McCook, Nebraska; United States
- Coordinates: 40.1975°N 100.6256°W
- Line: BNSF Akron Subdivision / Hastings Subdivision
- Platforms: 1 side platform
- Tracks: 1

Other information
- Station code: Amtrak: MCK

History
- Opened: 1882
- Rebuilt: April 1925 – April 13, 1926

Passengers
- FY 2025: 3,264 (Amtrak)

Services
Preceding station	Amtrak	Following station
Fort Morgan toward Emeryville	California Zephyr	Holdrege toward Chicago
Former services
Preceding station	Amtrak	Following station
Fort Morgan toward Los Angeles	Desert Wind Discontinued in 1997	Holdrege toward Chicago
Fort Morgan toward Seattle	Pioneer Discontinued in 1997	Holdrege toward Chicago
Preceding station	Burlington Route	Following station
Culbertson toward Denver	Main Line	Indianola toward Chicago
Denver toward Oakland	California Zephyr	Hastings toward Chicago
Location

McCook station is an Amtrak intercity train station in McCook, Nebraska, served by the California Zephyr. The depot opened on April 13, 1926, by the Chicago, Burlington and Quincy Railroad to replace an earlier structure from 1882. The brown brick depot features Tudor Revival detailing as seen in the pointed arch windows and the buttresses that divide the facades into regular bays.
