= Fort Morgan station =

Fort Morgan, CO
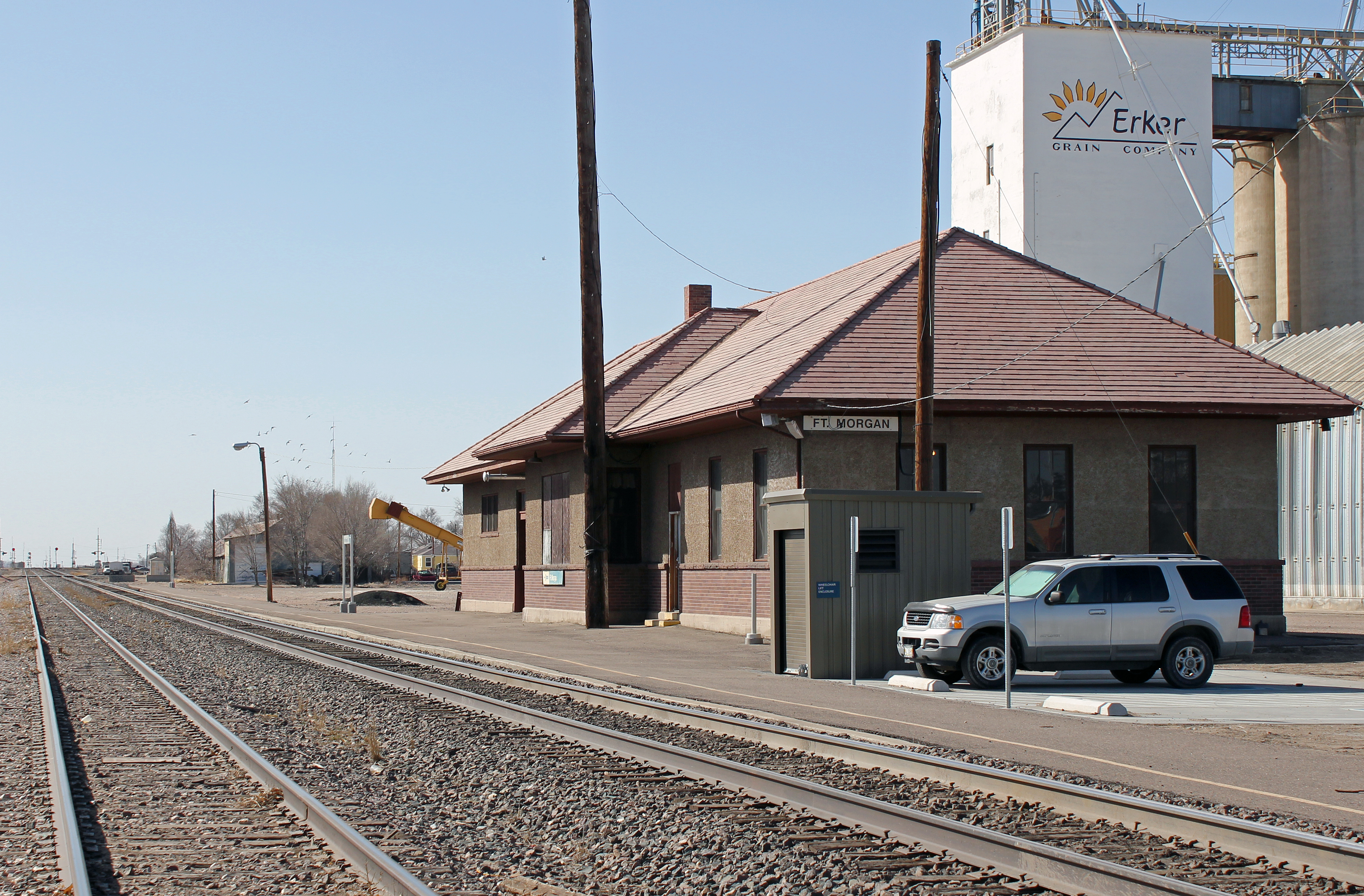
- The Amtrak station in Fort Morgan.

General information
- Location: South Ensign and Main Streets; Fort Morgan, Colorado
- Coordinates: 40.2470°N 103.8029°W
- Line: BNSF Brush Subdivision
- Platforms: 1 side platform
- Tracks: 2

Other information
- Station code: Amtrak: FMG

Passengers
- FY 2025: 3,623 (Amtrak)

Services
Preceding station	Amtrak	Following station
Denver toward Emeryville	California Zephyr	McCook toward Chicago
Former services
Preceding station	Amtrak	Following station
Denver toward Emeryville	California Zephyr	Akron closed 1987 toward Chicago
Denver toward Los Angeles	Desert Wind Discontinued in 1997	McCook toward Chicago
Denver toward Los Angeles	Desert Wind Discontinued in 1997	Akron closed 1987 toward Chicago
Denver toward Seattle	Pioneer Discontinued in 1997	McCook toward Chicago
Denver toward Seattle	Pioneer Discontinued in 1997	Akron closed 1987 toward Chicago
Preceding station	Burlington Route	Following station
Wiggins toward Denver	Main Line	Brush toward Chicago
Location

Fort Morgan station is an Amtrak intercity train station in Fort Morgan, Colorado. It is served once daily by the California Zephyr, which runs eastbound to Omaha and Chicago and westbound to Denver, Salt Lake City, Reno, and the San Francisco Bay Area with intermediate stops. The depot was originally built by the Chicago, Burlington and Quincy Railroad in 1922.
