= Hastings station (Nebraska) =

Train station in Hastings, Nebraska, US

Hastings, NE
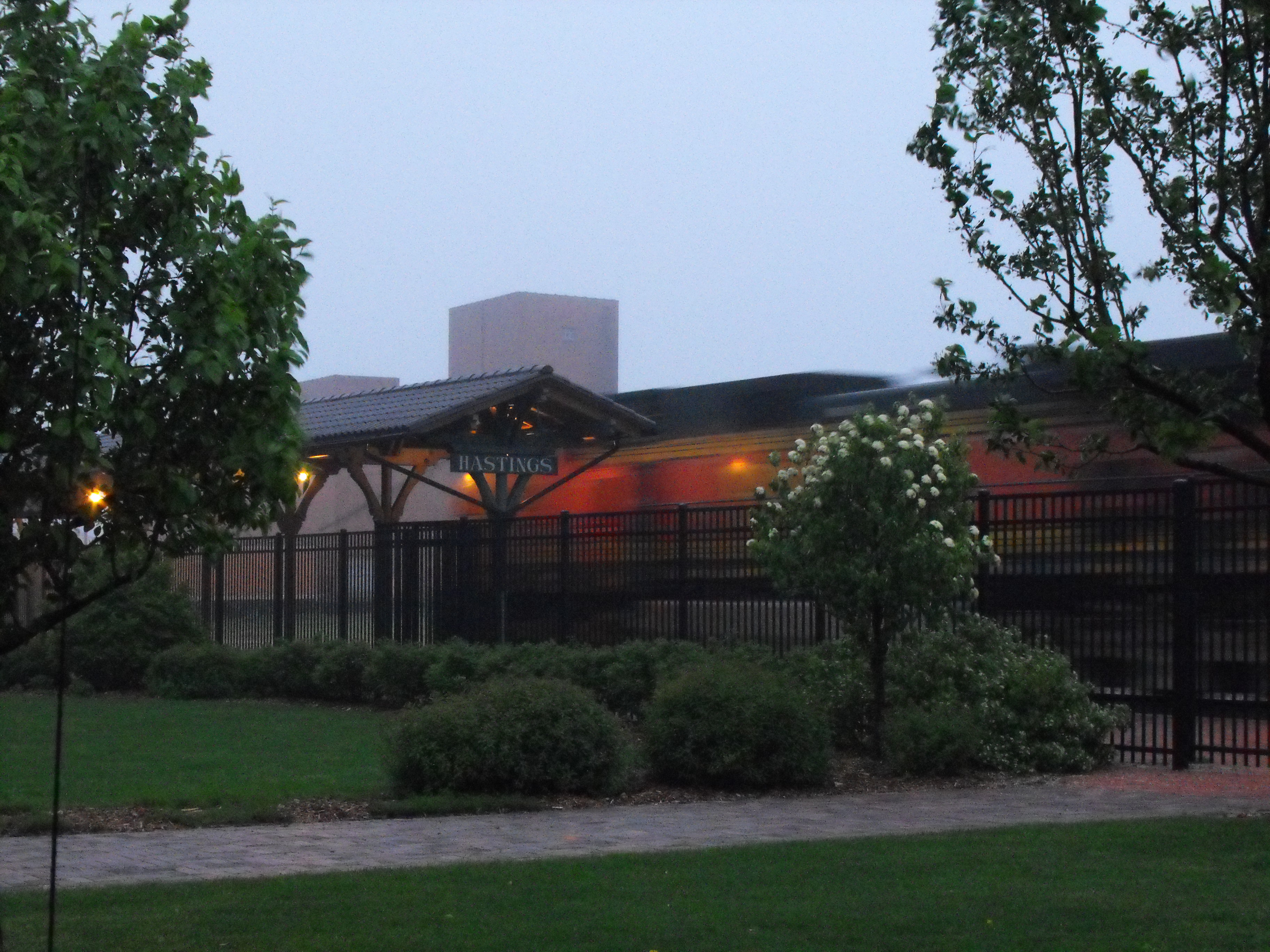
- A BNSF train passing through the station in 2008

General information
- Location: 501 West First Street; Hastings, Nebraska; United States
- Coordinates: 40°35′2.76″N 98°23′15″W
- Owner: Midland LLC, BNSF Railway
- Line: BNSF Hastings Subdivision
- Platforms: 1 side platform
- Tracks: 1

Construction
- Parking: Yes
- Accessible: Yes

Other information
- Station code: Amtrak: HAS

History
- Opened: October 1902
- Rebuilt: 1966, 2000

Passengers
- FY 2025: 4,089 (Amtrak)

Services
Preceding station	Amtrak	Following station
Holdrege toward Emeryville	California Zephyr	Lincoln toward Chicago
Former services
Preceding station	Amtrak	Following station
Holdrege closed 2020 toward Emeryville	California Zephyr	Lincoln toward Chicago
Holdrege toward Los Angeles	Desert Wind Discontinued in 1997	Lincoln toward Chicago
Holdrege toward Seattle	Pioneer Discontinued in 1997	Lincoln toward Chicago
Preceding station	Burlington Route	Following station
Ingleside toward Denver	Main Line	Inland toward Chicago
McCook toward Oakland	California Zephyr	Lincoln toward Chicago
Juniata toward Kearner	Kearney – Aurora	Trumbull toward Aurora, NE
Ayr Junction toward Alma	Alma – Hastings	Terminus
Brickton toward Red Cloud	Red Cloud – Hastings	Terminus
- Burlington Station
- U.S. National Register of Historic Places
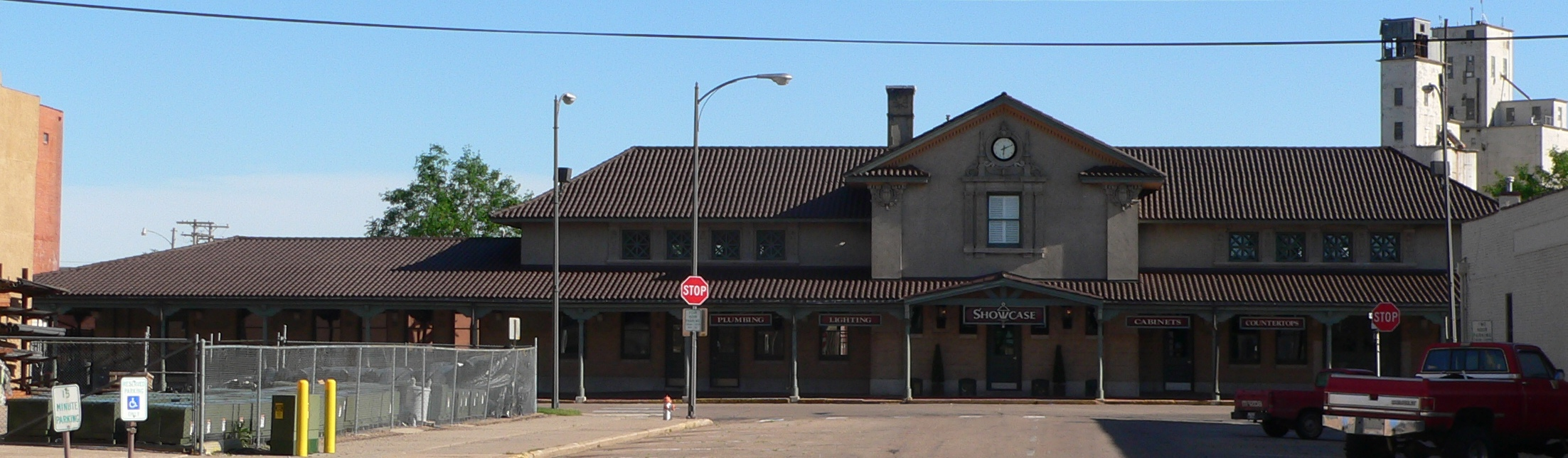
- Frontage of the Burlington Route depot in Hastings.
- Area: 1 acre (0.40 ha)
- Built: 1898
- Architect: Thomas Rogers Kimball; Graham, Anderson, Probst & White
- Architectural style: Spanish Colonial Revival
- NRHP reference No.: 78001693
- Added to NRHP: March 29, 1978
Location

Hastings station is an Amtrak intercity train station in Hastings, Nebraska. It is served daily by the California Zephyr.

The station was built as Hastings Burlington Station in 1902. Thomas Rogers Kimball designed it in the Spanish Colonial Revival style for the Burlington Railroad. It was renovated in 1966 and 2000 and was placed on the National Register of Historic Places in 1978. Part of the building is leased to commercial tenants.

Amtrak spent $10 million to upgrade both Hastings station and the station at Holdrege. At Hastings, Amtrak installed an 860-foot (260 m) platform, bringing it into compliance with the Americans with Disabilities Act of 1990. At the cost of $4.7 million, Amtrak also renovated the waiting area in the 1902 depot. Both stations attained LED lighting, wheelchair lifts and new signage.
