= Burlington Railroad Depot =

- Nebraska City Burlington Depot
- U.S. National Register of Historic Places
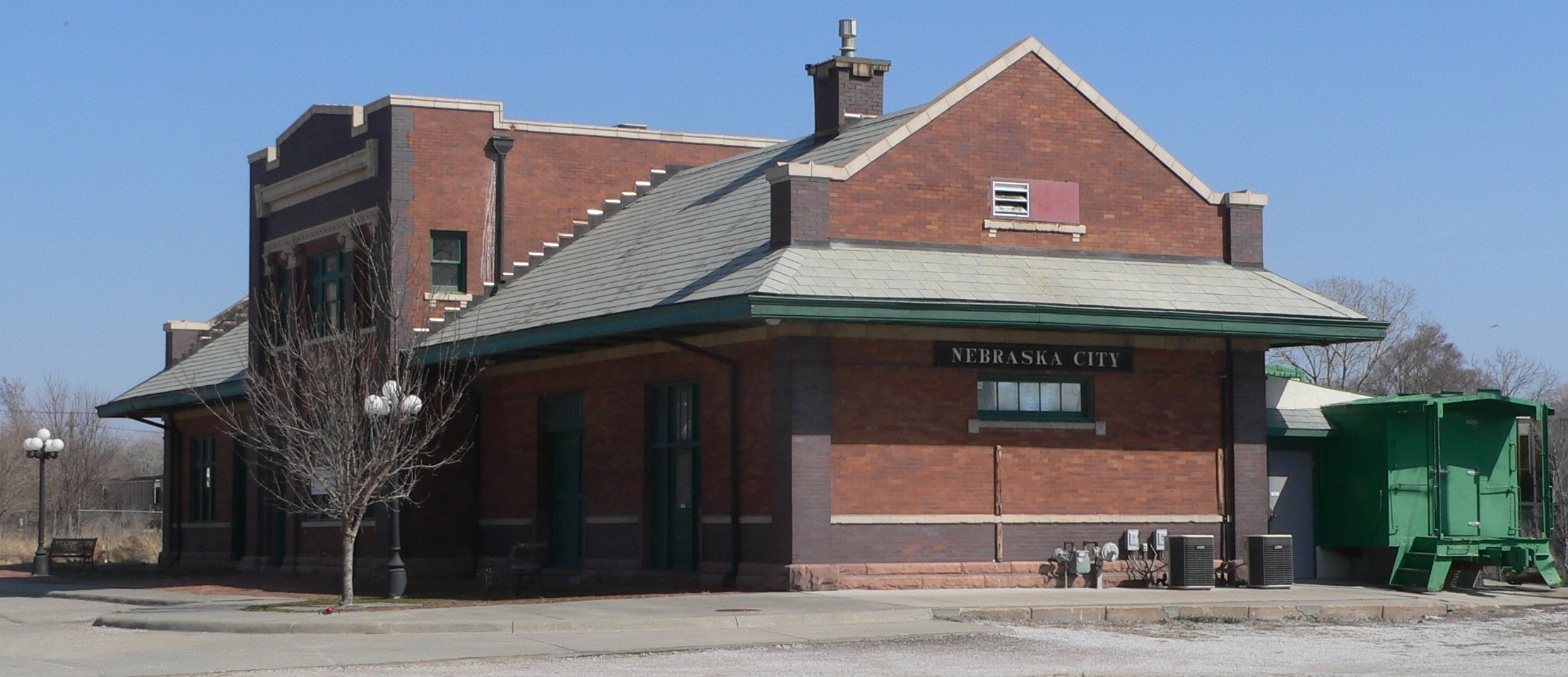

- Location within Nebraska Location within the United States
- Location: Jct. of 6th and Corso Sts., Nebraska City, Nebraska, USA
- Coordinates: 40°40′13″N 95°51′09″W
- Built: 1912
- Architectural style: Renaissance Revival
- NRHP reference No.: 97000881
- Added to NRHP: August 8, 1997

The Burlington Railroad Depot in Nebraska City, also known as the Nebraska City Burlington Depot, and Nebraska City station is a historic train station listed on the National Register of Historic Places.

The station dates to 1912 when it was built in Renaissance Revival style after a prior station proved insufficient for the city's passenger needs.

The museum is slated to form part of the future Nebraska Railroad Museum, whose leaders plan to display a historic railcar in front of the building.

== See also ==
- National Register of Historic Places listings in Otoe County, Nebraska

Preceding station	Burlington Route	Following station
Minersville toward Holdrege	Holdrege – Nebraska City	Terminus
Dunbar toward Lincoln	Lincoln – Nebraska City	Terminus
