= Holdrege station =

Amtrak train station in Holdrege, Nebraska, US

Holdrege, NE
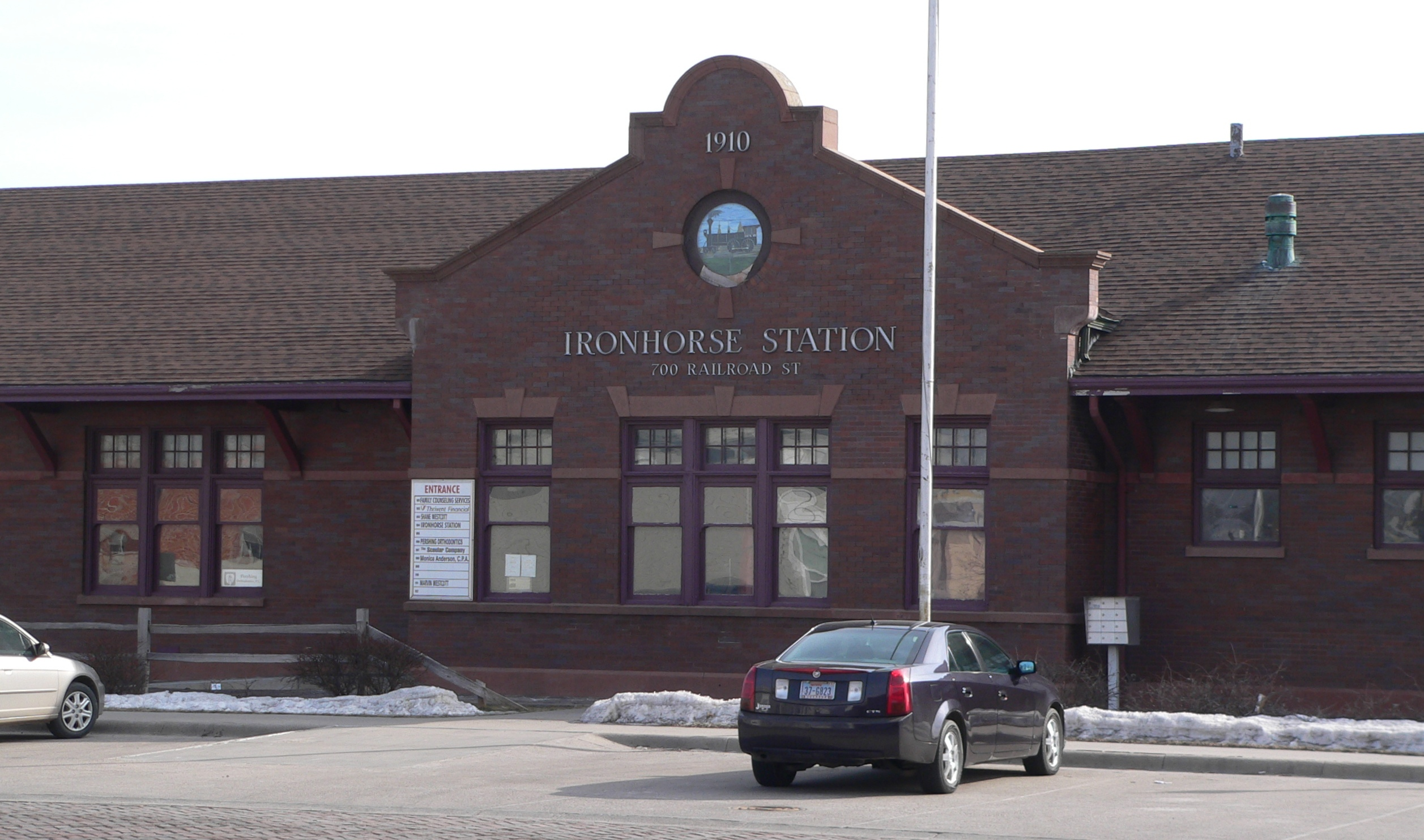

General information
- Location: 200 East Avenue; Holdrege, Nebraska; United States
- Coordinates: 40°26′9″N 99°22′14″W
- Owner: The Warehouse, LLC
- Line: BNSF Hastings Subdivision
- Platforms: 1 island platform
- Tracks: 2

Construction
- Parking: Yes
- Accessible: Yes

Other information
- Station code: Amtrak: HLD

History
- Opened: 1910
- Rebuilt: September 1910 – February 1911; July–October 2020

Passengers
- FY 2025: 1,761 (Amtrak)

Services
Preceding station	Amtrak	Following station
McCook toward Emeryville	California Zephyr	Hastings toward Chicago
Former services
Preceding station	Amtrak	Following station
McCook toward Emeryville	California Zephyr July to October 2020	Hastings toward Chicago
McCook toward Los Angeles	Desert Wind Discontinued in 1997	Hastings toward Chicago
McCook toward Seattle	Pioneer Discontinued in 1997	Hastings toward Chicago
Preceding station	Burlington Route	Following station
Atlanta toward Denver	Main Line	Funk toward Chicago
Loomis toward Sterling	Sterling – Holdrege	Terminus
Terminus	Holdrege – Nebraska City	Wilcox toward Nebraska City
- C B & Q Holdrege Depot
- U.S. National Register of Historic Places
- Location: 700 Railroad Street, Holdrege, Nebraska
- Architect: CB&Q Railroad
- Architectural style: Mission/Spanish Revival, Colonial Revival
- NRHP reference No.: 97000131
- Added to NRHP: February 21, 1997
Location

Holdrege station is an Amtrak intercity train station in Holdrege, Nebraska, served by the California Zephyr. It was originally opened in February 1911 by the Chicago, Burlington and Quincy Railroad as the CB&Q Holdrege Depot, and the depot has been listed on the National Register of Historic Places since February 21, 1997. However, the depot is no longer part of the station facilities.

Passenger service to the station ended in July 2020, owing to Americans with Disabilities Act concerns not being addressed by the building's owner. Amtrak constructed a new platform 63 yards (58 m) to the east and resumed service that October. The new station area was planned to be expanded in 2021.

Amtrak upgraded the stations at Holdrege and Hastings in 2024. At Holdrege, the railroad installed a new heated shelter, new signage, LED lighting, wheelchair lifts with an enclosure.
