= Lincoln station (Nebraska) =

Train station in Lincoln, Nebraska, U.S.

Lincoln, Nebraska
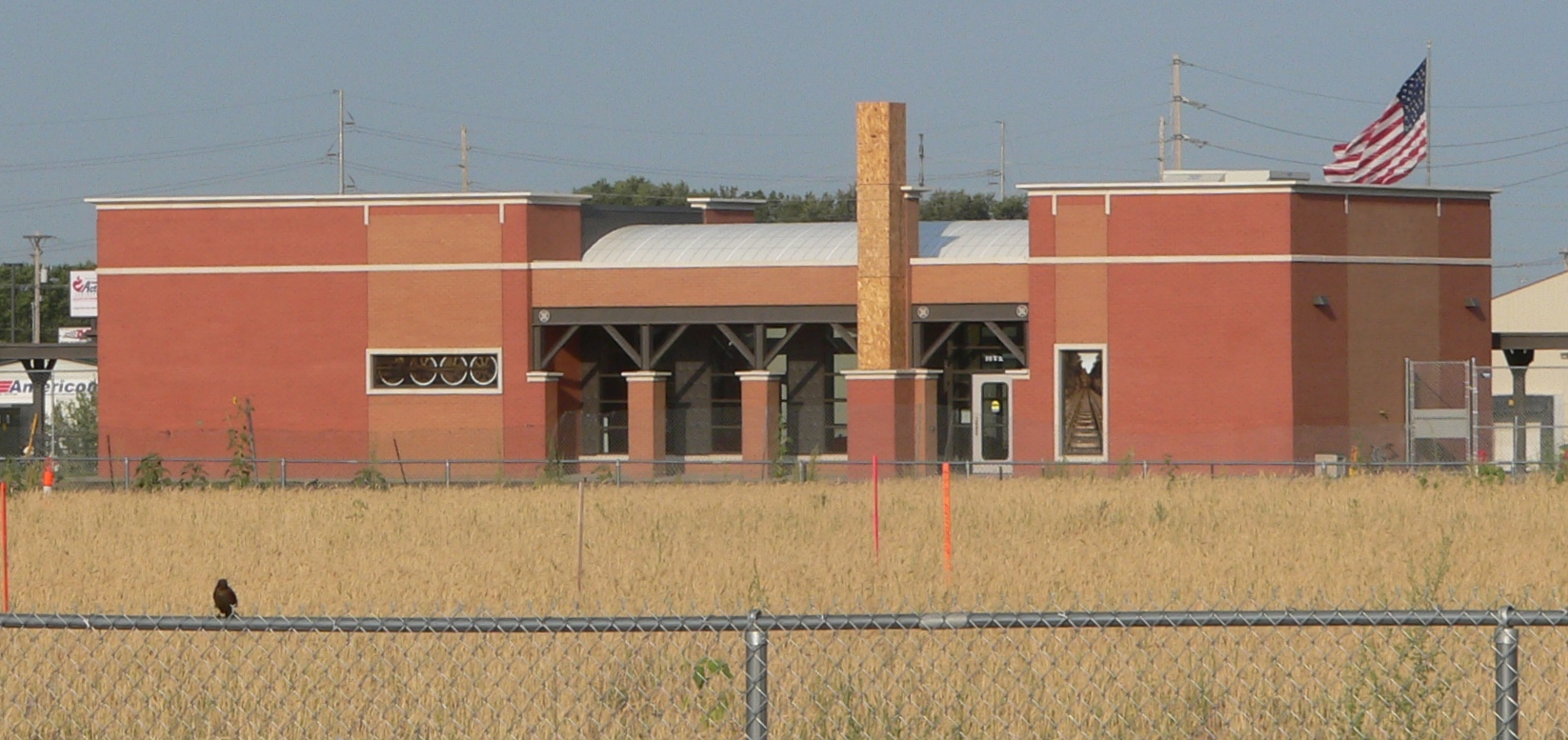
- Lincoln Amtrak station, seen from the northeast. The tracks are behind (west of) the building.

General information
- Location: 277 Pinnacle Arena Drive (formerly 510 N Street); Lincoln, Nebraska; United States
- Coordinates: 40°48′57″N 96°42′50″W
- Platforms: 1 side platform
- Tracks: 5

Construction
- Accessible: Yes

Other information
- Station code: Amtrak: LNK

History
- Opened: June 26, 2012

Passengers
- FY 2025: 11,799 (Amtrak)

Services
Preceding station	Amtrak	Following station
Hastings toward Emeryville	California Zephyr	Omaha toward Chicago
Location

Lincoln station (also known as Haymarket station to distinguish it from the previous station) is an Amtrak intercity train station in Lincoln, Nebraska, served daily by the California Zephyr. The station opened on June 26, 2012, replacing a station originally built in 1927 by the Chicago, Burlington and Quincy Railroad. The station is 2,750 square feet (255 m^{2}), with an 800-foot (240 m) platform, and cost $1.5 million. The previous station was abandoned because the construction of the Pinnacle Bank Arena required the re-routing of railway lines away from it. Designed by Sinclair Hille Architects, the building is composed of brick pavilions linked by a central waiting room.

== History ==
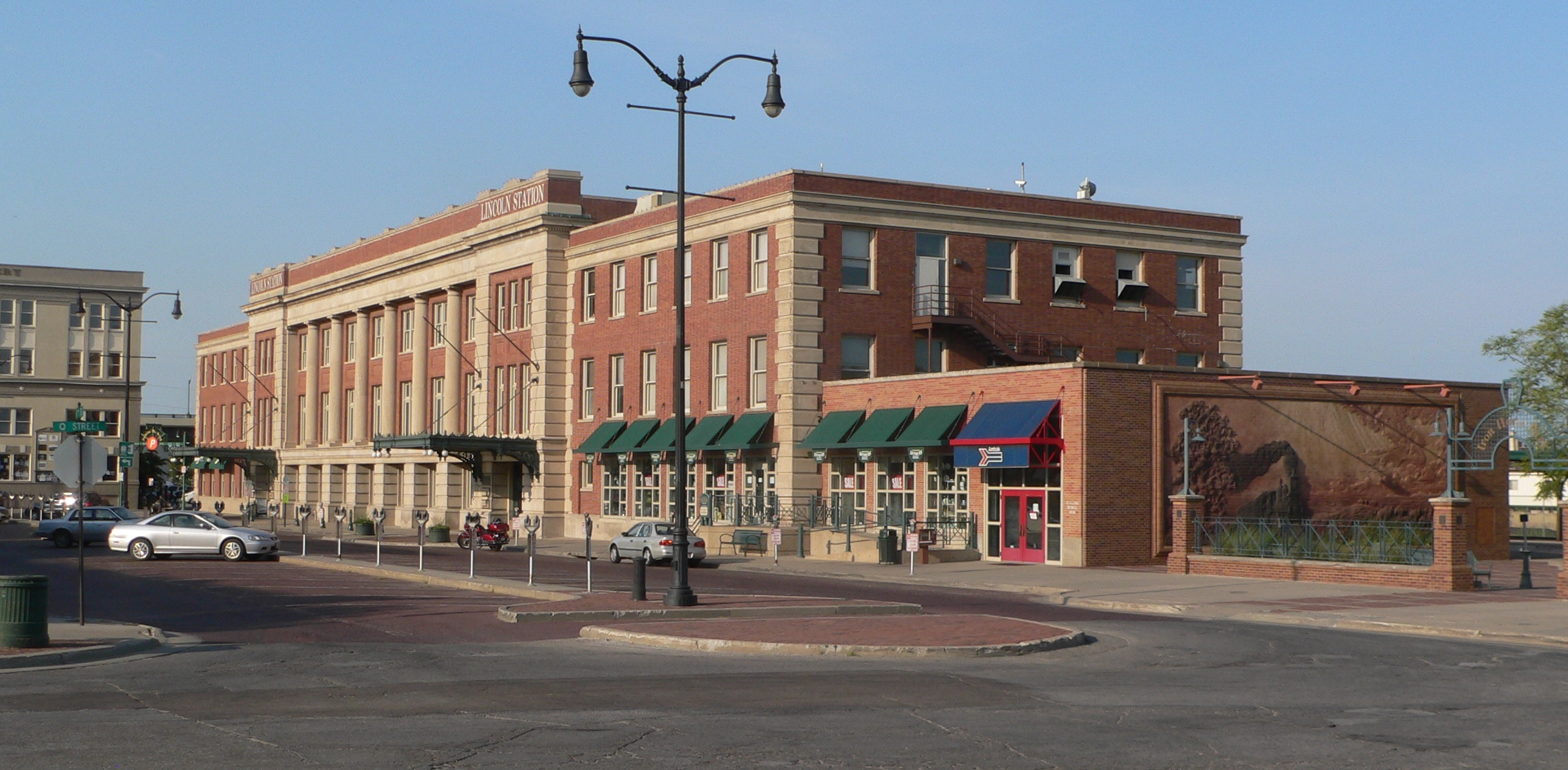
The former Lincoln Station in 2012

=== Previous station ===
The previous Lincoln Station was announced in 1926 and was built for Burlington Railroad. The station was built on the site of the former Lincoln Station, which was demolished later that year to make way for the current building. It was originally known as Burlington Station Lincoln. The contract was awarded to Peter Kiewit Sons Omaha and construction would cost an estimated $900,000. Construction began in early 1927 and Lincoln Station officially opened in October 1927.

From 1989 to 1990, the station underwent renovations and had its named changed from Burlington Station Lincoln, to Lincoln Station. Lincoln Station continued its usage as a train depot until 2012, when it was de-commissioned and replaced with a smaller train station located 500 feet West.

=== Current station ===
In 2010, following the announcement of the Haymarket Arena, it was announced that the scrap yard and several rail lines would need to be removed to make way for construction. Additionally, this would require a new station to be built further West of the original. The station was designed by Sinclair Hille Architects. Plans for the 2,750 square foot (255 m^{2}) station were officially approved in January 2011 and the estimated cost would be $1.5 million. Lincoln Station officially opened in 2012.
