= Meridale, New York =

- Hamlet
- Location within New York Location within the United States
- Coordinates: 42°22′01″N 74°57′14″W
- Country: United States
- State: New York
- County: Delaware
- Elevation: 1,778 ft (542 m)
- Time zone: UTC-5 (Eastern (EST))
  - Summer (DST): UTC-4 (EDT)
- ZIP code: 13806
- Area code: 607
- GNIS feature ID: 956982

Meridale is a hamlet in Delaware County, New York, United States. The community is located along New York State Route 28, 6.5 miles (10.5 km) north-northwest of Delhi. Meridale has a post office with ZIP code 13806, which opened on May 4, 1876.
