= Transportation in Texas =

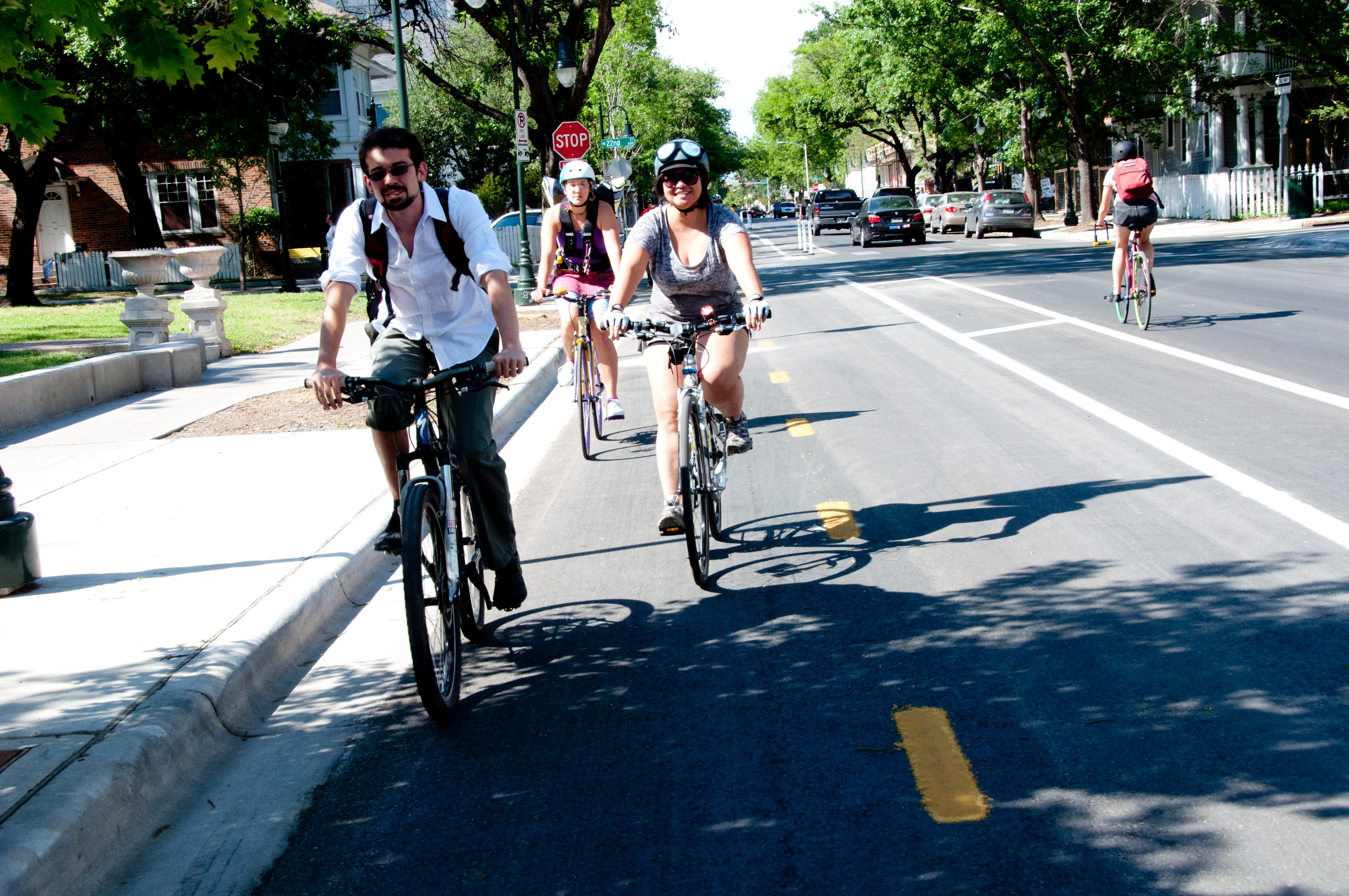
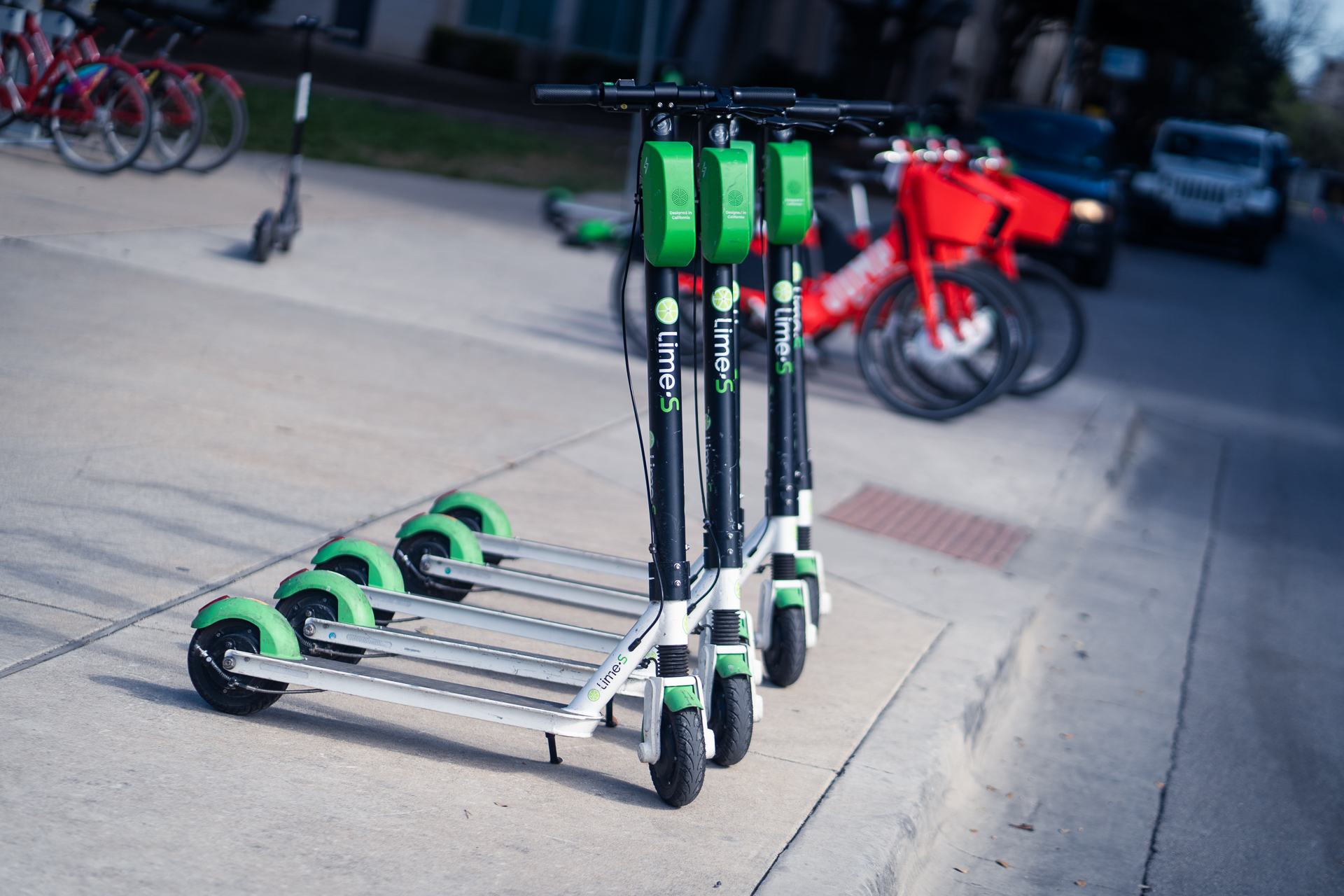
Transportation in Texas
Cycle track, Austin, Lime scooters, Austin

The Texas Department of Transportation (TxDOT) is a governmental agency and its purpose is to "provide safe, effective, and efficient movement of people and goods" throughout the state. Though the public face of the agency is generally associated with maintenance of the state's immense highway system, the agency is also responsible for aviation in the state and overseeing public transportation systems.

== Highways ==
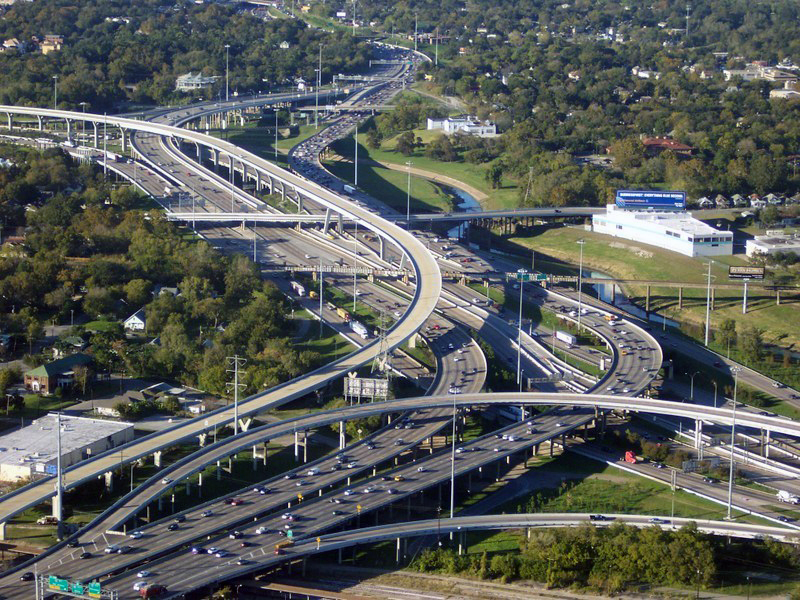
I-10 and I-45 interchange in Houston

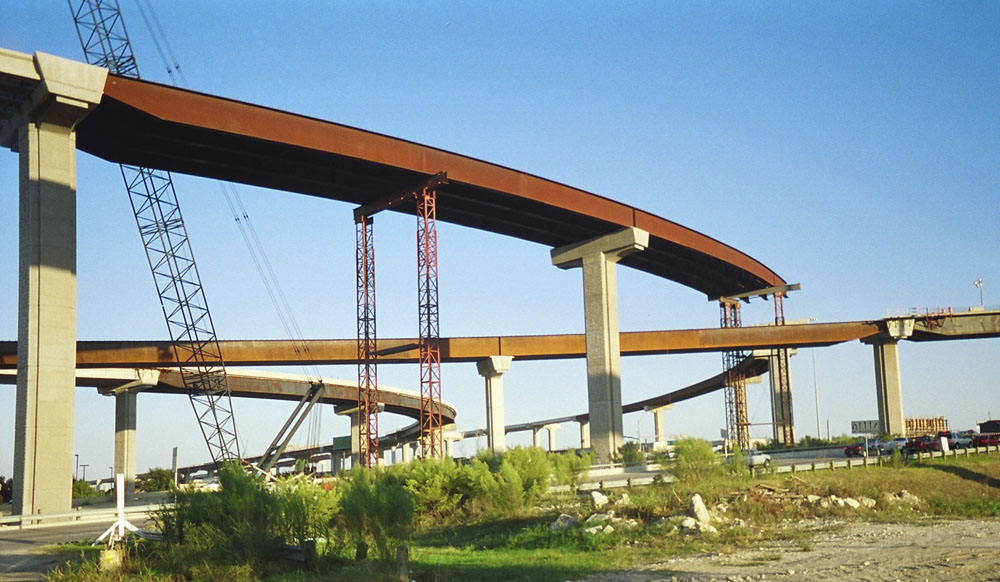
State Highway 45, the first of several toll roads in Central Texas, under construction

Texas freeways have been heavily traveled since their 1948 beginnings with a several-mile stretch of Houston's Gulf Freeway, and are often under construction to meet the demands of continuing growth. As of 2005, there were 79,535 miles (127,999 km) of public highway in Texas (up from 71,000 miles (114,000 km) in 1984). Texas Department of Transportation (TxDOT) planners have sought ways to reduce rush hour congestion, primarily through High-occupancy vehicle (HOV) lanes for vans and carpools. The "Texas T", an innovation originally introduced in Houston, is a ramp design that allows vehicles in the HOV lane, which is usually the center lane, to exit directly to transit centers or to enter the freeway directly into the HOV lane without crossing multiple lanes of traffic. Timed freeway entrances, which regulate the addition of cars to the freeway, are also common. Houston and San Antonio have extensive networks of freeway cameras linked to transit control centers to monitor and study traffic.

One characteristic of Texas's freeways are its frontage roads (also known as service roads, feeder roads, and access roads). Texas is the only state that widely constructs frontage/access roads along its highways even in the most remote areas. Frontage Roads - What are Frontage Roads and Why Does Texas Have So Many? Frontage roads provide access to the freeway from businesses alongside, such as gas stations and retail stores, and vice versa. Alongside most freeways along with the frontage roads are two to four lanes in each direction parallel to the freeway permitting easy access to individual city streets. A TxDOT policy change now limits the frontage road construction for new highways, but the existing frontage will remain. New landscaping projects and a longstanding ban on new billboards are ways Houston has tried to control the potential side effects of convenience.

Another common characteristic found near Texas overpasses are the Texas U-turns which is a lane allowing cars traveling on one side of a one-way frontage road to U-turn into the opposite frontage road (typically crossing over or under a freeway or expressway) without being stopped by traffic lights or crossing the highway traffic at-grade.

Most roads, such as rural two-lane roads, rural divided expressways and interstates, and urban interstates are posted at 75 mph (121 km/h), but some rural freeways and interstates have 80 mph (130 km/h) speed limits, and one toll road, Texas State Highway 130, has an 85 mph (137 km/h) speed limit, the highest in the United States.

== Airports ==
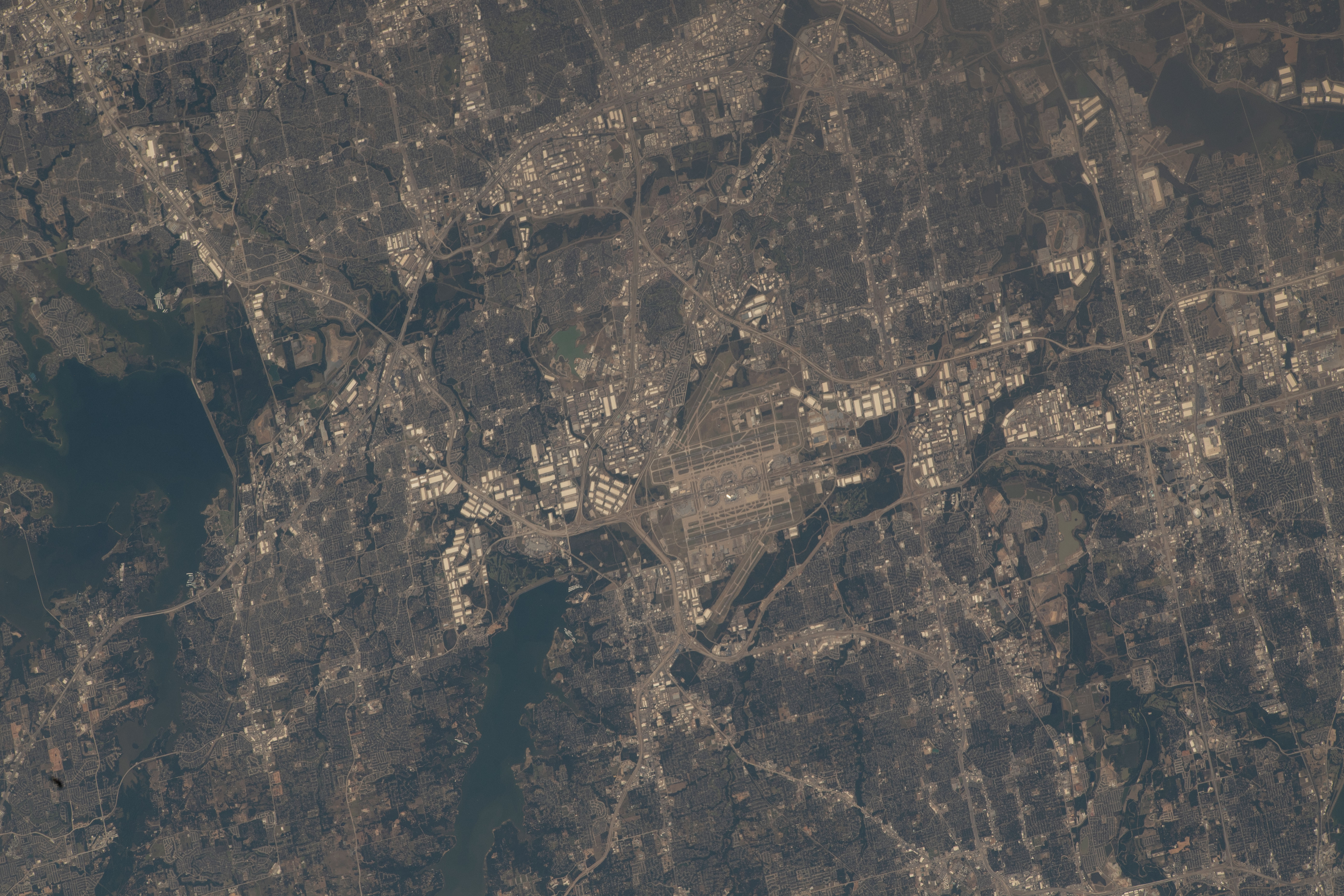
The DFW airport on July 1, 2022; taken from the International Space Station with north oriented to the left.

The Dallas–Fort Worth International Airport (DFW), located nearly equidistant from downtown Dallas and downtown Fort Worth, is the largest airport in the state, the second largest in the United States, and fourth largest in the world. The airport is the headquarters for American Airlines.

Texas's second-largest air facility is Houston's George Bush Intercontinental Airport (IAH). The airport is the tenth-busiest in the United States for total passengers, and nineteenth-busiest worldwide. The airport is the largest hub for United Airlines, with over 600 daily departures. A long list of cities within Texas, as well as international destinations, are served directly from this airport. With 30 destinations in Mexico, IAH offers service to more Mexican destinations than any other U.S. airports. IAH currently ranks second among U.S. airports with scheduled non-stop domestic and international service (221 destinations), trailing only Atlanta Hartsfield with 250 destinations.

Southwest Airlines, the largest domestic carrier in the United States began its operations at Dallas Love Field and is still headquartered in Dallas, Texas. It is the largest airline in the United States by number of passengers carried domestically per year and the fourth largest airline in the world by number of passengers carried.

Some of the other airports that are served by airlines include Dallas Love Field, Houston Hobby Airport, San Antonio International Airport, Austin-Bergstrom International Airport, El Paso International Airport, Lubbock Preston Smith International Airport, Rick Husband Amarillo International Airport, Midland International Airport, Brownsville/South Padre Island International Airport, and Valley International Airport in Harlingen, TX.

== Railroads ==
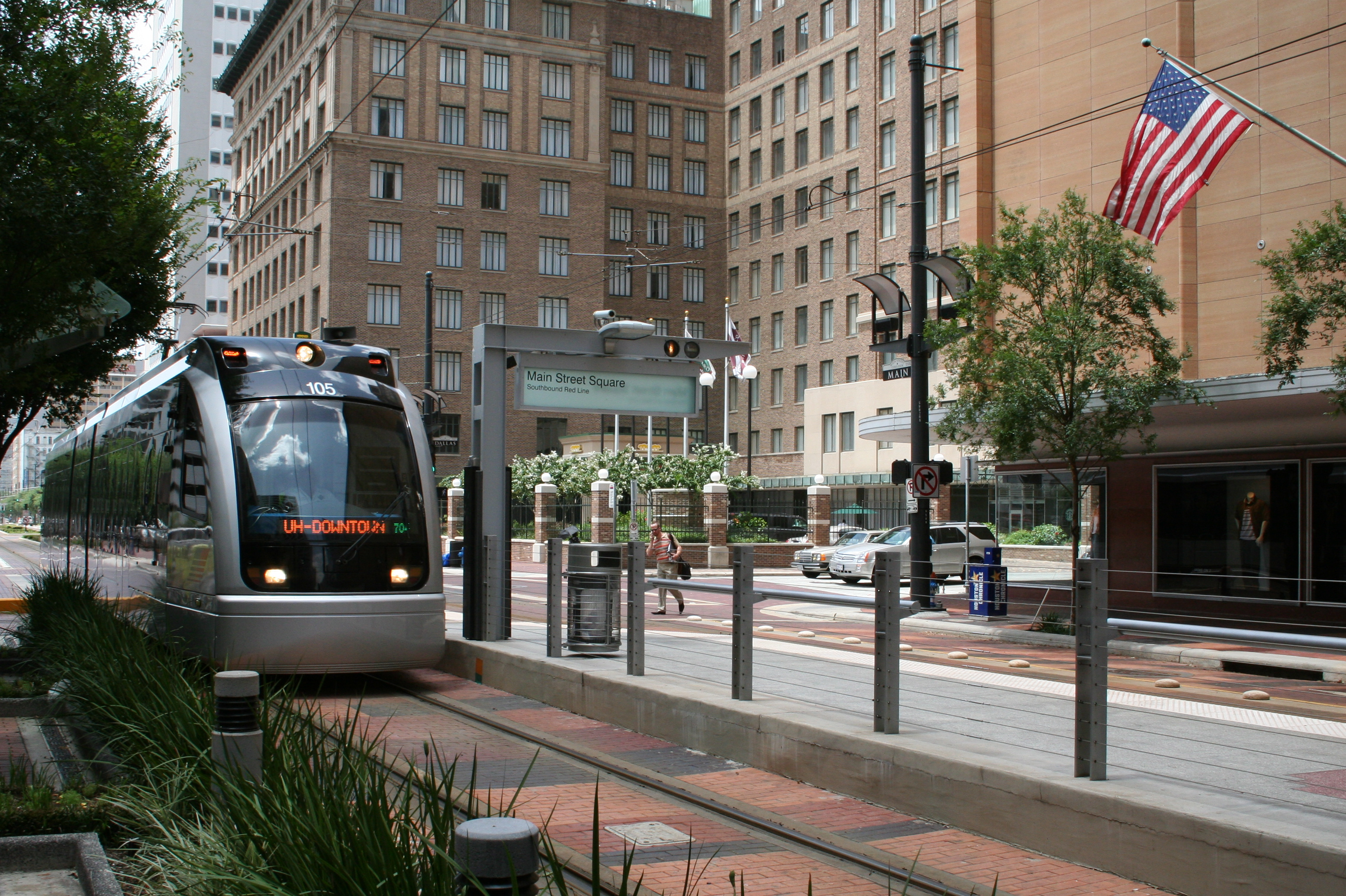
METRORail in Houston

Part of the state's cowboy legends are based on cattle drives where livestock was herded from Texas to railroads in Kansas. The first railroad in Texas completed in 1872, the Missouri-Kansas-Texas Railroad, diminished the need for these drives. The desire for the benefits of railroads was so strong that Dallasites paid $5,000 for the Houston and Central Texas Railroad to shift its route through its location, rather than Corsicana as planned. Since 1911, Texas has led the nation in railroad length. Texas railway mileage peaked in 1932 at 17,078 miles (27,484 km), but since has dwindled to 14,006 miles (22,540 km) in 2000. The state's oldest regulatory agency, the Railroad Commission of Texas, originally regulated the railroads, but in 2005, the state transferred these duties to TxDOT.

=== Passenger railroads ===
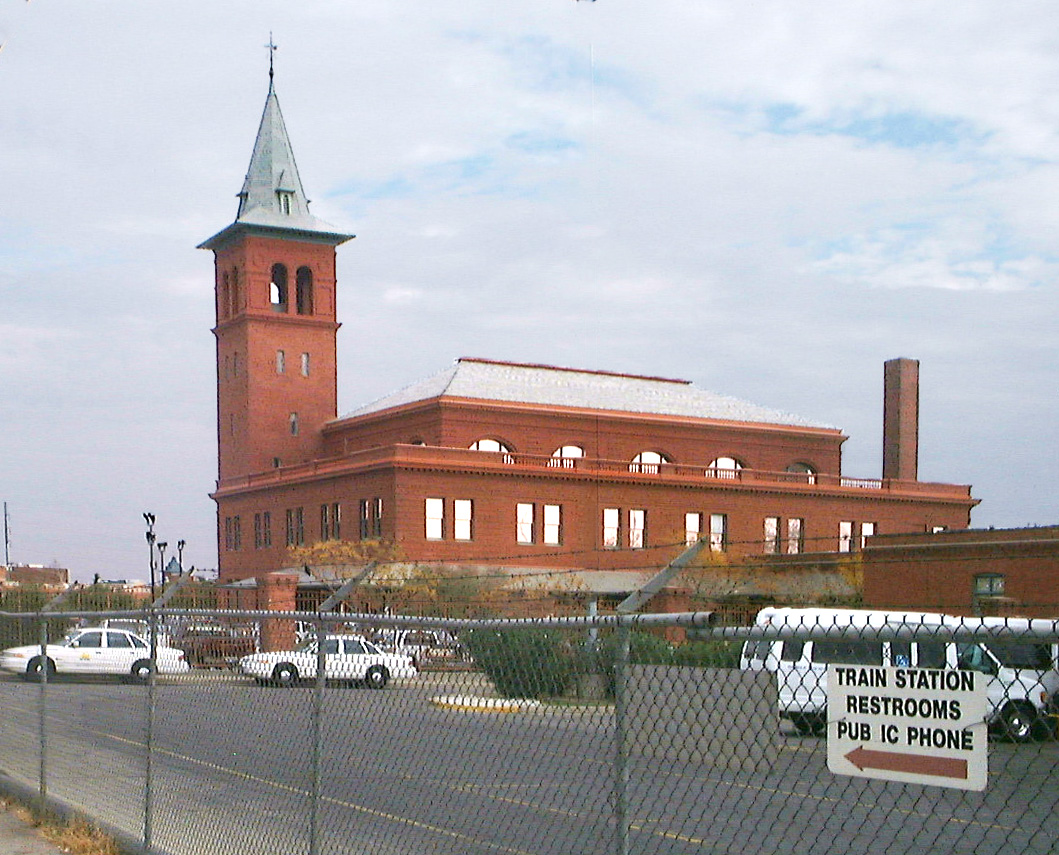
El Paso, Texas station with the westbound Sunset Limited

Passenger rail service in Texas is at this moment extremely limited from both network viewpoint (with only three routes) and frequency viewpoint (only daily or tri-weekly service), and is certainly to be considered below par for a developed state.

Currently three Amtrak trains serve Texas:

- the daily Texas Eagle connecting Chicago, Illinois with San Antonio, with three times a week through cars to Los Angeles. Texas stations served by this train are Marshall, Longview, Mineola, Dallas, Fort Worth, Cleburne, McGregor, Temple, Taylor, Austin, San Marcos and San Antonio, where through cars are coupled to the Sunset Limited.
- the tri-weekly Sunset Limited, connecting New Orleans, Louisiana to Los Angeles, California. Texas stations served are Beaumont, Houston and then 190 miles (310 km) non-stop to San Antonio, where the through cars of the Texas Eagle are coupled. Further west, following Texas localities are served: Del Rio, Sanderson, Alpine and El Paso.
- the daily Heartland Flyer, from Fort Worth (where it connects to the Texas Eagle) to Oklahoma City, Oklahoma, serving Texas stations: Fort Worth and Gainesville.

== Mass transportation ==
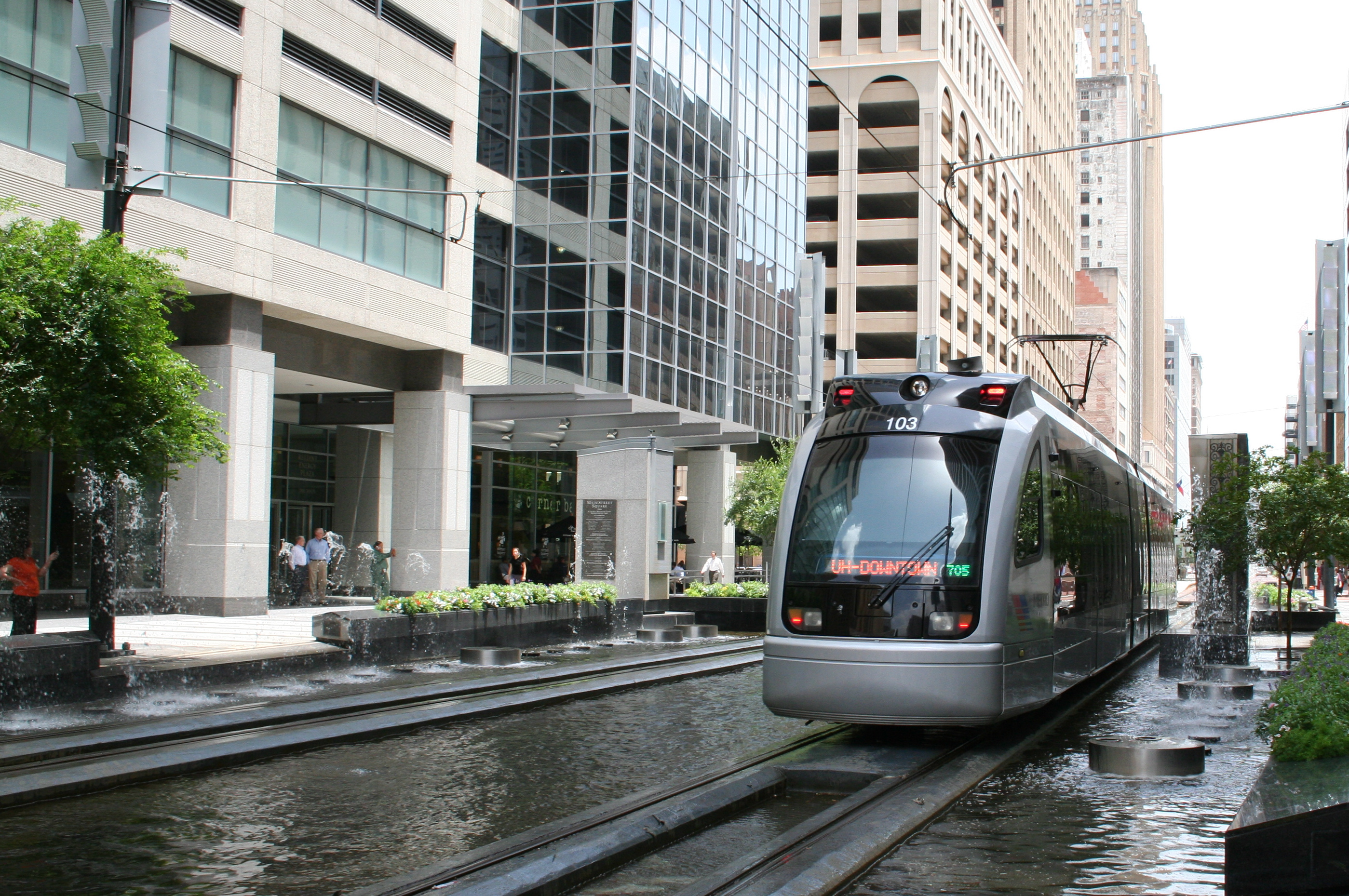
METRORail in Downtown Houston

Dallas-Fort Worth Rail

There are three mass transportation agencies in the Dallas–Fort Worth metroplex: Dallas Area Rapid Transit (DART), Denton County Transportation Authority (DCTA), and Trinity Metro (known as the Fort Worth Transportation Authority from 1983 to 2018). DART is a public transportation authority providing buses, rail, and HOV lanes to 13 municipalities primarily in Dallas County, with portions extending into Collin and Denton counties. DART began operating the first light rail system in the Southwest United States in 1996, with expansion into the surrounding counties through the 2010s. DART maintained the only light rail system in Texas until METRORail opened in Houston in 2004. Since beginning service in 1996, DART and Trinity Metro have conjointly operated the Trinity Railway Express (TRE) commuter rail line, connecting downtown Dallas and downtown Fort Worth since 2001. Trinity Metro serves Tarrant County through 3 member cities, providing bus and rail service DCTA that was created by the Texas Legislature in 2001 and approved by Denton County voters in 2002, providing a bus and commuter rail service, including the TRE and TEXRail. DCTA serves Denton County through three member cities, Denton, Lewisville, and Highland Village with bus and A-train commuter rail service. The city of Arlington remains the largest city in the United States not served by a public transportation system, instead using a ride-share service since 2017.

The Metropolitan Transit Authority of Harris County, Texas (METRO) operates bus, lift bus, light rail, and bus rapid transit service in Harris County, which includes Houston. METRO also operates bus service to two cities in Fort Bend County. METRO began running light rail service (METRORail) in Houston on January 1, 2004. Currently the track is rather short, running only 8 miles (13 km) from Downtown Houston to the Texas Medical Center and Reliant Park. However, construction begun in 2008 on a 30-mile (48 km) extension of the light rail system that was completed in 2013.

VIA Metropolitan Transit (VIA for short) operates bus service in the San Antonio area. VIA is expected to add bus rapid transit service to the area by 2012.

The Capital Metropolitan Transportation Authority (Capital Metro) operates bus service throughout the city of Austin and also operates the Capital MetroRail commuter rail line.

The Brownsville Urban System operates bus service throughout the city of Brownsville, Texas.

== Ports ==
Over 1,000 seaports dot Texas's coast with over 1,000 miles (1,600 km) of channels. Ports employ nearly one-million people and handle and average of 317 million metric tons. Texas ports are connected with the rest of the US Atlantic seaboard in the Gulf section of the Intracoastal Waterway. Until the deadliest hurricane in US history of 1900, the state's primary port, was Galveston. The Port of Houston replaced Galveston and today is the busiest port in the United States in foreign tonnage, second in overall tonnage, and tenth worldwide tonnage. The Houston Ship Channel is currently 530 feet (160 m) wide by 45 feet (14 m) deep by 50 miles (80 km) long and continues to be expanded.

== Trans-Texas Corridor ==
The Trans-Texas Corridor (TTC), officially canceled in 2011, was to have been composed of a 4,000-mile (6,000 km) network of supercorridors up to 1,200 feet (370 m) wide to carry parallel links of tollways, rails, and utility lines. The tollway portion would have been divided into two separate elements: truck lanes and lanes for passenger vehicles. Similarly, the rail lines in the corridor would have been divided among freight, commuter, and high-speed rail. The Texas Department of Transportation intended to "charge public and private concerns for utility, commodity or data transmission" within the corridor, in essence creating a toll road for services such as water, electricity, natural gas, petroleum, fiber optic lines, and other telecommunications services.

== See also ==
- Transportation in Dallas, Texas
- Airlines of Texas
- List of Texas railroads
- Plug-in electric vehicles in Texas
