= Hurricane Rita evacuation =

Deadly mass evacuation in September 2005

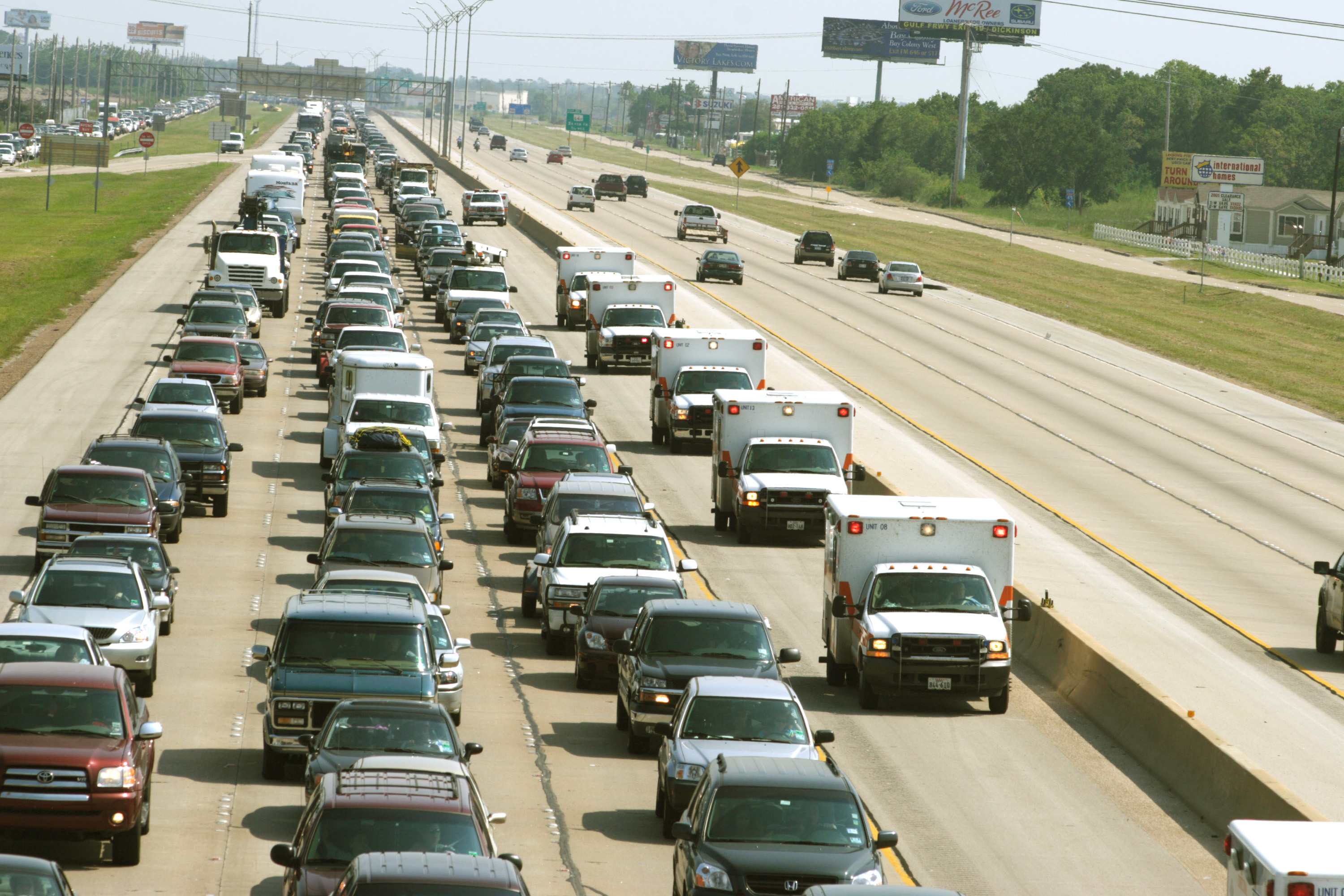
Northbound traffic on Interstate 45 heading outbound from Galveston, Texas, on September 21, 2005

The approach of Hurricane Rita towards the United States Gulf Coast in September 2005 triggered one of the largest mass evacuations in U.S. history. Between 2.5 and 3.7 million people evacuated from the Gulf coast, mostly from the Greater Houston area of Texas, with forecasts from the National Hurricane Center projecting Rita to strike the Texas Gulf Coast. Seeking to avoid a repeat of the devastation caused by Hurricane Katrina in parts of Louisiana and Mississippi less than a month prior, local officials began issuing evacuation orders on September 21 before the issuance of hurricane watches and warnings. Although evacuation orders anticipated smaller numbers of evacuees, uncertainties in projections of Rita's path and the fresh memory of Katrina's aftermath led many to evacuate, including from otherwise safe areas outside the scope of evacuation orders; approximately two-thirds of evacuees were not required to evacuate. The unexpectedly large scale of the evacuation overwhelmed Texas highways, producing widespread gridlock that was exacerbated by the implementation of previously unplanned contraflow on Interstates 10 and 45 while the evacuation was ongoing. Most traffic associated with the evacuation was clear of the threatened coastal areas by the early morning of September 23.

Evacuees fleeing by road did not anticipate the 12–36 hour travel times and faced shortages of fuel, water, food, and medical attention, as well as temperatures reaching 100 °F (38 °C) accompanied by high humidity. The mass evacuation was unusually deadly; 107 evacuees died during the mass evacuation, much more than the number of people directly killed by Rita's forces and accounting for a majority of the deaths associated with the hurricane. Many died as a result of factors related to heat exhaustion exacerbated by traffic congestion, and 23 nursing home residents died in a bus fire near Dallas.

== Meteorological background and forecasts ==
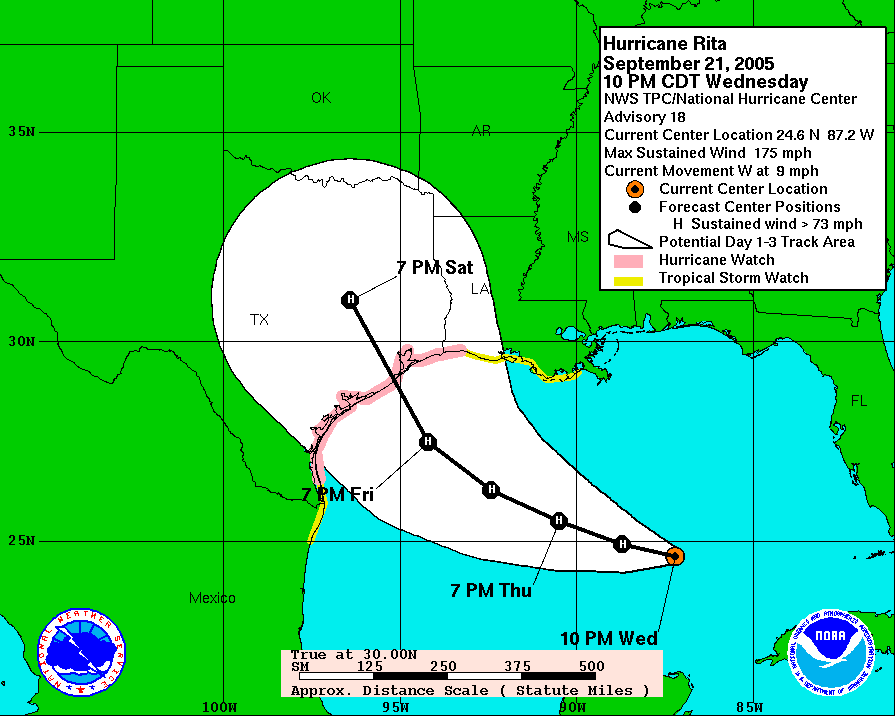
The National Hurricane Center's forecast path for Hurricane Rita on the night of September 21, depicting a track towards the Greater Houston area

The 2005 Atlantic hurricane season featured an unprecedented amount of tropical cyclone activity and was the most active Atlantic hurricane season based on various metrics, including by number of tropical storms, by number of hurricanes, by number of hurricanes rated Category 5 on the Saffir–Simpson scale, and by the total amount of accumulated cyclone energy. (Note: The 2020 Atlantic hurricane season later surpassed the 2005 season in terms of the number of tropical and subtropical cyclones. Storms may have gone undetected prior to the advent of aircraft reconnaissance in the mid-1940s and weather satellites in the mid-1960s.) A record number of major hurricanes struck the U.S. in 2005, (Note: A major hurricane is a storm that ranks as Category 3 or higher on the Saffir–Simpson hurricane wind scale.) and collectively the over $100 billion in damage caused by the seven tropical cyclones making landfall on the U.S. made 2005 the costliest hurricane season on record. (Note: The damage toll was later surpassed by the 2017 Atlantic hurricane season.)

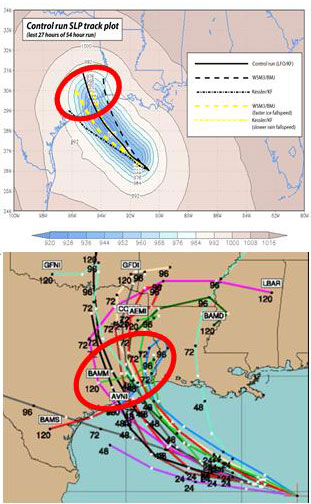
Tropical cyclone forecast model projections of Rita's track on September 22

Hurricane Rita was the first storm to make landfall on the U.S. following Hurricane Katrina, which had caused widespread destruction in Louisiana and Mississippi less than a month prior. Rita was first designated as a tropical depression by September 18, 2005, east of the Turks and Caicos. It strengthened into a tropical storm later that day while tracking towards the west-northwest across the southeastern Bahamas. Rita's intensification was initially gradual but accelerated as the storm moved through the Florida Straits. It strengthened into a hurricane within the straits on September 20 and continued to rapidly intensify as it moved into the Gulf of Mexico. Fueled by the very warm waters of the Loop Current, and within an environment characterized by low wind shear, Rita intensified into a Category 5 hurricane on September 21. Rita reached its peak intensity at around 10 p.m. (Note: All times are in Central Standard Time unless otherwise noted.) on September 21, bearing maximum sustained winds of around 180 mph (285 km/h) and a minimum barometric pressure of 895 mbar (hPa; 26.43 inHg). This made Rita the most intense hurricane in the Gulf of Mexico and the fourth most intense hurricane in the Atlantic on record, until it was tied with Hurricane Milton in 2024. Rita was also a large hurricane at the time of peak intensity, with tropical storm-force winds extending up to 185 mi (285 km) from the storm's center. During its remaining time over the Gulf of Mexico, Rita curved towards the northwest and weakened to a Category 3 hurricane upon making landfall over southwestern Louisiana near the state border with Texas on September 24. Rita weakened as it progressed farther inland and its remnants were absorbed by a cold front on September 26 over the southern Great Lakes region. The hurricane ultimately caused at least $10 billion in damage, though it narrowly missed major population centers. Nonetheless, Rita's large size produced tropical storm-force winds over Southeast Texas and much of Louisiana.

On average, the error between forecast tracks from the National Hurricane Center (NHC) and Rita's actual path were substantially smaller than the agency's average over the preceding 10 years. (Note: The NHC's forecasts for Hurricane Rita predicted its future position 12, 24, 36, 48, 72, 96, and 120 hours out from the time of forecast issuance. At those leadtimes, the average error between the forecast position and Rita's actual path was 31 mi (50 km), 62 mi (100 km), 87 mi (141 km), 107 mi (172 km), 138 mi (222 km), 189 mi (304 km), and 227 mi (365 km), respectively.) Track forecasts from the NHC before Rita became a hurricane accurately predicted Rita's path into the Gulf of Mexico and the storm's subsequent curve towards the northwest. However, in response to unanimous shifts in the tracks projected by tropical cyclone forecast models, forecast tracks from the agency between September 20–21 were biased southward and were too slow in depicting Rita's northwestward curve. As a result, the forecast track pointed towards the central Texas Gulf Coast well west of where Rita ultimately made landfall. NHC track forecasts were more accurate afterwards leading up to landfall following a northward shift from the model guidance.

== Timeline ==
=== September 19 ===
- Galveston, Texas, officials plan for a voluntary evacuation of the city to begin at 2 p.m. on September 20.
- 10 a.m. – A conference call is held between members of the Texas state government and local officials, directing local jurisdictions to follow the state's hurricane preparedness plans.

=== September 20 ===
- Early – The State of Texas finalizes its mandatory evacuation timeline for storm surge zones.
- Texas Governor Rick Perry issues a proclamation underscoring the threat of Hurricane Rita and urges the evacuation of residents in coastal areas.
- Galveston County officials order the mandatory evacuation of coastal communities; the order is the first mandatory evacuation order in Texas in response to Hurricane Rita. The evacuation plan directs the evacuation of nursing homes and assisted living facilities at 6 a.m. on September 21 followed by evacuation of the general population beginning 12 hours later.
- The City of Houston orders a mandatory evacuation of the city's public shelters housing evacuees from Hurricane Katrina, including Reliant Arena and the George R. Brown Convention Center. Many of the evacuees are sent to shelters in Arkansas.
- Afternoon and evening – Other Texas cities and local jurisdictions join Galveston in ordering voluntary evacuations
- Late – Corpus Christi and Port Aransas, Texas, officials order the mandatory evacuation of high-profile vehicles from Flour Bluff, Mustang Island, and Padre Island

=== September 21 ===
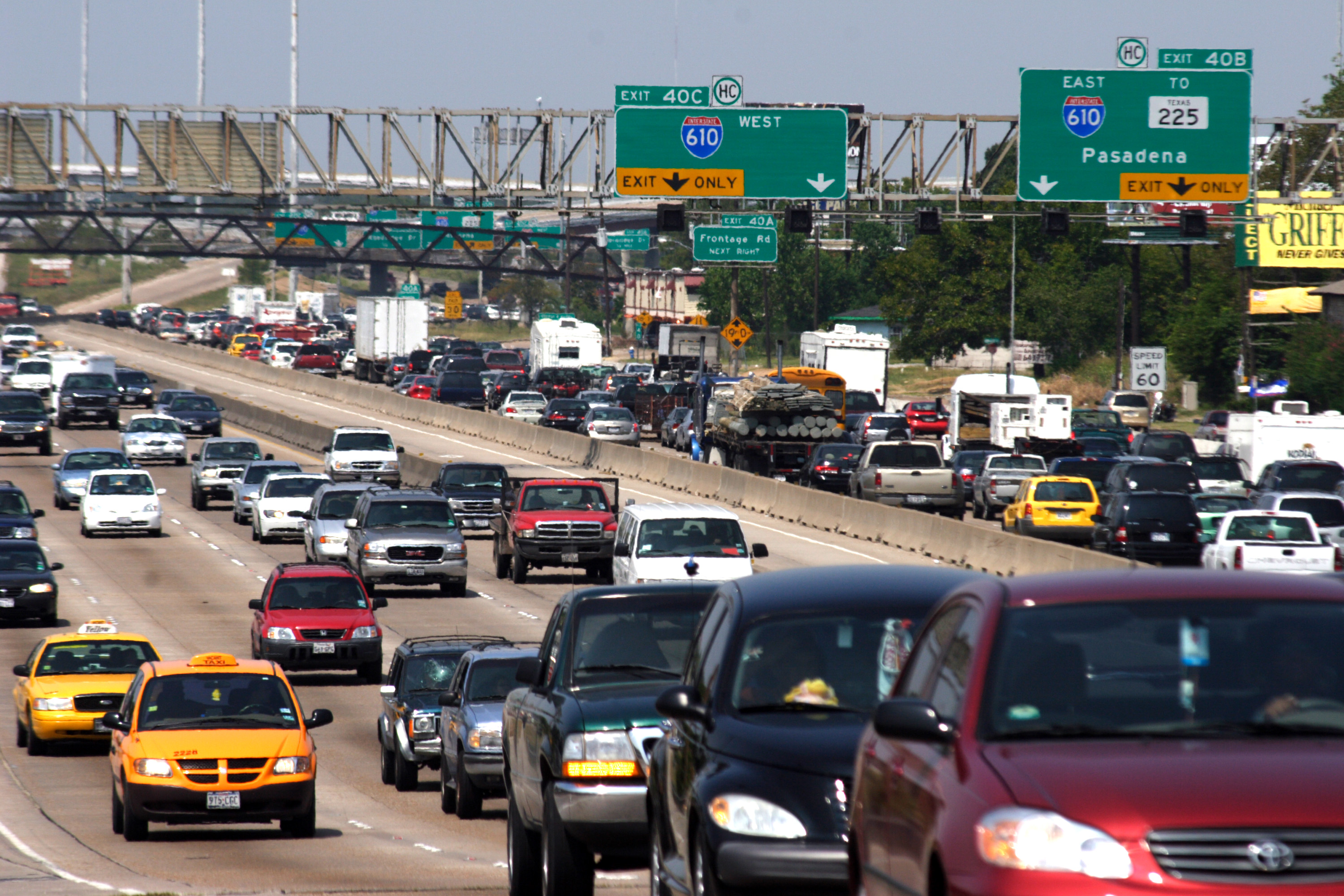
Heavy traffic in Houston associated with the mass evacuation on September 21

- 9:30 a.m. – Bill White, the Mayor of Houston, Texas, orders the mandatory evacuation of low-lying areas of Houston and recommends the voluntary evacuation of mobile homes and flood-prone neighborhoods.
- Early afternoon – The State of Texas implements its hurricane traffic management plan early for Texas State Highway 6 to alleviate traffic congestion
- 4:00 p.m. – The NHC issues a hurricane watch for coastal areas between Port Mansfield, Texas, and Cameron, Louisiana. The hurricane watch region is bracketed by a tropical storm watch that extends eastward to Grand Isle, Louisiana, and southward past the U.S.–Mexico border to the San Fernando River.
- 6:00 p.m. – The State of Texas orders a mandatory evacuation for Zone A and fully enacts the state's traffic management plan for the state's evacuation routes

=== September 22 ===
- Early morning – A shift in the NHC forecast track for Rita eastward prompts the immediate mandatory evacuation of the Texas Golden Triangle and parts of southwestern Louisiana
- 6:00 a.m. – Wharton County, Texas, begins mandatory evacuations. Governor Perry approves the use of contraflow.
- 8:00 a.m. – Mandatory evacuations begin in Victoria County, Texas.
- 10:00 a.m. – The NHC issues a hurricane warning for coastal areas between Port O'Connor, Texas, and Morgan City, Louisiana.
- 12:00 p.m. – Contraflow is implemented on 80 mi (130 km) of Interstate 45 in Texas. A total of 149 mi (240 km) of the interstate would be in contraflow by 2:30 p.m.
- 1:00 p.m. – Contraflow is implemented on 110 mi (180 km) of Interstate 10 in Texas between Katy and Seguin. A total of 141 mi (227 km) of the interstate would be in contraflow by 3:00 p.m.
- 6:00 p.m. – Contraflow is implemented on 80 mi (130 km) of U.S. Route 59 in Texas beginning near Porter. A total of 135 mi (217 km) of the highway would be in contraflow by 8:00 p.m.

=== September 24 ===
- 2:40 a.m. – Hurricane Rita makes landfall between Sabine Pass and Johnson Bayou, Louisiana.
- 10:00 a.m. – The NHC downgrades all remaining hurricane warnings to tropical storm warnings.
- 7:00 p.m. – All tropical cyclone warnings and watches issued by the NHC are discontinued.

== Evacuation ==
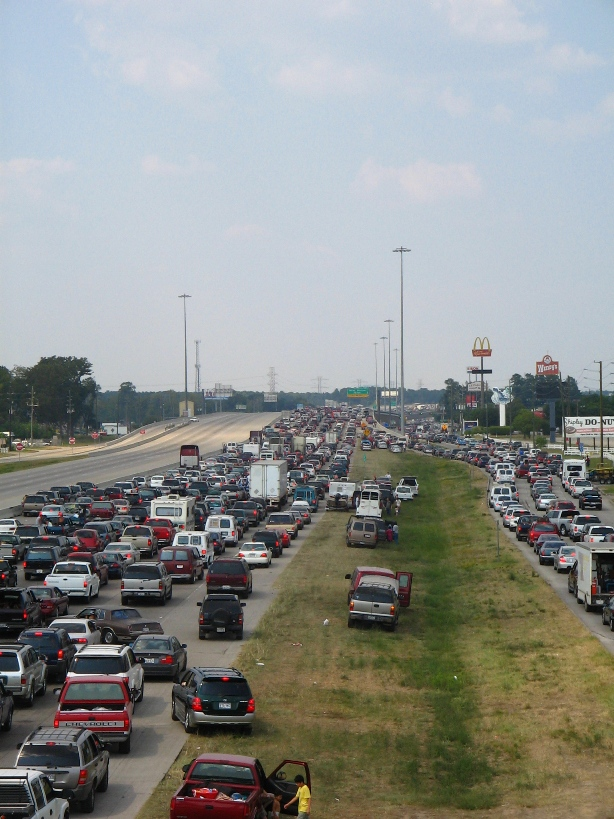
Traffic associated with the evacuation along I-45 near Louetta Road north of Houston on September 21

Prior to Rita, the Texas Division of Emergency Management (TDEM) engaged in several activities related to ensuring hurricane preparedness in Texas in 2005, coordinating drills, exercises, and workshops concerning mass evacuation and performing a review of the agency's evacuation plans. The TDEM also introduced Shelter Hubs and Evacuation Information Shelters to the state's evacuation procedures; Shelter Hubs were designated locations where state and local officials could quickly open shelters and provision resources while Evacuation Information Shelters were temporary roadside facilities at rest areas intended to provide information and supplies to evacuees. The 79th Texas Legislature passed and enacted a bill earlier in 2005 granting county judges and mayors the authority to order evacuations of their jurisdictions; Rita prompted the first exercise of those powers.

The mass evacuation prompted by Rita was one of the largest emergency evacuations in U.S. history. At least 2.5 million people evacuated ahead of Rita, with a majority leaving the Houston area. Most of the evacuations occurred in Texas, with fewer evacuees in Louisiana. The House Research Organization (HRO) of the Texas House of Representatives estimated that as many as 3.7 million people evacuated from the Texas coast between Corpus Christi and Beaumont. Approximately 1.7 million vehicles were involved in the mass evacuation in Texas compared to an anticipated 445,000. Evacuation orders in the Houston area included 400,000 people who had recently relocated there following Hurricane Katrina. Around 110,000 people evacuated from the Beaumont area. The University of Texas Medical Branch at Galveston evacuated all patients and staff for the first time in its 114-year history. The airlifting of 1,100 patients to other hospitals in Texas was one of the largest air evacuations in U.S. history. Compliance with evacuation orders in Cameron Parish, Louisiana, was around 100 percent while 85–90 percent of Galveston County, Texas, evacuated. Post-storm surveys suggested that over half of evacuees may have left within two days of Rita's landfall. A random survey of 651 people in eight Houston-area counties found that 76 percent of respondents in evacuation zones evacuated and 47 percent of respondents residing outside of evacuation zones evacuated.

The scale of the evacuation was amplified by uncertainties in the future track and intensity of the hurricane as well as the aftermath of Hurricane Katrina. Forecast uncertainties contributed to the evacuation of several communities along the Texas Gulf Coast, including those that ultimately avoided significant impacts from Rita. Although evacuation plans in the Houston area projected the evacuation of at most 1.25 million people, thousands of people evacuated from relatively safe areas due to what state and local officials termed the "Katrina effect". The trauma of Katrina's impacts and aftermath led many to evacuate unnecessarily; an estimated two-thirds of evacuees contributed to a large shadow evacuation. Government officials urged evacuations and evoked the devastation caused by Katrina in an effort to avoid a repeat of the previous hurricane's impacts and encourage compliance. Evacuations were ordered early in various communities, motivated by what was perceived as a late evacuation in response to Katrina. The combination of vague evacuation instructions and fear tactics were factors in the large shadow evacuation. A survey of 120 Gulf Coast residents conducted by Texas A&M University found that the decision to evacuate for over half of respondents was influenced by the effects of Hurricane Katrina. (Note: Up to 250,000 evacuees from Hurricane Katrina relocated to Houston, Texas.) Most of the survey respondents stated that the strength of Rita and the forecast was the primary reason for deciding whether or not to evacuate rather than the issuance of an evacuation order. A review of large-scale evacuations by the U.S. Nuclear Regulatory Commission in 2008 characterized the mass evacuation associated with Rita as "by most accounts a failure", though it considered the evacuation out of Galveston as "very successful." Harris County Judge Robert Eckels described poor communication as the largest failure of the evacuation process.

=== Traffic congestion ===
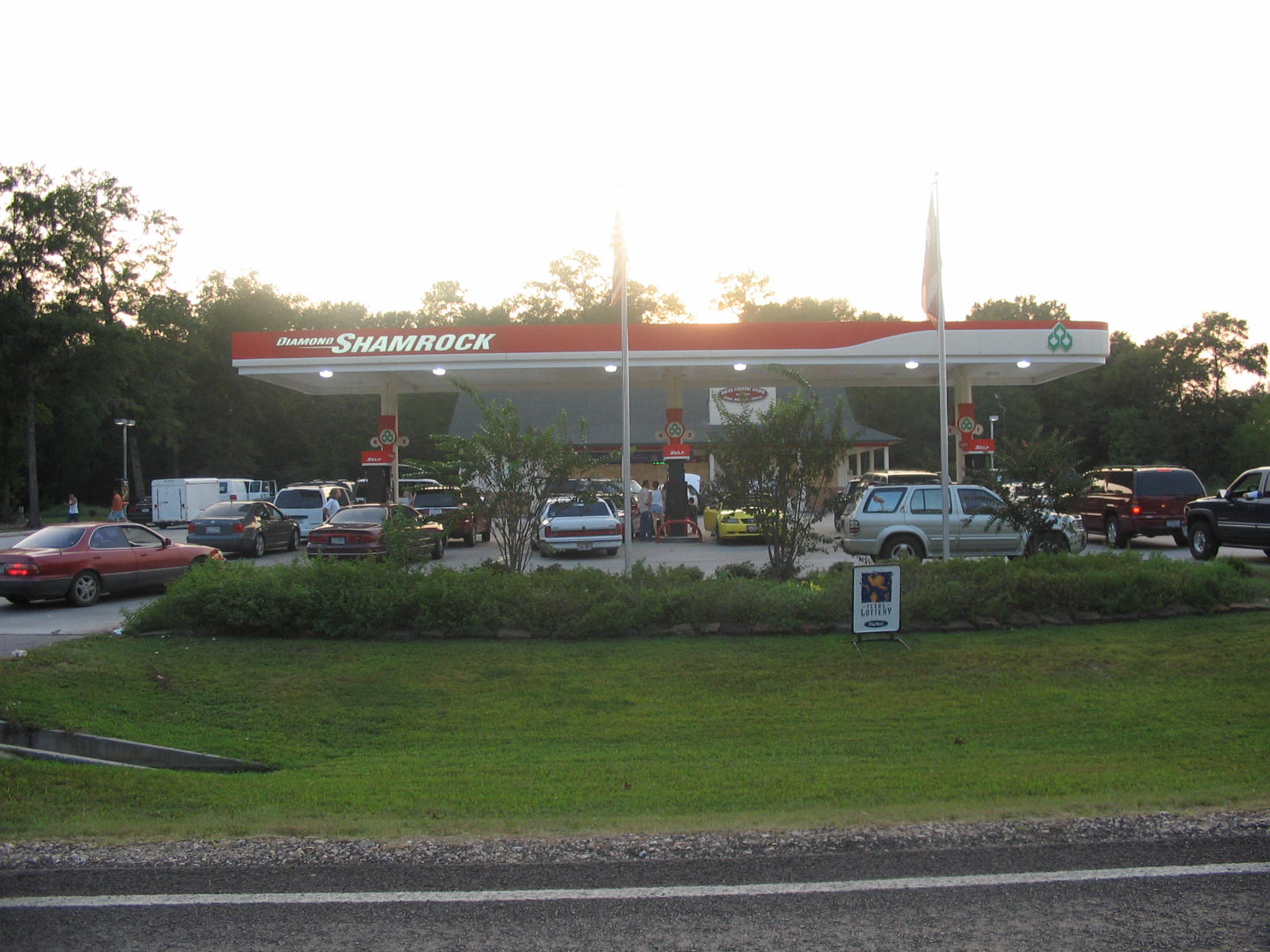
Evacuees at a gas station on September 22

The evacuation led to high traffic congestion along Texas highways, with evacuees spending as much as 12–36 hours evacuating. Evacuees leaving Galveston, Texas, took 4–5 hours to reach Houston 50 mi (80 km) away and spent as much as 35 hours reaching their evacuation destinations. Travel times averaged between 18 and 25 hours from Houston to Dallas and between 14 and 16 hours from Houston to San Antonio. The average evacuation distance was around 198 mi (319 km) and traffic jams extended for over 100 mi (160 km). Evacuation routes began to become congested on the early afternoon September 21 as evacuees heeding voluntary evacuation orders began fleeing the coast prior to the complete implementation of the state's traffic management plan. Traffic conditions worsened as the first mandatory evacuation orders came into effect at 6:00 p.m. that day, and by 10:00 p.m. evacuation routes were in gridlock; traffic conditions would continue to worsen as additional areas were placed under mandatory evacuation orders. Most evacuation traffic was clear of storm surge inundation zones by the early morning of September 23. The traffic congestion associated with the evacuation was the worst in Houston history. Although evacuation plans intended for residents of low-lying coastal areas to evacuate before other groups, the unnecessary evacuation of residents at higher elevations and the mandatory evacuations order for inland counties undermined the staggered evacuation design. Evacuation routes in Texas were overwhelmed by the unexpected traffic volume despite the implementation of the state's traffic management plan, which intended to expedite northward traffic flow out of storm surge areas. Uncertainty over whether or not to utilize contraflow on highways leading to San Antonio and Dallas led to delays in its implementation; the use of contraflow was not a part of state evacuation plans and was previously considered too logistically complex and labor-intensive by state officials. (Note: Contraflow was only a component of evacuation plans for Interstate 37 between Corpus Christi and San Antonio. Modeling studies conducted before the 2004 Atlantic hurricane season suggested that the preexisting routes could sufficiently handle hurricane evacuations.) Contraflow was eventually enacted on Interstate 45 and Interstate 10 but took 12 hours to fully implement. State officials reversed their decision to switch some roads to a contraflow pattern to support resources reaching coastal areas. Weather conditions along evacuation routes were also dangerously hot and humid. Relative humidity values around 94 percent accompanied temperatures as high as 100 °F (38 °C) in Houston and 95 °F (35 °C) in Galveston.

Many evacuees did not expect the poor traffic conditions and lacked access to necessities such as food, water, and fuel. Stymied by the traffic congestion, many stopped evacuating; the number of people estimated to have returned home mid-evacuation was on the order of tens of thousands. Evacuation routes also lacked services for evacuees, with routes traversing through rural communities lacking adequate health infrastructure and the traffic gridlock hindering the response to medical emergencies. Around 150,000 vehicles were in a dense traffic jam on a 30 mi (48 km) stretch of the four-lane Interstate 45 in one rural county north of Houston on September 22. The evacuation routes leading from Beaumont, Texas, to Lufkin, Nacogdoches, and Tyler provided no access to bathroom facilities. The Texas Department of Transportation (TxDOT) barricaded 130 highway entrance and exit ramps to mitigate vehicular collisions when implementing contraflow mid-evacuation, preventing evacuees from leaving evacuation routes. Although Evacuation Information Centers intended to address evacuee needs were established along evacuation routes and were successful early in the evacuation, the sheer number of evacuees and the resulting traffic congestion rendered them ineffective. Evacuees seeking to bypass the traffic congestion took alternate routes, avoiding the state's evacuation infrastructure and thus impeding the state's ability to monitor the evacuation process and determine evacuee needs. Many vehicles ran out of fuel during the evacuation, and in some areas the scarcity of fuel was exacerbated by power outages impacting gas stations, fuel truck drivers not reporting to work, and the suspension of fuel supply and distribution centers in Southeast Texas. National Guard refueling trucks could not refuel marooned vehicles as they were only equipped with nozzles intended for jet aircraft.

Among the evacuees were nursing home residents who evacuated via bus, and many spent up to 24 hours traveling; evacuation plans for nursing home facilities were either untested or non-existent at the time despite state requirements. The school buses acquired by five nursing homes for the evacuation lacked air conditioning, and the selection of the same bus service by over ten nursing homes caused a shortage of buses for evacuation. An airlift from Ellington Field was requested by Houston officials to evacuate stranded individuals, of which many were from hospitals and nursing homes in Baytown and Pasadena.

=== Fatalities ===
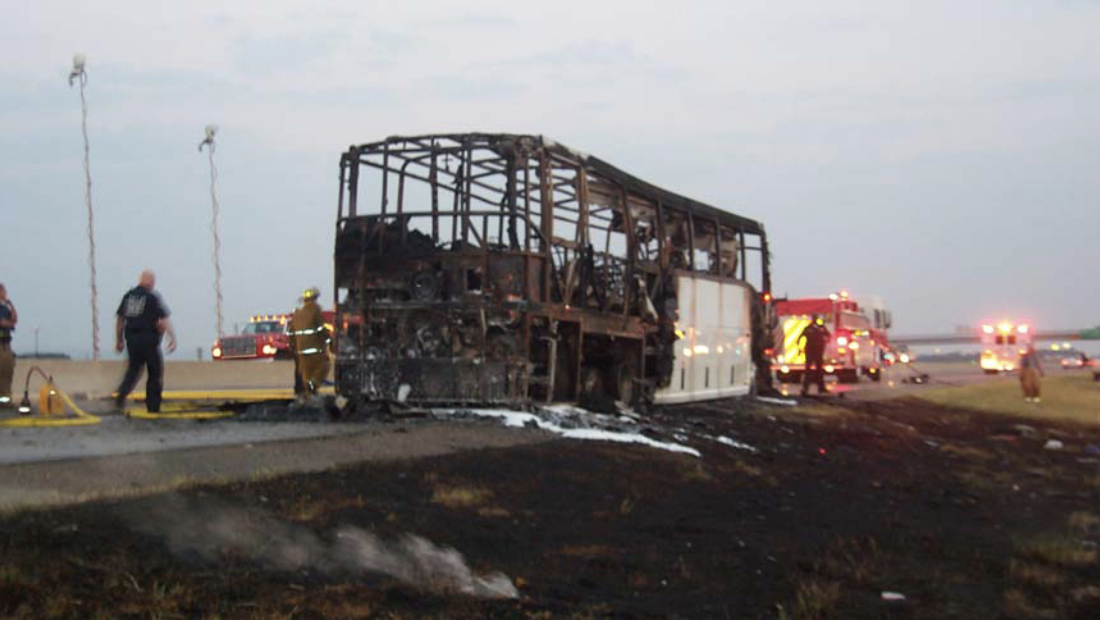
The remains of a bus that caught fire near Wilmer, Texas, while evacuating 44 assisted living facility residents and staff, resulting in 23 deaths

The deaths of around 107 people were associated with the mass evacuation ahead of Rita. Ninety people died during the mass evacuation in Texas, accounting for more fatalities than the direct impacts of Hurricane Rita and constituting a majority of the fatalities associated with the storm. (Note: Three people were killed by trees felled by Rita's winds in Texas. Other deaths were neither directly associated with Rita's effects nor the mass evacuation.) The high death toll associated with the mass evacuation was anomalous compared to other hurricane evacuations. (Note: The evacuations associated with Hurricane Georges (~1.2 million people) in 1998 and Hurricane Floyd in 1999 (~2.6 million people) did not result in any fatalities. Only one death was linked to the evacuation of around 2 million people ahead of Hurricane Katrina.) Over half of the fatalities were people found unresponsive in their vehicles; these 46 fatalities were potentially associated with hyperthermia and decompensated chronic health conditions resulting from a combination of factors including high temperatures, traffic congestion, and behaviors stemming from evacuation by road. The decision to turn off automotive air conditioning to conserve fuel or prevent engine overheating may have also contributed to producing deadly conditions during the evacuation. The Harris County Medical Examiner found that temperatures in the vehicles where people were found unresponsive reached as high as 112 °F (44 °C). Another 10 people died during the evacuations of chronic health facilities.

At around 6:00 a.m. on September 23, a motorcoach evacuating 44 residents and staff from a nursing home Bellaire, Texas, caught fire on Interstate 45 near Wilmer, Texas, en route for Dallas. The vehicle pulled over after a passing motorist alerted the driver that the coach's right-rear tire hub was glowing red. Smoke and fire quickly consumed the coach after evacuation of its passengers began, killing 23 people, seriously injuring 2, and inflicting minor injuries to the remaining 19 survivors. A subsequent investigation by the National Transportation Safety Board (NTSB) concluded that the fire was likely caused by wheel bearing failure resulting from insufficient lubrication of the rear axle that enabled overheating of the wheel. The NTSB also determined that the coach operator, Global Limo Inc., failed to perform proper vehicle maintenance that may have prevented the fatal incident. An investigation conducted by The Houston Chronicle found another 18 deaths of nursing home residents associated with the evacuation.

== Aftermath ==
Texas Governor Rick Perry, Harris County Judge Robert Eckels, and Houston Mayor Bill White established a 14-member task force with the purpose of assessing challenges associated with the mass evacuation in October 2005. The group published its findings in February 2006, making several recommendations including public–private partnership to provision fuel along evacuation routes and the regular positioning of medical equipment and personnel along those routes. Pursuant to the recommendations, Governor Perry issued an executive order directing the Texas Department of Transportation and Texas Oil and Gas Association to develop an emergency fuel support plan. The positioning of drinking water, ice, restrooms, and medical assistance along evacuation routes was added to the state's emergency management plan. Bill Read, the director of the NHC in 2008, speculated that experience with the tumultuous evacuation ahead of Rita contributed to some refusing mandatory evacuation orders ahead of Hurricane Ike three years after Rita.

== See also ==
- Hurricane evacuation
- Hurricane Floyd § Preparations – triggered the evacuation of millions along the southeast U.S. coast in 1999
- 2013 El Reno tornado § Evacuations – prompted evacuations of areas recently impacted by tornadoes days prior
