= DCAT =

DCAT may refer to:

- Data Catalog Vocabulary
- De La Salle College Admission Test of the De La Salle University in the Philippines
- Drive Clean Across Texas, a program related to transportation in Texas

== See also ==
- Department of Civil Aviation (Thailand)
