= Temple station (disambiguation) =

Temple station may refer to:

- Temple tube station, a London Underground station
- Temple station (Texas), an Amtrak station
- Temple University station, a SEPTA Regional Rail station
- Temple station (Paris Metro), a Paris Metro station
