= McGregor station =

Amtrak train station in McGregor, Texas

McGregor, TX

General information
- Location: 1 Amtrak Boulevard; McGregor, Texas; United States
- Coordinates: 31.4433°N 97.4048°W
- Line: BNSF Railway
- Platforms: 1 side platform
- Tracks: 1

Other information
- Station code: Amtrak: MCG

History
- Opened: 1904

Passengers
- FY 2025: 4,370 (Amtrak)

Services
| Preceding station | Amtrak | Following station |
|---|---|---|
| Temple toward Los Angeles or San Antonio | Texas Eagle | Cleburne toward Chicago |
Former services
| Preceding station | Amtrak | Following station |
|---|---|---|
| Temple toward Laredo or Houston | Inter-American | Cleburne toward Chicago |
| Temple toward Houston | Lone Star | Cleburne toward Chicago |
| Preceding station | Atchison, Topeka and Santa Fe Railway | Following station |
| Crawford toward Purcell | Gulf, Colorado and Santa Fe Railway Main Line | Moody toward Galveston |
Location

McGregor station is a train station in McGregor, Texas, United States, served by Amtrak, the national railroad passenger system. The station was originally built as an Atchison, Topeka and Santa Fe Railway depot. It is the closest Amtrak station to Waco, approximately 16 miles (26 km) east.
