= Del Rio station =

Intermodal transportation center in Del Rio, Texas, U.S.

Del Rio, TX
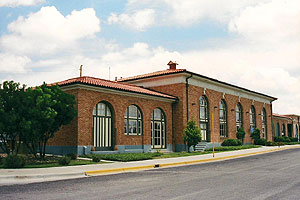
- Del Rio station in July 2002

General information
- Location: 100 North Main Street; Del Rio, Texas; United States
- Coordinates: 29.3624°N 100.9026°W
- Owner: City of Del Rio
- Line: UP Sanderson / Del Rio Subdivisions
- Platforms: 1 side platform
- Tracks: 2

Other information
- Station code: Amtrak: DRT

History
- Opened: 1876

Passengers
- FY 2025: 2,148 (Amtrak)

Services
Preceding station	Amtrak	Following station
Sanderson toward Los Angeles	Sunset Limited	San Antonio toward New Orleans
Sanderson toward Los Angeles	Texas Eagle	San Antonio toward Chicago
Former services
Preceding station	Southern Pacific Railroad	Following station
Sanderson toward Los Angeles	Sunset Route	Spofford toward New Orleans
- Southern Pacific Passenger Depot
- U.S. National Register of Historic Places
- Location: 101 West Ogden Street, Del Rio, Texas
- NRHP reference No.: 100012685
- Added to NRHP: February 2, 2026
Location

Del Rio station is an intermodal transportation center in Del Rio, Texas, United States served by Amtrak, the national railroad passenger system, as well as by local bus service.

== History ==
The station was built in the 1920s to replace an earlier wooden structure. It consists of a center block flanked by two recessed wings, one of which originally served as an outdoor waiting room. The main façade is dominated by five large, round-arch windows accented with scrolled keystones. Below the hipped roof of Spanish red tile, an entablature wraps around the center block. It features classic dentil molding as well as decorative panels, one of which reads “DEL RIO.”

Amtrak completed station upgrades at Del Rio station in October 2023 as part of a $3.8 million project. As part of the construction, Amtrak installed new signage, an enclosure for a wheelchair lift, upgrading facilities for the Americans with Disabilities Act of 1990. They also installed a 650-foot (200 m) concrete side platform, with walkways connecting to the Del Rio Regional Transportation Center upgraded. A ribbon cutting ceremony occurred on October 10.

On February 2, 2026, the station was added to the National Register of Historic Places under the name of Southern Pacific Passenger Depot.
