= Sanderson station =

Train station in Sanderson, Texas, U.S.

Sanderson, TX

General information
- Location: 201 West Downie Street; Sanderson, Texas; United States
- Coordinates: 30°08′24″N 102°23′57″W
- Owner: Union Pacific Railroad
- Line: UP Sanderson Subdivision
- Platforms: 1 side platform
- Tracks: 2

Construction
- Parking: Yes
- Accessible: Yes

Other information
- Status: Unstaffed, shelter
- Station code: Amtrak: SND

History
- Opened: 1882
- Rebuilt: 2021

Passengers
- FY 2025: 277 (Amtrak)

Services
Preceding station	Amtrak	Following station
Alpine toward Los Angeles	Sunset Limited	Del Rio toward New Orleans
Alpine toward Los Angeles	Texas Eagle	Del Rio toward Chicago
Former services
Preceding station	Southern Pacific Railroad	Following station
Marathon toward Los Angeles	Sunset Route	Del Rio toward New Orleans
Location

Sanderson station is an Amtrak railway station serving the small West Texas town of Sanderson. The unstaffed station is located alongside West Downie Street in the southwest corner of the town. The station accommodates travelers who use the combined Sunset Limited and Texas Eagle, operating between Los Angeles and New Orleans or Chicago, respectively.

== Service ==
The station sees six weekly arrivals, three in each direction. The westbound combined Sunset Limited and Texas Eagle stop at the station at around 8:30 am on Tuesday, Thursday and Sunday, while the eastbound train stops at about 10:30pm on Monday, Thursday and Saturday.

Sanderson is the least-used Amtrak stop in its national system, fewer than one boarding or alighting per train visit on average, attributed to the surrounding area's small population. In Amtrak's fiscal year 2025, total boardings and alightings were only 277 passengers.

== History ==
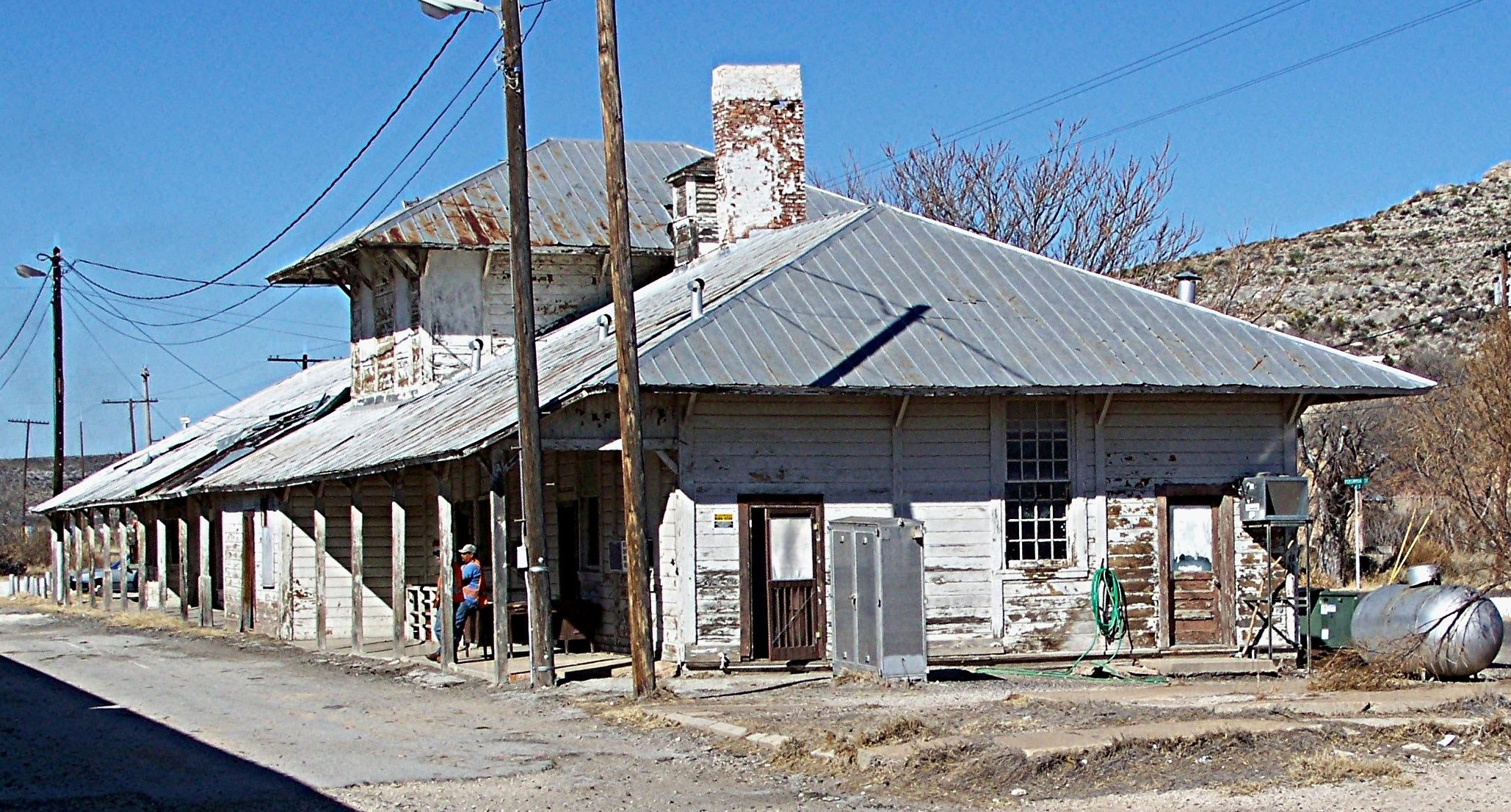
The now-demolished building in 2009

The stop was formerly the site of a Galveston, Harrisburg and San Antonio Railroad (GH&SA) depot, later owned by Southern Pacific and, eventually, Union Pacific. A large prefabricated clapboard wooden depot was assembled at the site in 1882 and expanded in 1910.

The east end of the depot included a lunchroom, a common feature in the days before dining cars became common. Trains would make a stop at Sanderson, where passengers could get off for a quick meal, before reboarding to continue their journeys. The restaurant also served as a community center in the early days of the town: a place where residents could meet for a meal or a cup of coffee.

Even after the decline of passenger rail travel, Sanderson's depot was still well used, serving as a crew change terminal for the Southern Pacific Railroad's freight trains. After the crew change point moved out of the town in 1995, the depot was abandoned and rapidly began to deteriorate. After Southern Pacific was purchased by Union Pacific, the new railroad owners quickly identified the depot as a candidate for demolition due to continuing maintenance costs. Local citizens advocated for rehabilitating or moving the historic depot but were unable to secure funding. The depot was demolished in October 2012.

For several years after the depot was demolished, only an Amtrak information sign remained at the site.

On May 27, 2021, a fully rebuilt station opened at the site. The $3 million project added an open-air shelter with a built-in bench to provide seating in the shade, a concrete platform, a concrete parking area, and concrete walkways. The entire station is fully in compliance with the Americans with Disabilities Act. The passenger shelter is built with a base of stone in gray and brown tones, from which rises a framework of massive timbers joined by metal connector plates to support the roof. Amtrak chose the shelter's rustic design to reflect the area's natural beauty, which includes habitat supporting a great variety of cacti.
