= Taylor station =

Amtrak train station in Taylor, Texas

Taylor, TX
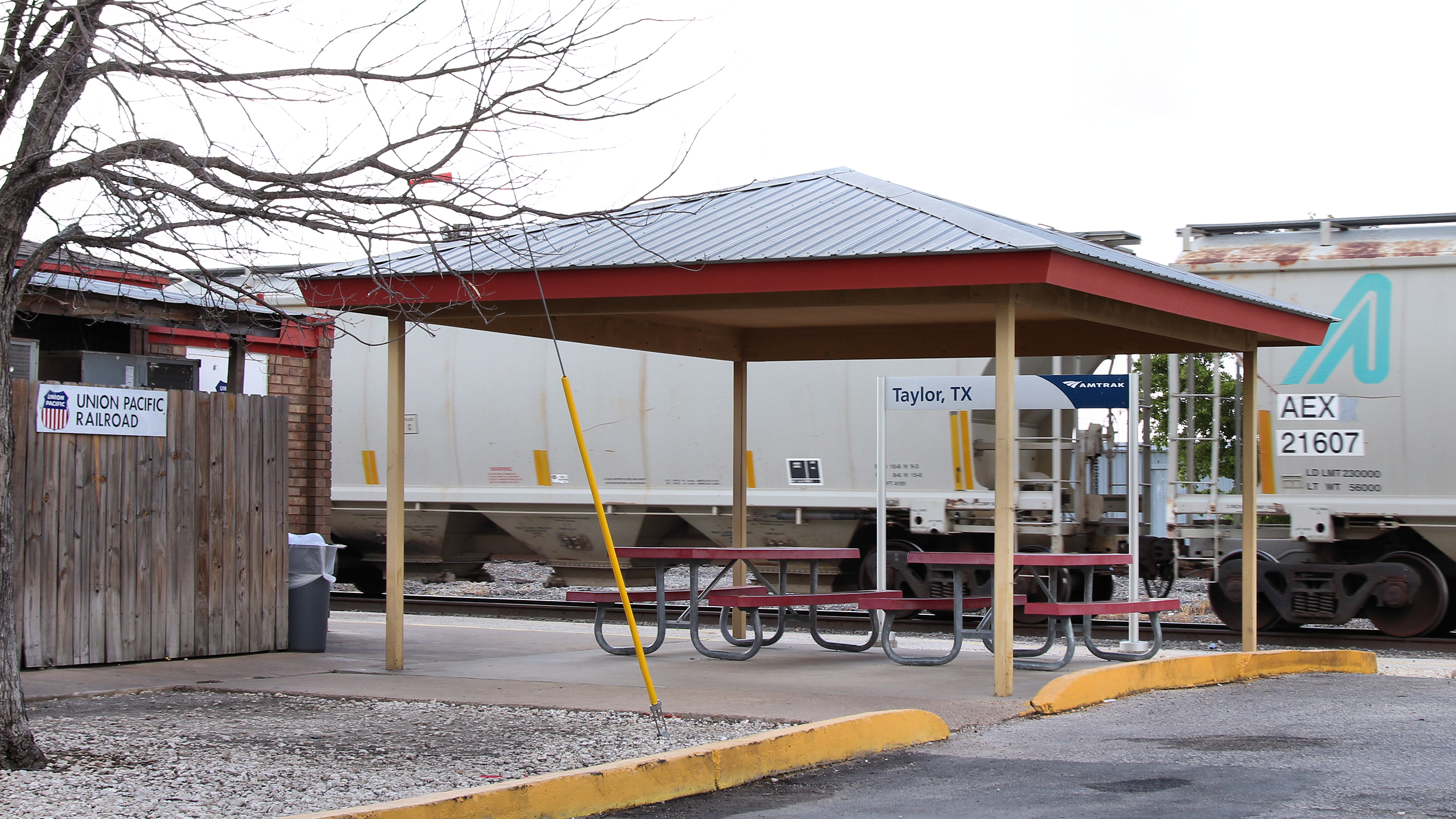

General information
- Location: 118 East First Street; Taylor, Texas; United States
- Coordinates: 30.56772°N 97.408°W
- Owner: Amtrak
- Line: Union Pacific Railroad
- Platforms: 1 side platform
- Tracks: 1

Other information
- Station code: Amtrak: TAY

History
- Opened: 1976

Passengers
- FY 2025: 6,210 (Amtrak)

Services
Preceding station	Amtrak	Following station
Austin toward Los Angeles or San Antonio	Texas Eagle	Temple toward Chicago
Former services
Preceding station	Amtrak	Following station
Austin toward Laredo	Inter-American	Temple toward Chicago
Location

Taylor station is a train station in Taylor, Texas, United States served by Amtrak, the national railroad passenger system. The unstaffed station consists of a small pavilion with picnic tables and shares a plot of land with a Union Pacific yard office. Amtrak service began in 1976 on a trail basis, with full station status granted in September 1978.
