= Alpine station =

Amtrak station in Alpine, Texas

Alpine, TX
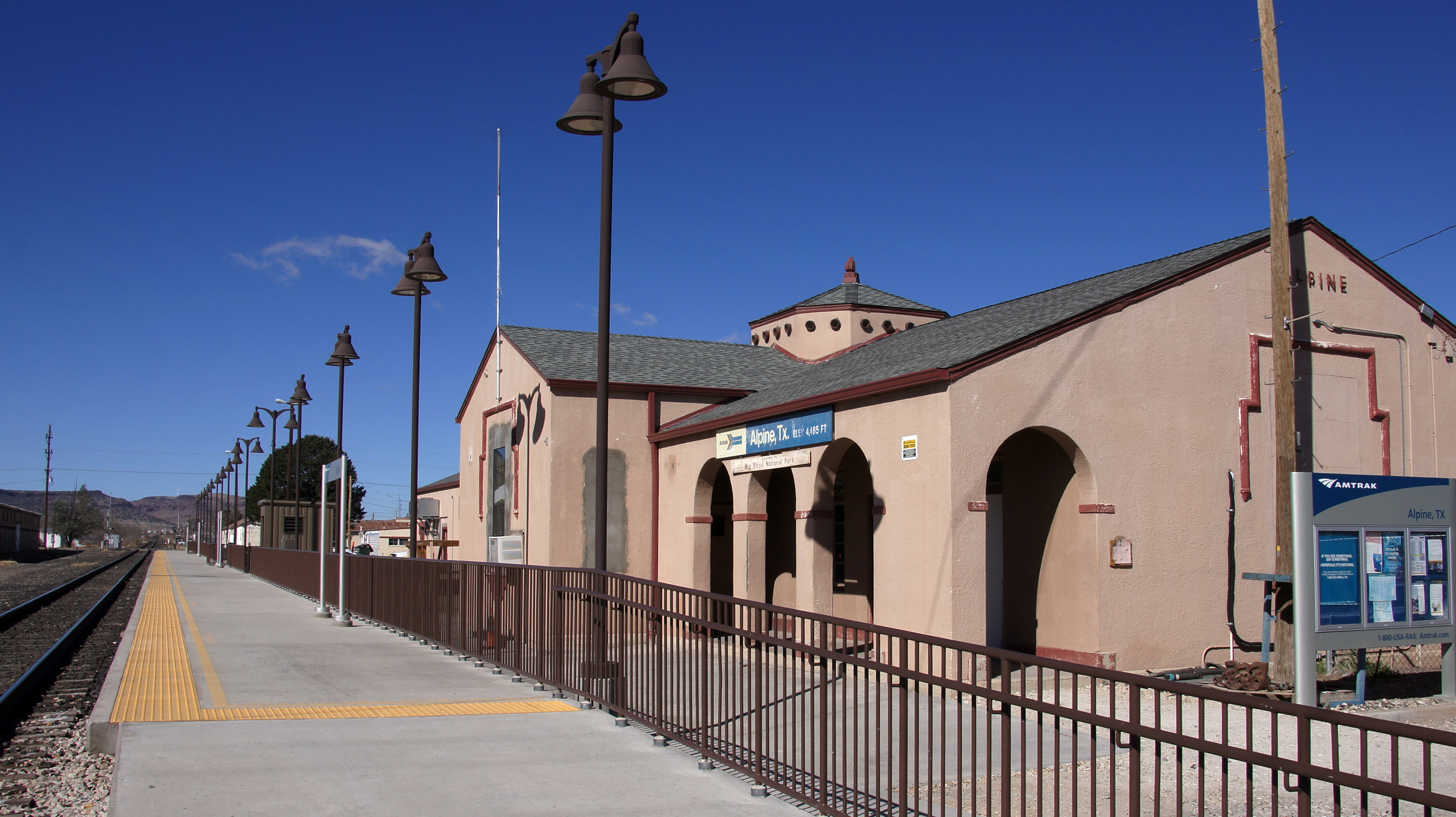
- Alpine station and platform

General information
- Location: 102 West Holland Street; Alpine, Texas; United States
- Coordinates: 30.35720°N 103.66168°W
- Line: UP Sanderson Subdivision
- Platforms: 1 side platform
- Tracks: 1

Other information
- Station code: Amtrak: ALP

History
- Opened: 1946

Passengers
- FY 2025: 4,207 (Amtrak)

Services
Preceding station	Amtrak	Following station
El Paso toward Los Angeles	Sunset Limited	Sanderson toward New Orleans
El Paso toward Los Angeles	Texas Eagle	Sanderson toward Chicago
Former services
Preceding station	Southern Pacific Railroad	Following station
Marfa toward Los Angeles	Sunset Route	Marathon toward New Orleans
Location

Alpine station is an Amtrak station in Alpine, Texas, served by the Sunset Limited and Texas Eagle routes. It is not staffed and has partial wheelchair accessibility, an enclosed waiting area, public payphones, and parking. It is located at 102 West Holland Street, is less than 1 mile (1.6 km) from Sul Ross State University, and is also the nearest station to Big Bend National Park.

== History ==
The depot, commissioned in 1946 by the Texas and New Orleans Railroad, was built in the Spanish Mission Revival style with light Art Deco detailing. The façade facing the tracks has a projecting center bay with a large window framed by geometric rope detailing. An octagonal cupola with a finial tops the building.

== Notable places nearby ==
- Big Bend National Park
- McDonald Observatory
- Sul Ross State University
