= Temple station (Texas) =

Train station in Temple, Texas

Temple, TX
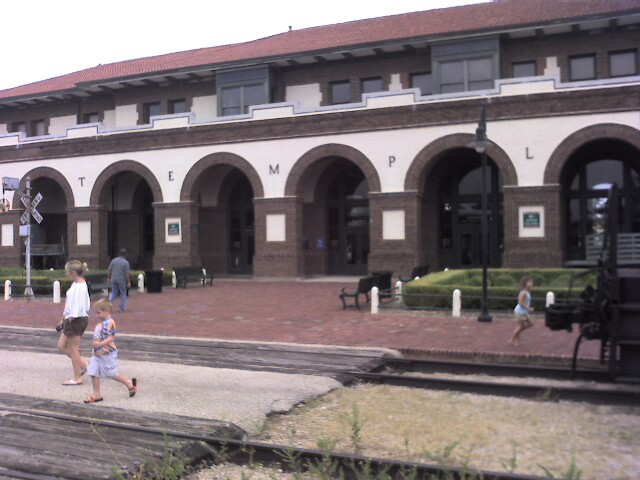

General information
- Location: 315 West Avenue B Temple, Texas; United States
- Coordinates: 31.09574°N 97.3452°W
- Owner: City of Temple
- Line: BNSF Railway
- Platforms: 1 side platform
- Tracks: 1
- Connections: Amtrak Thruway

Other information
- Station code: Amtrak: TPL

History
- Opened: 1911
- Rebuilt: 2000

Passengers
- FY 2025: 15,232 (Amtrak)

Services
Preceding station	Amtrak	Following station
Taylor toward Los Angeles or San Antonio	Texas Eagle	McGregor toward Chicago
Former services
Preceding station	Amtrak	Following station
Taylor toward Laredo	Inter-American	McGregor toward Chicago
Brenham toward Houston	Inter-American	McGregor toward Chicago
Brenham toward Houston	Lone Star	McGregor toward Chicago
Preceding station	Atchison, Topeka and Santa Fe Railway	Following station
Pendleton toward Purcell	Gulf, Colorado and Santa Fe Railway Main Line	Silenus toward Galveston
Belton toward San Angelo	San Angelo – Temple	Terminus
Location

Temple is a train station in Temple, Texas, United States served by Amtrak, the national railroad passenger system. The station was originally built as an Atchison, Topeka and Santa Fe Railway depot. East of the station on another railroad line through Temple, a former Missouri-Kansas-Texas Railroad depot can be found, as the nexus for trains bound for Waco, San Antonio and Houston.

== History ==
The first depot in Temple was in a boxcar. Later a two-story depot was built. In 1898 a Harvey House was built next to the depot. The current station was opened on January 29, 1911. Services included:

- Texas Chief (Chicago–Fort Worth–Galveston)
- California Special (west to Clovis, NM, Belen, NM, Los Angeles, CA) / Texan (east to Houston, and via Missouri Pacific Railway to New Orleans)
- services to Brownwood, and to Houston

In 1995, the city of Temple bought 8.5 acres of land around the station and the Santa Fe Railroad donated the building. In 1999, restoration work began on the depot and it was reopened on June 8, 2000.

The depot is currently home to the Temple Railroad and Heritage Museum and an Amtrak ticket office. The museum is open Monday through Saturday. The Amtrak office is open Monday through Saturday until the northbound Texas Eagle departs.

Next to the depot is the former Moody, Texas depot which is now home to the Central Texas Area Model Railroaders. Inside the depot is a model train layout which is open to the public on the first and fourth Saturday of each month.

North of Temple, the Texas Eagle is hosted by BNSF Railway; south of Temple, it uses the tracks of the Union Pacific Railroad. Temple station also provides Amtrak Thruway service to Killeen and Fort Cavazos, Texas.
