= Pennsylvania Railroad class K5 =

Class of American 4-6-2 locomotives

PRR K5
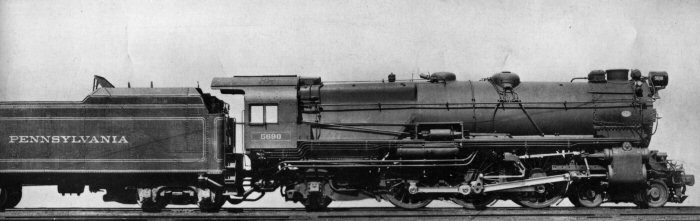
- Builder's photograph of Altoona-built K5, #5698.
Type and origin
- Power type: Steam
- Builder: #5698: PRR Altoona Works; #5699: Baldwin Locomotive Works
- Serial number: Altoona: 4205; Baldwin: 60660
- Build date: 1929
- Total produced: 2
- Rebuild date: 1937
- Number rebuilt: 1
Specifications
- Configuration
  - Whyte: 4-6-2
- Gauge: 4 ft 8 1/2 in (1,435 mm) standard gauge
- Driver dia.: 80 in (2.032 m)
- Adhesive weight: 208,250 lb (94,460 kg)
- Loco weight: 327,560 lb (148,580 kg)
- Tender type: 130-P-75
- Fuel type: Coal
- Fuel capacity: 22 short tons (20.0 t; 19.6 long tons)
- Water cap.: 12,475 US gal (47,220 L; 10,388 imp gal)
- Boiler pressure: 250 psi (1.7 MPa)
- Heating surface: 4,285 sq ft (398.1 m^{2})
- Superheater
  - Heating area: 1,634 sq ft (151.8 m^{2})
- Cylinders: 2
- Cylinder size: 27 in × 30 in (686 mm × 762 mm)
- Valve gear: #5698: Walschaerts; #5699: Caprotti, rebuilt to Walschaerts
- Valve type: Piston
Performance figures
- Maximum speed: 80–96 mph (129–154 km/h)
- Tractive effort: #5698: 54,675 lbf (243.21 kN); #5699: 58,092 lbf (258.41 kN) as built
- Factor of adh.: 3.8
Career
- Operators: Pennsylvania Railroad
- Class: K5
- Number in class: 2
- Numbers: 5698–5699
- Nicknames: Mussolini #5699
- Delivered: 1929
- Retired: 1952-1953
- Disposition: Both scrapped

The Pennsylvania Railroad's class K5 were experimental 4-6-2 "Pacific" locomotive types, built in 1929 to see if a larger Pacific than the standard K4s was worthwhile. Two prototypes were built, #5698 at the PRR's own Altoona Works, and #5699 by the Baldwin Locomotive Works. Although classified identically, the two locomotives differed in many aspects, as detailed below. They were both fitted with a much wider boiler than the K4s, but dimensionally similar to those of the I1s 2-10-0 "Decapods". Most other dimensions were enlarged over the K4s as well; the exceptions being the 70 ft^{2} (6.5 m^{2}) grate area and the 80 in (2.032 m) drivers.

In comparison:

	K4s	K5
Cylinders	27 in × 28 in (686 mm × 711 mm)	27 in × 30 in (686 mm × 762 mm))
Boiler pressure	205 psi (1.41 MPa)	250 psi (1.7 MPa)
Total heating surface	4,041 square feet (375.4 m^{2})	4,285 square feet (398.1 m^{2})
Superheating surface	943 square feet (87.6 m^{2})	1,634 square feet (151.8 m^{2})
Weight on drivers	201,830 pounds (91,550 kg)	208,250 pounds (94,460 kg)
Total weight	308,890 pounds (140,110 kg)	327,560 pounds (148,580 kg)
Tractive effort	44,460 lbf (197.8 kN)	54,675 lbf (243.21 kN)
Factor of adhesion	4.54	3.80

The K5's factor of adhesion was much worse than the K4s'. This is because the K5 was more powerful than the K4s but with little more weight on drivers (and thus adhesion). Factors of adhesion below 4 are often considered undesirable for steam locomotives, and the K5 design did prove to be rather less sure-footed because of it. For this reason, 4-8-2 "Mountain" and 4-8-4 "Northern" designs with more drivers (and thus a greater allowable weight on drivers within the same axle load limit) were generally considered preferable for locomotives as powerful as the K5.

Both K5 locomotives were given a 130-P-75 tender carrying 12,475 US gal (47,220 L; 10,388 imp gal) of water and 22 short tons (20.0 t; 19.6 long tons) of coal. Despite being such large locomotives built late in the steam era, both were equipped for hand firing. They were fitted with Worthington-pattern feedwater heaters, power reverse, unflanged main drivers, and both used nickel steel boiler shells. As built, both carried their bell on the smokebox front, hung below the headlight; this arrangement was common on other roads but at the time unique on the PRR.

== Altoona-built #5698 ==
K5 #5698 was built at the PRR's Juniata Works (Juniata 4205 / 1929) in 1929, but having a works plate Altoona Works 4205 / 1929. This according to late Mr Ivan W. Saunders, Pittsburgh, Pa. A one-piece cast steel locomotive bed was used; this produced the locomotive frame, cylinders, and smokebox saddle as one giant steel casting. This casting was produced by Commonwealth Steel's Granite City, Illinois plant. This cast locomotive bed design was a successful trial, and was repeated on 1930s order for 100 M1a class 4-8-2s, as was the Worthington feedwater heater with mixing chamber behind the stack.

K5 #5698 used conventional Walschaerts valve gear and piston valves, and developed a starting tractive effort of 54,675 lbf (243.21 kN).

During the New York World’s Fair of 1939-40, K5 5698 was displayed along with several other PRR locomotives at the fair. Following the fair, in 1941 it was modified with a smokebox extension and a different feedwater heater within. 5698 was again modified by 1948 with a new (one-piece) smokebox, new cylinders with outside steam pipes, and “modern” front end.

== Baldwin-built #5699 ==
In contrast, Baldwin-built #5699 (Baldwin 60660 / 1928) used a conventional, fabricated locomotive frame, longer smokebox with the feedwater mixing chamber in front of the stack and the generator mounted on the right side (below the stack), and separate cylinder plus half-saddle castings. The innovation trialled on #5699 was its use of Caprotti valve gear, a poppet valve gear invented in Italy. The greater efficiencies of this gear gave the locomotive a higher tractive effort of 58,092 lbf (258.41 kN).

Although efficient, the Caprotti gear proved less reliable than the regular Walschaerts valve gear and required more frequent, more skilled maintenance, and in 1937 it was replaced by Walschaerts gear driving regular piston valves, making the two locomotives (except for frames) functionally identical.

== Service life ==
The two locomotives were originally assigned to haul Philadelphia to Pittsburgh through trains. After the electrification reached Harrisburg, they were reassigned to the twisting Harrisburg–Baltimore route. Finally, they were reassigned to Pittsburgh–Crestline trains.

Both were updated after World War 2 with the standard front-end "beauty treatment" given to most K4s locomotives: a sheet-steel drop coupler pilot, higher-mounted headlight, and turbo-generator mounted on the smokebox front for easier access. They lost their unique bell placement at this time for a location equally unique for the PRR: under the generator-service platform on the front of the smokebox.

== Conclusion ==
Like many experimental locomotives, the K5 was only a qualified success. Both locomotives performed well enough to be kept in service, but not enough to persuade the PRR to build more. They proved that building a larger Pacific than the K4s was not worthwhile, as the reduced factor of adhesion limited the locomotives' ability to put their greater power to full use. A larger locomotive with eight driving wheels was needed.

This route was eventually taken by the T1 4-4-4-4 duplex locomotives, but the Great Depression and the large cost of electrification meant that PRR steam locomotive development effectively ceased after the K5 and M1a. The electrical department became the thrust of PRR locomotive policy, and the displaced steam locomotives from electrified territory gave the PRR a surplus of locomotives, giving little incentive to develop more.

The cast steel locomotive bed and Worthington feedwater heater both proved themselves, and they became a feature of most PRR steam locomotives built after the K5, and indeed those on many other railroads.

Both locomotives were scrapped.
