= M1A =

M1A may refer to:

- M1A (Istanbul Metro), a rapid transit line in Turkey
- McLaren M1A, a race car
- Springfield Armory M1A, a semi-automatic rifle
- Minsk (motorcycle) model M1A, a Belarusian motorcycle
- PRR M1a, Pennsylvania Railroad class M1a
