= Pennsylvania Railroad 5550 =

PRR T-1 class 4-4-4-4 locomotive under construction

Pennsylvania Railroad 5550 Dave Fink
- Artist's rendition of PRR 5550 when finished
Type and origin
- Power type: Steam
- Designer: Ralph P. Johnson; Raymond Loewy
- Builder: The T1 Trust
- Build date: 2014–Appx. 2030
Specifications
- Configuration
  - Whyte: 4-4-4-4
  - UIC: 2'BB2'h4S
- Gauge: 4 ft 8 1/2 in (1,435 mm)
- Leading dia.: 36 in (91 cm)
- Driver dia.: 80 in (203 cm)
- Trailing dia.: 42 in (107 cm)
- Wheelbase: 107 ft (33 m)
  - Engine: 51.92 ft (16 m)
  - Drivers: 25.33 ft (8 m)
  - Tender: 39 ft (12 m)
- Length: 122 ft 9 3/4 in (37 m)
- Width: 10 ft 0 in (3 m)
- Height: 15 ft 10 in (5 m)
- Frame type: Rigid
- Adhesive weight: 279,910 lb (126,965 kg)
- Loco weight: 502,200 lb (227,794 kg)
- Tender weight: 442,500 lb (200,715 kg)
- Total weight: 944,700 lb (428,509 kg)
- Tender type: Class 210-F-75A Tender
- Fuel type: Oil
- Fuel capacity: 62,000 lb (28,123 kg)
- Water cap.: 21,000 US gal (79,494 L)
- Firebox
  - Grate area: 92 sq ft (9 m^{2})
- Boiler
  - Diameter: 91 1/2 in (2 m) (front); 100 in (3 m) (back)
  - Tube plates: 214 13/16 in (5 m)
- Boiler pressure: 300 psi (2,068 kPa)
- Heating surface
  - Firebox: 490 sq ft (46 m^{2})
  - Total surface: 5,639 sq ft (523.9 m^{2})
- Superheater
  - Heating area: 1,430 sq ft (133 m^{2})
- Cylinders: Four
- Cylinder size: 19.75 in × 26 in (502 mm × 660 mm)
- Valve gear: Franklin Type B2 rotary-cam
- Valve type: Poppet
Performance figures
- Maximum speed: Approximately 130 mph (209 km/h)
Career
- Operators: Pennsylvania Railroad T1 Steam Locomotive Trust
- Class: Pennsylvania Railroad T1
- Number in class: 53 (52 built in the 20th Century, and 1 under construction)
- Numbers: PRR 5550
- Disposition: Under construction
- Estimated completion by 2030

Pennsylvania Railroad 5550, named Dave Fink, is a mainline duplex drive steam locomotive under construction in the United States. With an estimated completion by 2030, the locomotive will become the 53rd example of the Pennsylvania Railroad's T1 steam locomotive class and the only operational locomotive of its type, as well as the largest steam locomotive built in the United States since 1952 and the only existent duplex locomotive in the world. The estimated cost of PRR 5550 Dave Fink was originally $10 million, but an updated projected cost of $7 million was released with the acquisition of an existing long-haul tender from the Western New York Railway Historical Society in August 2017. Construction began in 2014 with the casting of the locomotive's keystone-shaped number plate. As of May 2026 the locomotive is 65.4% complete. The T1 Trust, the nonprofit constructing the locomotive, has so far completed all 8 driving wheels as well as the boiler, cab, keystone, frame and the cylinders.

== Introduction ==
=== The original T1 class ===
PRR #6110, one of two prototypes of the T1 class built for the Pennsylvania Railroad in 1942. The 50 production locomotives entered service in 1945 and 1946.

The Pennsylvania Railroad class T1 class steam locomotive was a unique and controversial class of locomotives. This was due to its unusual duplex drive 4-4-4-4 wheel arrangement, its use of the Franklin Type A oscillating-cam poppet valve, and its characteristic streamlining conceived by renowned industrial designer Raymond Loewy. The T1 was also the only class of Pennsylvania duplex able to travel the railroad's entire network and the first production series locomotive designed to use the poppet valve. The two prototype T1 locomotives were constructed in 1942 by the Baldwin Locomotive Works, numbered 6110 and 6111 respectively. Of the fifty production units, twenty-five (numbered 5500 to 5524) were constructed at the Pennsylvania Railroad's Altoona Works and twenty-five (numbered 5525 to 5549) at Baldwin, for a total of fifty-two T1 class locomotives. This made the T1 the most-produced of all the Pennsylvania Railroad's duplex-drive locomotives.

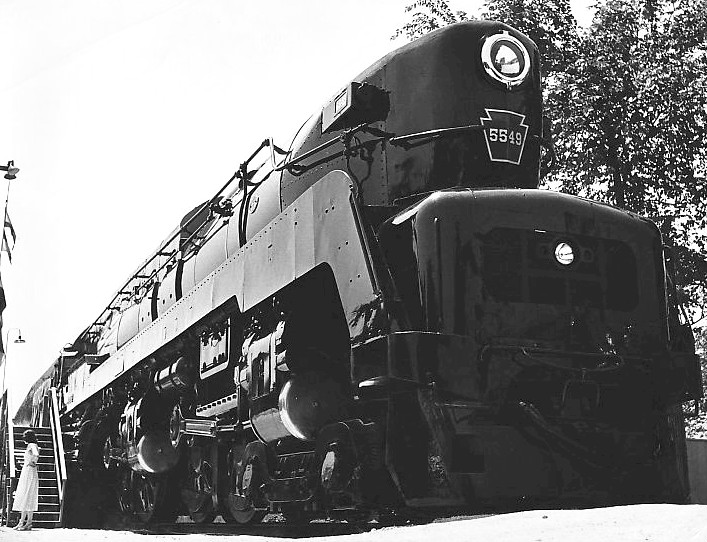
PRR #5549, a production series T1. 5549 was the last of the 27 T1s constructed by Baldwin.

The T1 class suffered from several performance and design issues, including difficulties with the poppet valves. The original materials used to construct the valves were subject to fatigue issues, particularly when the locomotives were operated above 100 miles an hour. When Franklin received complaints about this, they sent some of their employees on trains hauled by the T1. They timed the train between stations. The engineers apparently reported the T1 operating at speeds above 130 miles per hour. These speed timings resurfaced through interviews decades later. In 1947, a higher-strength and fatigue-resistant alloy was used and retrofitted to the T1 class to solve the fatigue problems. Nevertheless, the design of the Franklin Type A poppet valves made several key areas of the valves hard to access during maintenance overhauls. Despite these issues, the poppet valves did improve the T1's high-speed performance, requiring less horsepower and distributing steam flow with greater precision. The T1 locomotives were further burdened by excessive wheel slip on one of the two engine sets at startup or high speed. The Pennsylvania Railroad tried to address the problem by changing the spring bed arrangement on the T1—from a single bed, supporting all eight drivers, to two beds, each of which supported one of the engines and its adjacent truck. However, no complete solution was found to the problem of wheel slip, even though an "anti-slip" mechanism had been previously installed on the PRR Q2-class duplex. One possible reason is that the engineers, familiar with the slower throttle action of the K4 class, were unprepared for the T1's more immediate throttle response.

Before many of the problems that plagued the T1 class could be solved, the Pennsylvania Railroad decided to begin the transition from steam power to diesel. Moreover, these problems ensured that the T1 class would be retired before more reliable steam engine classes such as the K4s. The T1 locomotives were retired between 1952 and 1953. Scrapping began in 1953, and the last surviving T1 was scrapped in 1956. The hasty retirement of the T1 left several performance-related and technical questions unanswered.

=== The T1 Trust ===
The Pennsylvania Railroad T1 Steam Locomotive Trust, also referred to as the T1 Trust, is a non-profit public charity founded in 2013. The T1 Trust is composed of railroading experts who intend to build the 53rd member of the T1 class and put it into mainline steam excursion service within the United States. The last production T1 bore the number 5549, making 5550 the logical choice for the new locomotive's number. The T1 Trust's goal was to construct the locomotive within 17 years (by 2030) at an estimated cost of $10 million. The price is based on calculated costs for inflation, labor, material, fabrication, retooling, and design. Lessons learned during Tornado's construction in the U.K. were also taken into account. The T1 Trust chose to build a T1, rather than a proven design such as the New York Central Railroad's "J" class Hudsons, to test the T1 class's long-rumored performance and to avoid conflicts of interest with other locomotive replication projects.

=== World Steam Speed Record ===
The builders of PRR 5550 hope to break the world steam speed record, which is held by the LNER Class A4 4468 Mallard at 126 mph (203 km/h). The 5550 will operate under its original design with no major modifications in its attempt to break the record. It has been claimed that PRR T1 locomotives were capable of achieving speeds in excess of 140 mph (230 km/h) with lighter trains of six or seven cars, and the T1 Trust believes the original T1 design is capable of achieving this feat.

== Design and construction ==
=== Project leadership, techniques, and organization ===
The chairman of the T1 Trust is Bradford Noble, with Scott McGill the chief mechanical officer, Wes Camp the director of operations, and Jason Johnson the general manager. The project structure is similar to that used by the A1 Trust to accomplish the funding and construction of Tornado. To do this, the T1 Trust reached out to the UK-based A1 Trust and its engineering director, David Elliot, who gave important advice on organizational structure and engineering techniques to be used when critical information or blueprints regarding specific locomotive parts or needed materials are absent. Other UK-based organizations that are helping or working with the T1 Trust include the BR Class 8 Steam Locomotive Trust, the Caprotti Black 5 Limited and the P2 Steam Locomotive Company. The T1 Trust has sponsorship programs, where donors can choose to sponsor driving wheels or other parts of the locomotive as well as sponsoring blueprints. This along with occasional Kickstarter campaigns, regular monthly donations, one-time donations and membership for the Trust's "Founders Club" help raise the money necessary to construct the locomotive. The CMO of the Trust, Scott McGill, visited the Pennsylvania State Archives in Harrisburg, Pennsylvania, where he scanned hundreds of original drawings and blueprints of the Pennsylvania Railroad class T1 from the Pennsylvania Railroad collection into digital formats.

By November 2016, most of the scanning work had been completed with 1,638 of the 1,798 needed drawings and blueprints having been scanned and acquired by the T1 Trust. Only 150 of the drawings are missing from the collection, and these are composed mainly of simple fasteners and other readily-available, commercial components. The digitally-scanned drawings collected by the T1 Trust are used to create detailed and intricate 3D Models using the Dassault Systèmes SolidWorks computer aided drafting (CAD) program. For construction of the locomotive's many pieces and components, the T1 Trust contracts with different manufacturers and organizations such as the Strasburg Rail Road and Diversified Rail Services. The T1 Trust also prints a quarterly newsletter called the T1 Trail Blazer, which is received by members of the Trust's "Keystone Society": a group of donors that either pledge life income gifts to the Trust or pledge to list the Trust as an estate beneficiary. In September 2016, Doyle McCormack, a locomotive engineer best known for restoring and operating the GS-4 class 4-8-4 steam locomotive Southern Pacific 4449, joined the T1 Trust as a member of the organization's advisory board.

=== First signs of progress ===
Construction of PRR 5550 was officially started on May 31, 2014, with the completion of the locomotive's bronze keystone-shaped number plate, following a successful conclusion to the initial Kickstarter campaign launched by the Trust. The number plate was cast by traditional methods by a member of the T1 Trust, Chuck Blardone, at an Amish foundry within Lancaster County, Pennsylvania. This was followed by the construction of the first driving link pin, in October 2014. On May 2, 2014, the T1 Trust began meetings and discussions with the Federal Railroad Administration (FRA) to help ensure that PRR 5550 is constructed to FRA standards. The T1 Trust's application to the Internal Revenue Service (IRS) to operate as a federally approved tax-exempt 501(3)(c) charity was approved in July 2014. By March 2015, Steamtown National Historic Site, the Steam Railroading Institute (SRI) and the Cuyahoga Valley Scenic Railroad (CVSR) expressed interest to the T1 Trust to have the locomotive run on their premises. A part sponsor named Gary Bensman constructed the headlight of PRR 5550 in May 2015 and donated it to the T1 Trust. As a sign of gratitude, Bensman's name was engraved into the headlight by the Trust.

=== Wheelset and engine assembly ===
USATC 611, a USATC S160 Class steam locomotive, is currently the only surviving engine to be fitted with Franklin Type D Rotary Cam poppet valve, similar to what will be on PRR 5550. Note the large eccentric gear above the first two driving wheel sets, iconic to the Type B valve.

5550 is slated to use the Franklin Type B2 rotary-cam poppet valves in place of the Type A oscillating-cam poppets due to an increased ease of maintenance and superior performance. Although an unusual arrangement, it is not the first time the Type B poppets were used on a Pennsylvania Railroad class T1. In 1948, T1 number 5500 was rebuilt to use the Type B2 poppets following a damaging collision with a K4s in St. Louis, Missouri. Franklin Type B gear was applied to a handful of locomotives starting in 1948, including K4s 3847, which had been designed or built with conventional piston valves. Type B2 was devised specifically for the T1 as the existing valve arrangement from the Type A gear differed from Type B. 5500, perhaps the first locomotive fitted with two types of poppet valve gear, was soon noted for its superior performance over the other engines of its class. The Pennsylvania Railroad at one point even considered retrofitting the Type B2 poppets to other T1's, but this action was never taken. The Pennsylvania Railroad also experimented with the idea of fitting the T1 with conventional Walschaerts valve gear and retrofitted number 5547 to such a configuration.

To aid in the reconstruction of the Type B2 poppets, the T1 Trust was generously given full access to the USATC S160 Class 2-8-0 USATC No. 611 by Bill Miller Equipment Sales. USATC 611 is located along with its owner in Eckhart Mines, Maryland. USATC 611 was fitted with Franklin Type D rotary-cam poppet valves during the 1950s during its career at Fort Eustis, Virginia. The T1 Trust hopes to do a full inspection and documentation of key features within the Type D poppets to use as a basis for reconstructing the Type B2 poppets proposed for use on 5550. It is also hoped that the investigative work and documentation can aid a future restoration of USATC 611. The P2 Steam Locomotive Company is also using the Franklin Type B Rotary Cam poppet valve (albeit the earlier B1 model) for the underconstruction new build LNER Class P2 steam locomotive, No. 2007 Prince of Wales, and has shared valuable design documents with the T1 Trust needed to reproduce the valve. Components of the Caprotti valve gear will be examined to help recreate the gear box of the Type B2 poppet valve, as some of the original blueprints of the Type B2 gearbox have been lost. The copies of design documents and blueprints of the Caprotti gearbox were provided by the BR Class 8 Steam Locomotive Trust and Caprotti Black 5 Limited.

The number 7 and number 8 Boxpok driving wheels cast for PRR 5550, the first of their kind to be cast in the United States since the late 1940s.

The eight Boxpok driving wheels of the original T1's were 80 inches (2,032 mm) in diameter. This design is of a higher strength than conventional spoked driving wheels and is ideal for high-speed operations. On July 8, 2015, the T1 Trust launched a Kickstarter campaign titled "Let's Get Rolling" to raise $20,000, to be used in the design and building of a casting pattern for the new Boxpok drivers. The campaign reached over its goal and construction began on the casting patterns, which were finished in October 2015. Construction of the casting patterns was undertaken by Liberty Pattern in Youngstown, Ohio, using a complex CAD model made of PRR 5550's proposed number-four wheelset. Casting of the drivers was awarded to Beaver Valley Alloy in Monaca, Pennsylvania On February 26, 2016, Beaver Valley Alloy cast the first of eight driving wheels at its foundry successfully. This historic event marked the first time a steam locomotive driving wheel had been cast in the United States since the 1940s. As of May 2024, seven of the locomotive's eight drive wheels have been completed.

=== Aluminum components ===
The cab of the locomotive is of aluminum construction. This is not a new feature, as the cabs of the previous T1s were also made of aluminum, which was done to reduce weight. The streamlining of the locomotive, like the cab, also consists of aluminum construction. Digitization of the original cab blueprints was undertaken by JAKTOOL in Cranbury, New Jersey. On January 18, 2017, the frames and main components of the cab were cut by Gemini Industrial Machine in Dover, Ohio, beginning construction of the cab. Construction of the cab was contracted to Curry Rail Services in Hollidaysburg, Pennsylvania. By coincidence, the facility currently housing Curry Rail Services was previously the Pennsylvania Railroad's Samuel Rea Car Shops. The cab was completed on July 10, 2017, albeit unpainted.

The prow of PRR 5550, as completed in May 2017, featuring the keystone number plate and headlight

Construction on the "prow" portion of the locomotive's streamlining, also made of aluminum, began on November 10, 2016, by Gemini Industrial Machine. This part of the structure houses the headlight and keystone number plate. Using existing CAD models, a water jet cutter, bodywork, fabrication and paint, the prow was completed on May 16, 2017, with the headlight and keystone number plate attached.

=== Locomotive frame ===
The locomotive frame began construction at a Dover, Ohio-based fabrication shop in 2024. On May 1, 2025 the Trust announced that it was now complete.

This was the most complicated component and described as the "lynchpin" of the entire locomotive as everything bolts to it: the boiler bolts to it and the wheel cannon boxes come up into the pedestal jaws. The 5550 frame is designed to have a buff strength exceeding FRA requirements for durability and running at high speed on 4 cylinders. Steam era calculations were revived to deal with yawing from reciprocating cylinders. As of October 2025 the four cylinders were being fabricated and attached to the frame.

=== Boiler ===
On January 26, 2018, the T1 Trust announced it had ordered the first and second courses of the massive boiler. The courses were the largest parts of PRR 5550 ordered at that point. The design of 5550's boiler was handled by the T1 Trust's boiler engineering team, led by Wolf Fengler. Others working on the design of the boiler included Trust members Gary Bensman, Dave Griner, Scott McGill and Jason Johnson. The team re-engineered the T1 boiler and firebox design to exceed current ASME standards and codes. In December 2019, the Trust officially launched a campaign to raise the necessary $150,000 to build the firebox.

The first two sections of the boiler were constructed from 1 inch (25 mm) thick boiler code steel and are 93 inches (2.4 m) in diameter and 12 feet (3.7 m) in length. The sections were welded and included openings for water refilling along with washout plugs. The order was placed with Continental Fabricators in St. Louis, which had previous experience constructing boilers for other steam locomotives, such as Southern Railway 401 and Chicago and North Western 1385. On June 15, 2018, the third boiler course was completed and welded to the first two.

In 2020, the full boiler was completed and welded together. The smokebox, smokebox streamlining, and combustion chamber have also been completed. These components were joined along with the prow by the end of 2020.

In May 2025 the Trust announced that final assembly of 5550 will begin when the boiler is joined to the frame at a newly constructed restoration shop at the Dennison Railroad Depot Museum in Dennison, Ohio. As of November 2026 the building plans were under review and construction is anticipated to begin in 2027.

=== Tender ===
On August 7, 2017, the T1 Trust purchased the sole surviving "Coast to Coast" 16-wheeled tender from the Western New York Railway Historical Society for eventual use on PRR 5550. According to the Trust, the purchase of said tender reduces the overall cost of the project by at least $3,000,000 US. The tender, No. 6659, was originally thought to have been built for an M1 class 4-8-2 Mountain type locomotive. Upon conducting further research, the Trust found that it was built as an auxiliary coast-to-coast tender and was not assigned to any specific locomotive. This, and its use as a fuel tank for the track department, likely contributed to it being saved. Prior to the sale, the Historical Society planned to display the tender behind PRR 4483, an I1sa class 2-10-0 locomotive. Currently, the tender sits in North Collins, New York. The Trust agreed to help restore the tender currently paired with the Historical Society's I1sa as part of the M1 tender purchase agreement. The Trust plans to perform a mandatory test of the tender's brake system, restore the brake systems, replace the oil in the roller bearings, and move the tender to Hamburg, New York for repainting and final restoration. To help fund the tender restoration, the Trust has created a separate donation fund for this task and will display the names of all donors who pledge $500 or higher to the fund on a bronze plaque placed upon the tender itself. The total cost of the tender restoration is estimated to be more than $50,000. On October 5, 2017, an automatic coal stoker was donated to the Trust. The motor, coal crusher, gearbox, stoker trough, and reversing valve were donated by Gary Bensman and Warren Lathom.

=== Project milestones ===
- 2013: The Pennsylvania Railroad T1 Steam Locomotive Trust is founded.
- 2013: The T1 Trust begins scanning original blueprints and documents of the Pennsylvania Railroad at the Pennsylvania State Archives.
- 2014: The keystone shaped number plate is cast starting the construction of PRR 5550, April 3.
- 2014: 501(c)(3) status is granted to the T1 Trust by the IRS, July 3.
- 2014: Work starts on the Boxpok driver center casting patterns, December 14.
- 2015: The headlight for PRR 5550 is constructed and donated by parts donor Gary Bensman.
- 2015: "Let's Get Rolling" Kickstarter campaign launched to fund the casting of the first Boxpok driver, July 8. The campaign is completed on August 7, raising $2,577 over the intended $20,000 goal.
- 2015: Boxpok driver center casting patterns completed, October 22.
- 2016: First Boxpok driver is cast, February 26.
- 2016: Construction of the locomotive prow begins.
- 2016: Scanning of PRR original blueprints and documents nears completion, November.
- 2016: Second Boxpok driver is ordered, December 9.
- 2017: Construction of the locomotive cab begins, January 18.
- 2017: Second Boxpok driver is cast, March 6.
- 2017: Prow completed with headlight and number plate installed, May 16.
- 2017: Cab completed but left unpainted, July 10.
- 2017: Tender purchased from Western New York Railway Heritage Society, August 7.
- 2017: PRR 5550 is estimated to be 28.1% complete, August 7.
- 2017: All necessary parts for an automatic coal stoker are donated to the Trust, October 5.
- 2018: The first and second sections of the boiler are ordered on January 26 and 28, respectively.
- 2018: $5,000 Grant awarded to the T1 Trust by the Tom E. Daily Foundation for Tender brake work, February 3.
- 2018: First and second boiler sections are completed and welded together, March 6.
- 2018: The third section of the boiler is ordered, May 4.
- 2018: The third boiler section is completed and welded into place, June 15.
- 2019: The front flue sheet is ordered, March 24.
- 2019: The smokebox and extension are ordered, December 16.
- 2020: The Trust holds its first open house at Gemini Industries, March 7.
- 2020: The smokebox and extension are added to the boiler and work on the firebox commences.
- 2020: A Trust supporter challenges the organization's followers to raise $50,000, to be matched dollar-for-dollar if the amount is reached by the end of the year. Just under $60,000 is raised before December 31.
- 2025: Fabrication of the locomotive frame was completed on May 1. Dennison, Ohio was announced as the final assembly site on May 16.
- 2026: Cylinders were being welded onto the frame by June. The name was announced as "Dave Fink", after a former PRR clerk and the President of Pan Am Railways. Estimate was 65.4% complete.

The project is 65.4% complete as of May 2026, with an estimated completion date of 2030.

== Anticipated operation ==
Economic, regulatory, and liability considerations required that the Trust make some changes compared to the PRR's operation of the T1. The locomotive will burn oil rather than coal and have multiple-unit compatibility with diesel locomotives. It will also have a modern 26-L braking system and a wheel-slip alarm. Though capable of operating on the main line, it would not be economical to do so and will likely operate up to 40 mph (64 km/h) on branch lines. The Trust also plans to equip the locomotive with a positive train control (PTC) system.

== See also ==
- LNER Peppercorn Class A1 60163 Tornado
- LMS-Patriot Project
- GWR 6800 Class 6880 Betton Grange
- Steam locomotives of the 21st century
- Duplex locomotive
