= 2-4-6-2 =

Locomotive wheel arrangement

A 2-4-6-2 steam locomotive, in the Whyte notation for describing locomotive wheel arrangements, has a two-wheel leading truck, one set of four driving wheels, one set of six driving wheels, and a two-wheel trailing truck.

Other equivalent classifications are:
UIC classification (also known as German classification): 1BC1
French classification: potentially 1231, although the only example was described as 151

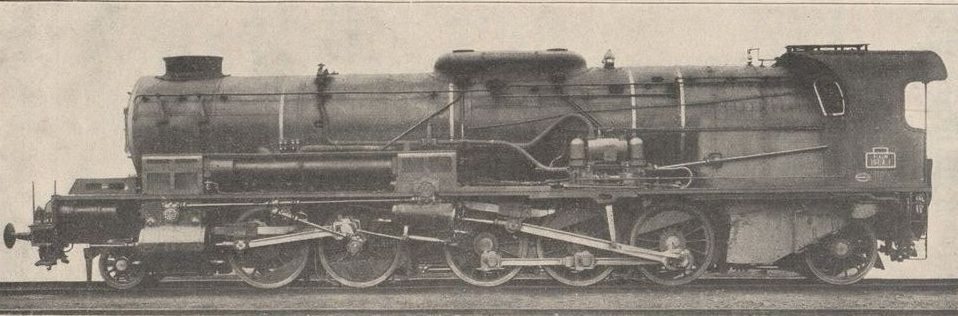
The 151 A of the PLM

This most unusual wheel arrangement was only ever used on the PLM 151.A class, a French duplex locomotive type built in 1932 for the PLM. Although a rigid locomotive, not articulated, it had some similarities to a Mallet as it was a compound with the two groups of drivers driven by the high pressure cylinders for the rear 6-coupled group and the low pressure for the front 4-coupled group. As the two groups of drivers were also linked with inside coupling rods through inside cranks on the second and third drivers, André Chapelon considered that this made the locomotive a 2-10-2 rather than a duplex, which was also consistent with the PLM numbering as 151. Linking the drivers did not transfer appreciable power between them, but it did keep them synchronised in phase, so that the pistons moved as a balanced locomotive. Power from each pair of cylinders was shared in the ratio 2:3 to distribute power equally across each wheelset.

The compound locomotives were built to haul heavy freight trains on the 0.8% grade of the Paris–Marseille railway between Les Laumes and Dijon. Their performance was so good that the company wanted to order more engines, but the nationalization of the French railways in 1938 stopped all projects. These duplex engines were fitted with Lenz-Dabeg rotary cam valve gear and soon thereafter with double chimneys. The driving wheels had a diameter of 1.50 m (4 ft 11 in). The highest permissible speed was 53 mph (85 km/h). In a test on 19 December 1933, the engine developed slightly more than 3,000 hp (2,200 kW) at the drawbar over a distance of 37 miles (60 km) and a speed of at least 46 mph (74 km/h), without being overworked. In ordinary service these engines could haul 1,375 short tons (1,228 long tons; 1,247 t), sustaining 31 mph (50 km/h) at the summit of the 0.8% Blaisy grade. After electrification of the line, the 151A's were sent for service in northeastern France. They were withdrawn from service in 1956 and scrapped.
