= Baltimore and Ohio class N-1 =

Steam locomotive

B&O #5600 George H. Emerson
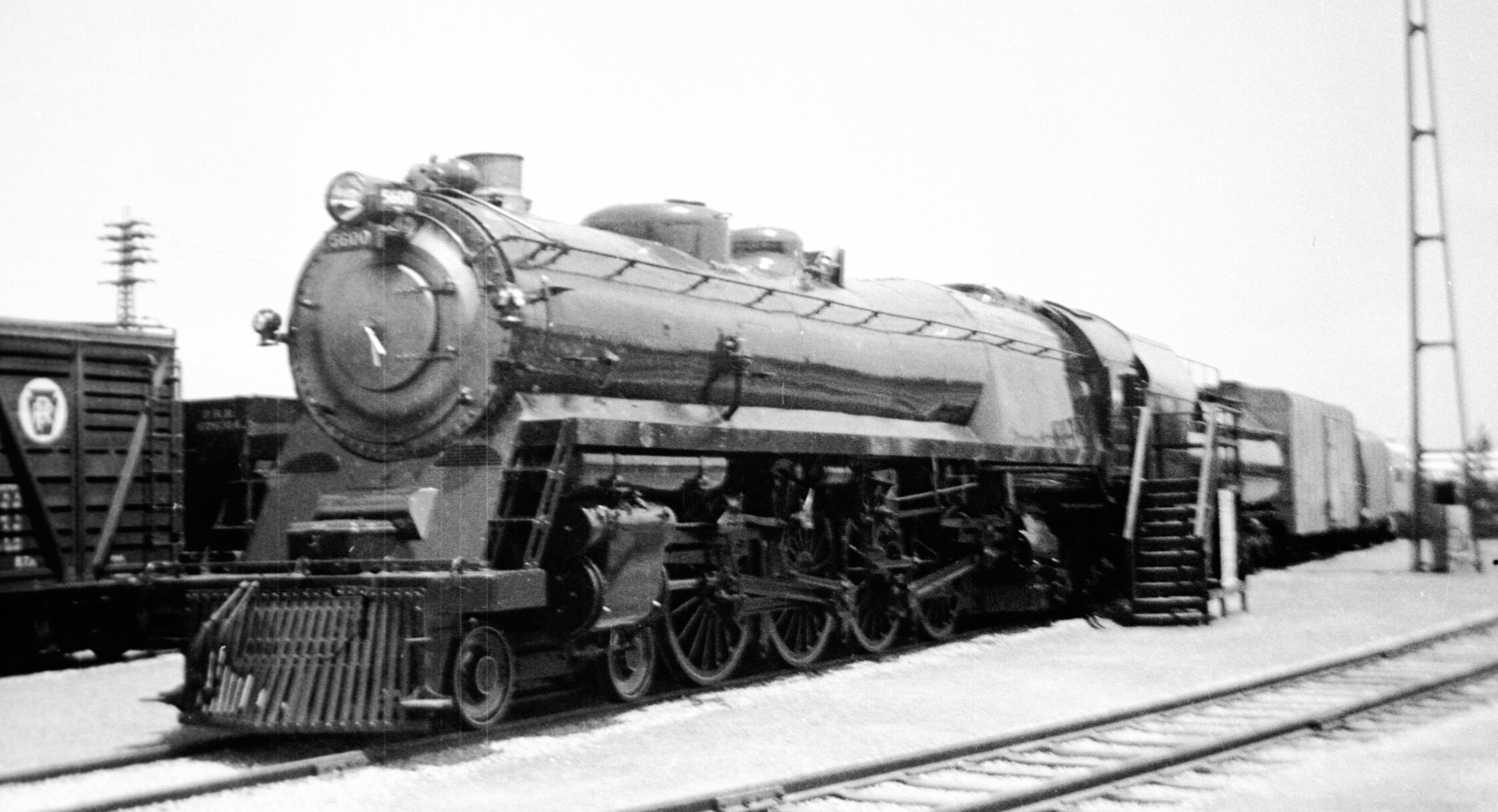
- Baltimore and Ohio Railroad #5600 George H. Emerson at the 1939 New York World's Fair.
Type and origin
- Power type: Steam
- Builder: B&O Mount Clare Shops
- Build date: May 1937
- Total produced: 1
Specifications
- Configuration
  - Whyte: 4-4-4-4
  - UIC: 2′BB2′
- Gauge: 4 ft 8 1/2 in (1,435 mm) standard gauge
- Leading dia.: 36 in (914 mm)
- Driver dia.: 76 in (1,930 mm)
- Trailing dia.: 42 in (1,067 mm)
- Minimum curve: 13° or 441.68 ft (134.62 m) normal, 18° or 319.62 ft (97.42 m) slow
- Length: 117 ft 0 1/4 in (35.67 m)
- Adhesive weight: 238,000 lb (108,000 kilograms; 108 metric tons)
- Loco weight: 386,500 lb (175,300 kilograms; 175.3 metric tons)
- Tender weight: 350,000 lb (160,000 kilograms; 160 metric tons)
- Total weight: 736,500 lb (334,100 kilograms; 334.1 metric tons)
- Tender type: Vanderbilt with two 3-axle trucks
- Fuel type: Coal
- Fuel capacity: 46,000 lb (21,000 kilograms; 21 metric tons)
- Water cap.: 22,000 US gal (83,000 L; 18,000 imp gal)
- Firebox
  - Grate area: Unknown
- Boiler pressure: 350 lbf/in^{2} (2.41 MPa)
- Heating surface
  - Firebox: 677 sq ft (62.9 m^{2})
  - Tubes and flues: 4,220 sq ft (392 m^{2})
  - Total surface: 4,897 sq ft (454.9 m^{2})
- Superheater
  - Type: B&O
  - Heating area: 1,312 sq ft (121.9 m^{2})
- Cylinders: Four, duplex
- Cylinder size: 18 in × 26.5 in (457 mm × 673 mm)
- Valve gear: Walschaerts
Performance figures
- Power output: 3,936 hp (2,935 kW) at cylinders
- Tractive effort: 65,000 lbf (289.1 kN)
- Factor of adh.: 3.66
Career
- Operators: Baltimore and Ohio Railroad
- Class: N-1
- Numbers: 5600
- Official name: George H. Emerson
- Retired: 1943
- Scrapped: October 1950

The Baltimore and Ohio class N-1 steam locomotive, #5600 (named "George H. Emerson"), was the first duplex locomotive and the first 4-4-4-4 locomotive ever built. It was unique in the fact that it had a water tube firebox, which was much larger than a normal firebox. It was designed and built by the railroad's own shops in 1937.

== History ==
=== Construction and design ===
B&O #5600 was designed and built by the Baltimore and Ohio Railroad's own Mount Clare Shops in May 1937.

The rear set of cylinders were placed beside the firebox. This allowed the locomotive's wheelbase to remain the same. The space beside the firebox was hot and dirty, which caused premature cylinder wear, and the placement of the cylinders limited the size of the firebox.

These same problems occurred on the PRR Q1, which also placed the rear cylinders by the firebox. It was built by the B&O's own Mount Clare Shops in 1937; however, it had problems with the sizes of the cylinders facing the other direction.

=== Retirement ===
No. 5600 was withdrawn in 1943 and scrapped in 1950.

== Gallery ==
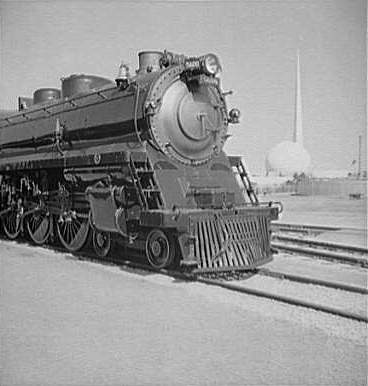
B & O 5600 at the 1939 New York World's Fair

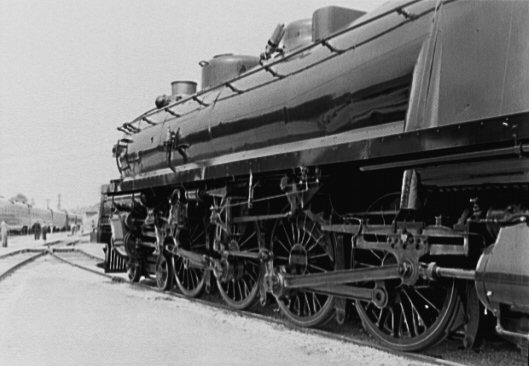
Detail, showing the rearward cylinders and gear

== Bibliography ==
- Reed, Brian (June 1972). Pennsylvania Duplexii. Loco Profile 24. Windsor, Berkshire: Profile Publications Limited. pp. 266–267.
- Morrison, Tom (2018-07-24). The American Steam Locomotive in the Twentieth Century. McFarland. pp. 403–405. ISBN 978-1-4766-2793-9.
