= 4-4-4-4 =

Duplex locomotive wheel arrangement

- Front of locomotive at left

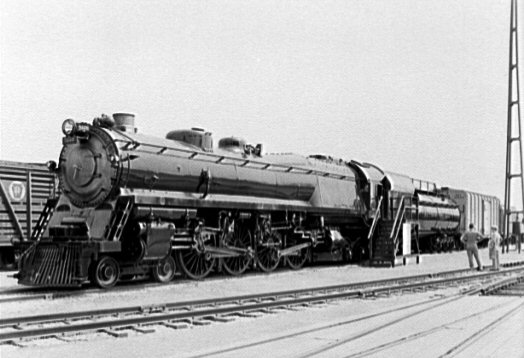
- The Baltimore and Ohio Railroad's #5600 George H. Emerson.
Equivalent classifications
- UIC class: 2'BB2'
- French class: 2222
- Turkish class: 2424
- Swiss class: 4/8
- Russian class: 2-2-2-2
First known tender engine version
- First use: May 1937
- Country: United States
- Locomotive: B&O Class N-1
- Railway: Baltimore and Ohio Railroad
- Designer: Baltimore and Ohio Railroad
- Builder: Mount Clare Shops
- Benefits: Decreased wheelbase
- Drawbacks: Premature cylinder wear, cylinder clogging and restricted firebox size
First known "True type" version
- First use: April 1942
- Country: United States
- Locomotive: PRR class T1
- Railway: Pennsylvania Railroad
- Designer: Ralph P. Johnson; Raymond Loewy
- Builder: Baldwin Locomotive Works; Altoona Works
- Evolved from: 4-8-4
- Benefits: Better high speed performance
- Drawbacks: Wheel slip

A 4-4-4-4 steam locomotive, in the Whyte notation for describing locomotive wheel arrangements, has a four-wheel leading truck, two sets of four driving wheels, and a four-wheel trailing truck. While it would be possible to make an articulated locomotive of this arrangement, the only 4-4-4-4s ever built were duplex locomotives—with two sets of cylinders driving two sets of driven wheels in one rigid frame, essentially a 4-8-4 with divided drive.

== History ==
=== 20th century ===
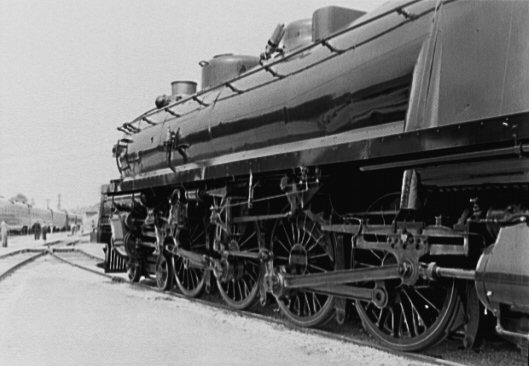
Rearward cylinders and gear of the sole N-1

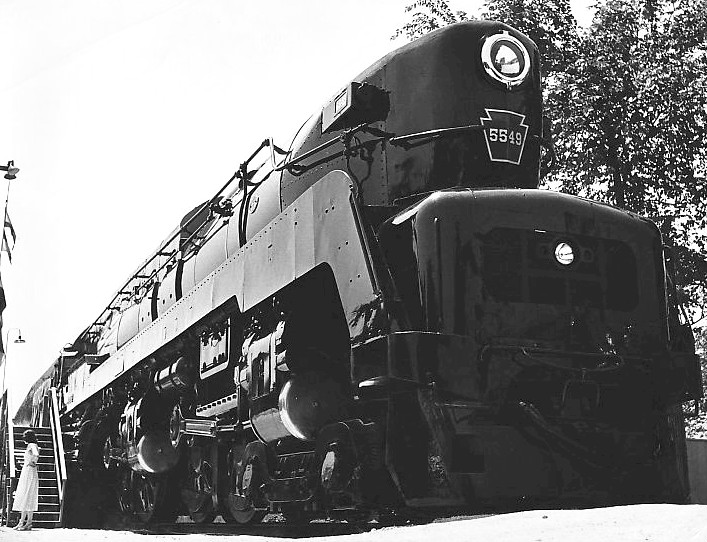
The Pennsylvania Railroad's class T1 duplex locomotive

The first locomotive built with this arrangement was the Baltimore and Ohio Railroad's sole class N-1 #5600 George H. Emerson, constructed at the B&O's own Mount Clare Shops in May 1937. To reduce the fixed wheelbase, this locomotive had the two sets of cylinders at opposite ends, so that the rear pair were beside the firebox. The firebox was an unconventional water tube design which was tested well on other locomotives and needed a large space. The 4-4-4-4 wheel arrangement proved to be a poor design, as it restricted the firebox size and exposed the cylinders to dust and dirt, causing premature wear. The locomotive was not considered successful enough to duplicate. The sole N-1 was retired in 1943 and scrapped in 1950.

The next locomotives to use the 4-4-4-4 arrangement were the Pennsylvania Railroad's 52 class T1 locomotives (although the single class S1 was originally intended to be a 4-4-4-4, it was later changed to 6-4-4-6 due to increased weight). These had the cylinders in front of the wheels they drove, so that the rear pair were between the two sets of drivers. These locomotives were impressive performers but suffered from wheelslip and severe reliability problems, and did not last long in service.

The two prototypes, #6110 and #6111, were constructed at the Baldwin Locomotive Works in April 1942. The mechanical design work had been undertaken by Baldwin's chief engineer Ralph P. Johnson, while the streamlining was the handiwork of industrial designer Raymond Loewy. Both locomotives showed fantastic performance in test trials, leading to the construction of 50 further examples. Numbers 5500 through 5524 would be constructed at the PRR's Altoona Works while 5525 through 5549 would be constructed at Baldwin.

As operation continued, problems arose. The T1 class was known for violent uncontrollable wheel slip as well as performance and maintenance issues caused by the Franklin oscillating-cam Poppet valves. The PRR did show interest in trying to solve these problems such as replacing the original poppets on #5500 with easier to maintain Franklin rotary-cam poppet valves and refitting #5547 with Walschaerts valve gears reclassifying the latter engine as a "T1a".

The PRR decided to stop development of the T1 class, replacing all examples by the mid-1950s with diesel units. All members of the class were scrapped. It is very likely the T1 may have had many of its shortcomings solved had the PRR not retired the short-lived class so soon. During its short service life, the T1 was rumored to have operated at higher speeds than the steam speed record set by the London and North Eastern Railway's Mallard, but the claims could not be officially verified.

Several bush tramway engine types were built with this wheel arrangement. These were known as "16-Wheelers". Two notable New Zealand-based builders were J. Johnson and Sons Ltd. in Invercargill and A&G Price in Thames.

=== 21st century ===
Only one locomotive of the 4-4-4-4 arrangement is being constructed. When finished, PRR 5550 will be the 53rd and only surviving example of the PRR T1 class rather than a replica. The new build T1 is expected to implement some design improvements to help aid in solving problems encountered by the original 52. The estimated date of project completion is currently set to be around 2030. As of November 2023, the project is 43.3% complete with an estimated total cost of US $7,000,000.
