= Duplex locomotive =

Type of steam locomotive

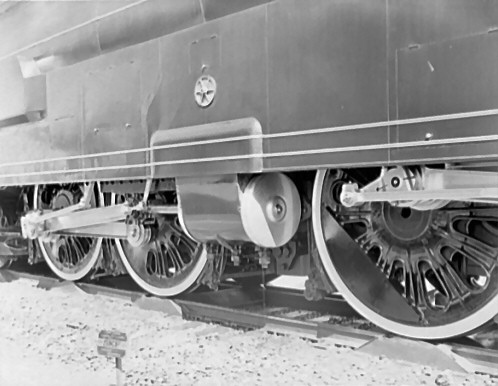
Closeup of the second set of cylinders on the Pennsylvania Railroad class S1.

A duplex locomotive is a steam locomotive that divides the driving force on its wheels by using two pairs of cylinders rigidly mounted to a single locomotive frame; it is not an articulated locomotive. The concept was first used in France in 1863, but was particularly developed in the early 1930s by the Baldwin Locomotive Works, the largest commercial builder of steam locomotives in North America, under the supervision of its then chief engineer, Ralph P. Johnson.

Prior to this, the term duplex locomotive was sometimes applied to articulated locomotives in general.

== Technical concept ==
The main disadvantage of the two-cylinder locomotives is the heavy hammer blow on the rails caused by the attempt to balance the reciprocating parts with additional masses mounted in the wheels. This effect can be reduced by using multiple cylinders acting on more drive wheels.

In Europe this problem was often overcome by dividing the drive between inside and outside cylinders, or else by using articulated locomotives, although at the time it was not believed possible to run one stably at greater than 50 mph (80 km/h). American railroads generally proved to be unwilling to use locomotives with inside cylinders, so the problem of balance could not be solved by adding more cylinders per coupled wheel set. As locomotives got larger and more powerful, their reciprocating machinery had to get stronger and thus heavier, and thus the problems posed by imbalance and hammer blow became more severe. Speed also played a factor, since the forces became greater and more destructive at higher wheel speeds. Ralph P. Johnson thought that the growing size and piston thrusts of existing express passenger locomotives could not be sustained with the by-then conventional 4-8-4 two-cylinder layout. In addition, he became convinced that a single pair of cylinders with conventional valve gear and piston valves was approaching the limits in terms of steam flow.

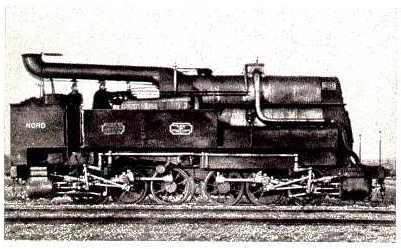
0-6-6-0T duplex locomotive built by Jules Petiet in 1863

The earliest attempt at duplex locomotive was an 0-6-6-0 tank locomotive designed by Jules Petiet in 1863 for the French Northern Railway, but the idea was not perpetuated. However, the innovation of more rigid hinges that permitted only horizontal swinging movements and not twisting or vertical movement was from ALCO, and not seen until 1936's Union Pacific Challenger.

Instead came the idea of having multiple groups of cylinders and driven wheels mounted in one rigid frame. A "duplex" version of a 4-8-4 would be a 4-4-4-4, with the eight driving wheels split into two groups of four, each with its own set of cylinders and valve gear. The reciprocating mass of both sets would be substantially less than the single set on the 4-8-4, since they would be under less stress and gentler piston thrusts. The cylinders could be smaller yet have larger, more efficient valves. The most obvious tradeoff was that, in Baldwin's proposed design, the rigid wheelbase was longer since the second set of cylinders had to be between the two sets of drivers. A solution to this was placing the second set after the second set of driven wheels facing forward, instead of ahead of them and facing rearward like the first set of cylinders. This had its own complications, and the challenges were sufficiently concerning for many roads, for whom current locomotives were taxing enough, to reject the duplex idea.

== Duplex locomotives ==
As of 2025, none of the duplex locomotives listed below survive. Their success and whether they could have been made to work well with sufficient time and effort is still debated. A common conclusion is that the problems of the conventional steam locomotive were not as insolvable as Baldwin believed, and that the duplex arrangement created almost as many problems as it solved. However, a group of enthusiasts is in the process of building a new Pennsylvania Railroad class T1 duplex locomotive, using design improvements from the post-war steam era in the hope of achieving better performance characteristics.

=== Baltimore and Ohio class N-1 #5600 George H. Emerson ===
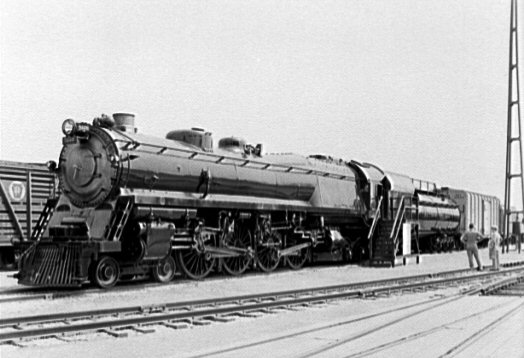
The sole example of the N-1 class.

The first road to use the idea was the Baltimore and Ohio Railroad, which rejected a Baldwin proposal in 1932–33, but then constructed the single Baltimore and Ohio Class N-1, #5600 George H. Emerson in the railroad's own shops without Baldwin's assistance. The locomotive was completed in May 1937 and managed to retain the same coupled wheelbase as the road's current 4-8-2s by having the second set of cylinders reversed, mounted alongside the firebox, and driving the second set of coupled wheels forwards. This proved to be less than ideal, the size of the cylinders and firebox both being constrained by this location, the long steam passages proving problematic, and the cylinders suffering from the dust and heat of the nearby firebox.

The locomotive was in light service and tested until withdrawal in 1943. It was not successful enough for the B&O to express any further interest.

=== PRR class S1 ===
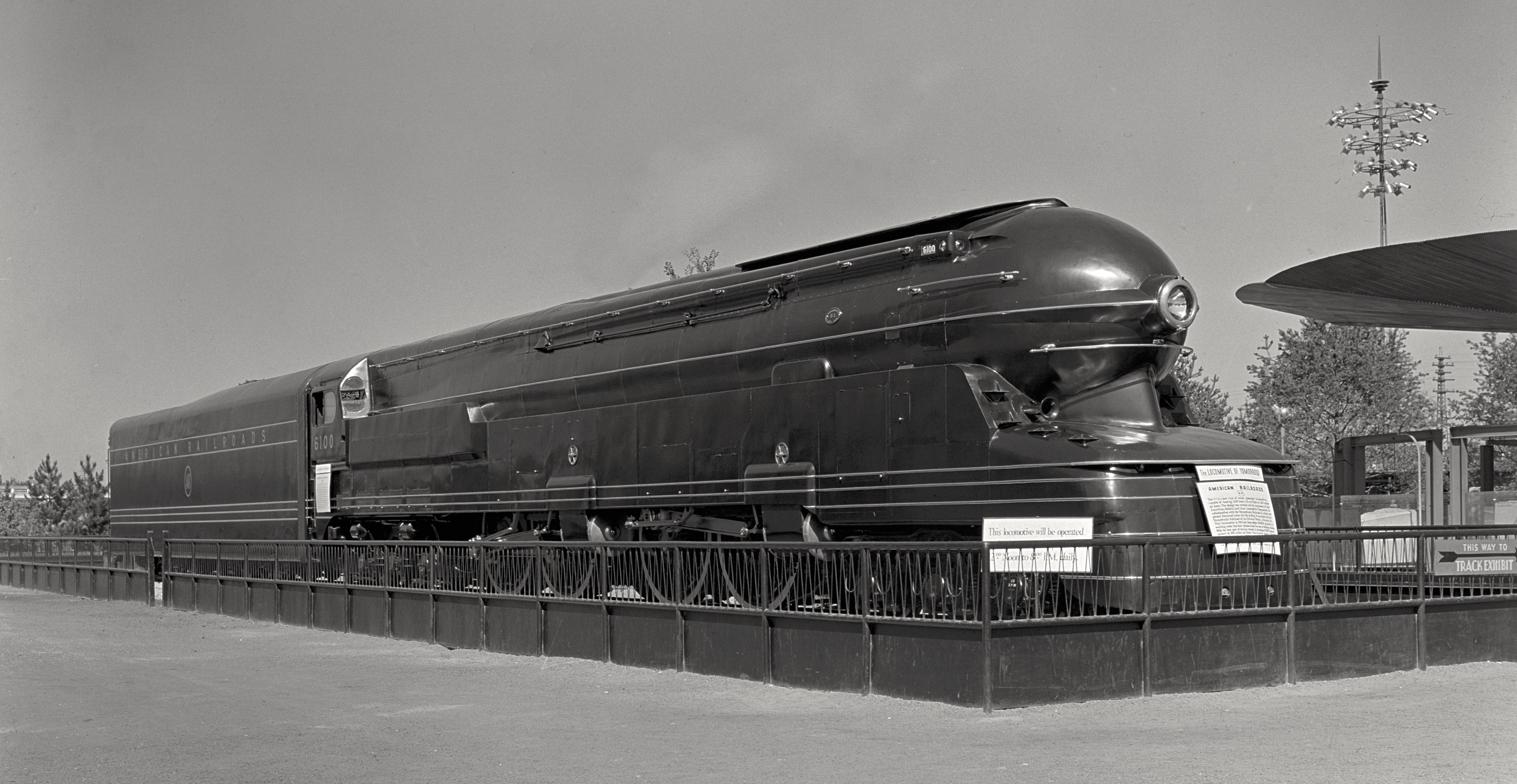
The S1 at the 1939 New York World's Fair.

The next usage of the duplex type was the Pennsylvania Railroad's single S1, designed to meet a requirement to operate a 1,200 short tons (1,070 long tons; 1,090 t) train at 100 mph (160 km/h) on level track and able to accelerate to that speed easily. In excess of 4,000 hp (3.0 MW) was necessary for that requirement, and to meet it Baldwin and the PRR created possibly the largest passenger steam locomotive ever built: a 6-4-4-6 locomotive 140 feet 2 1/2 inches (42.74 m) long and weighing 1,060,000 lb (480,000 kg) with tender. It was, in fact, too large to work over the majority of the PRR's system and was placed into service only between Chicago, Illinois and Crestline, Ohio (283 miles [455 km]). In service after December 1940, it proved powerful and capable but prone to wheelslip and surging, presaging the problems with later duplex designs. By and large, its flaws were written-off as simply the teething troubles of an early, first-cut prototype. It was taken out of service in 1946. This locomotive got the nickname "The Big Engine"

=== PRR class T1 ===
T1 prototype PRR 6110 at the Baldwin Locomotive Works in 1942.

The S1 did not represent Baldwin's true desires for the type, but in the design of the T1, of which two prototypes were ordered in July 1940, Baldwin was given much more freedom. The PRR's requirements were the use of the Belpaire firebox and the Franklin oscillating-cam poppet valve gear. The two, #6110 and #6111, were delivered in April and May 1942. Testing again proved them to be powerful and capable, but not sure-footed.

As soon as wartime restrictions on producing passenger locomotives were eased in February, 1945, the PRR placed an order for 50 production examples. This was a fateful step, since the problems encountered with the prototypes had not been ironed-out nor had they been tested with the intensity required to be sure of production reliability. The production locomotives differed in detail in their streamlined casings and in the suspension, in an attempt to increase adhesion.

Problems became apparent very soon. The locomotives were incredibly susceptible to violent wheelslip, not just at starting but also at speed. Dividing the drive into two groups meant that each group was much more likely to slip. A theory has been advanced that the more rapid, "sharper" opening of the valves with the poppet valve gear exacerbated the problem. Worse, such violent high-speed slipping could damage the valve gear components. This was a major problem on a locomotive with the poppet valve gear because, unlike the familiar piston valves and outside Walschaerts valve gear of other locomotives, many of the components were nearly inaccessible within the frame. Their complexity meant that availability and reliability proved poor, and, while a very capable locomotive engineer (driver) could extract great performance from a T1, they proved rather unsuccessful in service.

Whether the problems were soluble has been contentious ever since. However, the much easier solution of the diesel locomotive was taken within months of the production locomotives being delivered, and within 2 years all principal passenger trains were diesel-hauled. The T1s spent a few more years in lesser service before being withdrawn in 1952.

A nonprofit group known as the T1 Trust is in the process of constructing a new duplex locomotive, a T1-class engine known as Pennsylvania Railroad 5550, intending to utilize design improvements from the postwar steam era not used or seldom tested on pre-existing T1s in the hope of creating better performance characteristics. The estimated year of completion for the project is 2030.

=== PRR Q1 ===
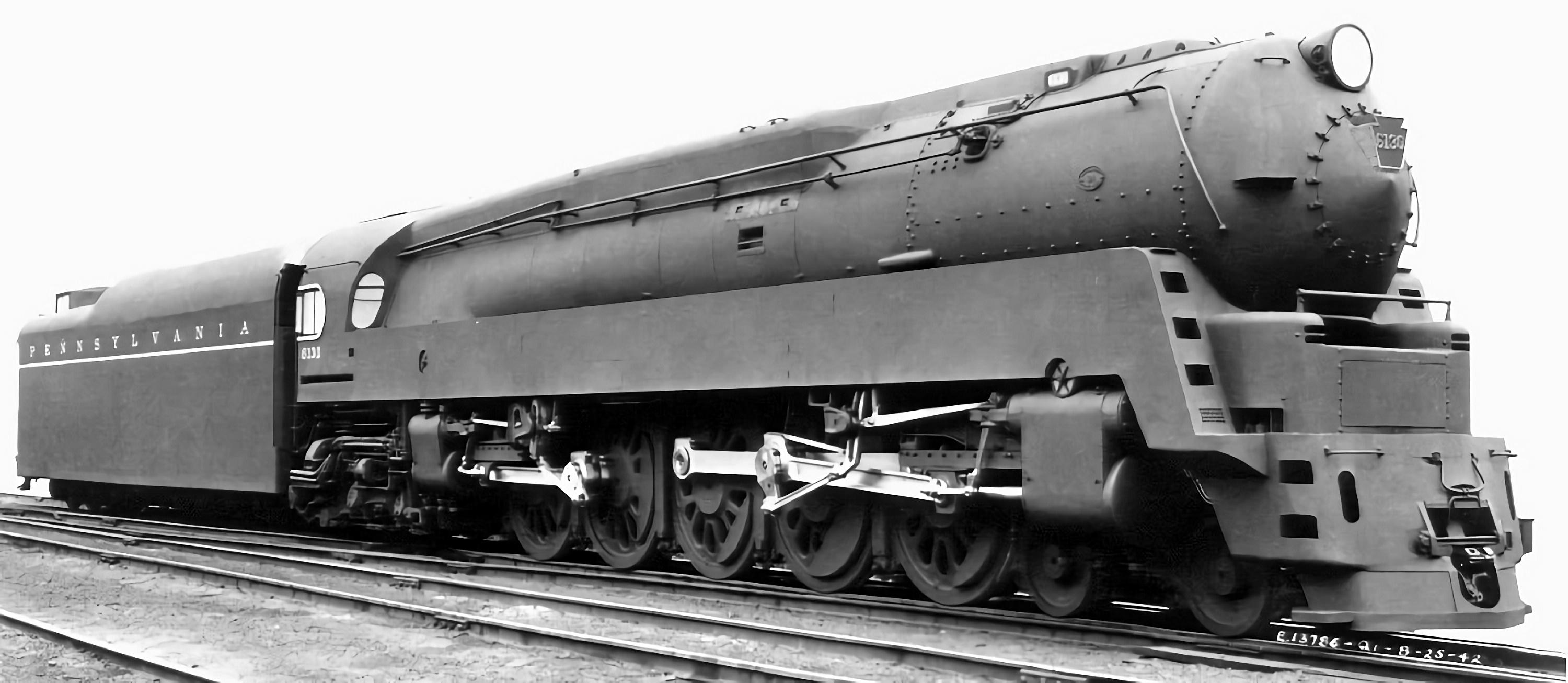
The unusual PRR Q1 with its opposite facing cylinders and iconic streamlining.

The PRR also desired to apply the duplex principle to freight haulage, and the Q1 was the first experiment in that direction. It was a 4-6-4-4 fast freight locomotive, delivered in May 1942. Like the B&O's George H. Emerson it had the second pair of cylinders facing backwards, and all were fitted with standard Walschaerts valve gear. The wheels were of 77 inches (1.956 m) diameter (ill-suited for freight hauling) and the engine was streamlined more like a passenger engine. The streamlining was later removed, as it restricted maintenance work. The rear-facing cylinders were also problematic, partially due to the inconvenient placement of being directly below the engine's firebox. Furthermore, the large drivers and smaller than adequate firebox grate area may have contributed to further problems as well. The limited firebox size was also a direct effect of the backward-facing cylinders. The lone Q1, PRR 6130, was constructed at the PRR's Altoona Works in 1942 and withdrawn from service in 1946.

=== PRR Q2 ===
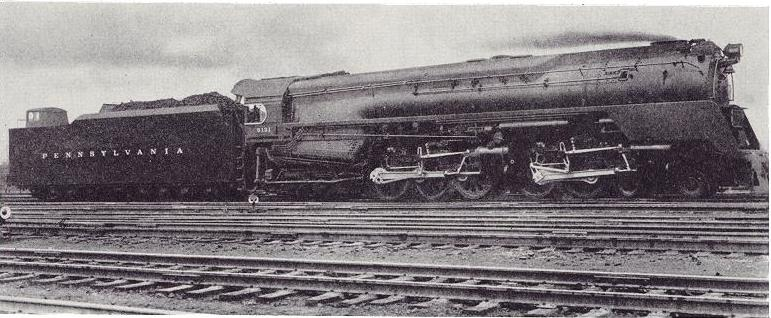
The Q2 4-4-6-4 was the most successful example of the duplex locomotive constructed by the PRR.

Production locomotives followed from the end of 1944, but these were rather different, the lesson that backward-facing cylinders next to the firebox were a poor design choice made clear. The production Q2 locomotives were of 4-4-6-4 arrangement; they were the largest non-articulated locomotives ever built and the most powerful locomotives ever static-tested, producing 7,987 hp (5,956 kW) on the PRR's static-test plant. The Q2 locomotives were also the most powerful steam locomotive ever constructed with ten driving wheels.

In operation, the Q2 could outperform pre-existing freight engines hauling double the tonnage of their predecessors. Furthermore, the Q2 had no problems building up steam power and was known to be a very smooth-riding engine. 26 were built at PRR's Altoona Works, and they were by far the most successful duplex type. The duplex propensity to slip was combated by an automatic slip control mechanism that reduced power to the slipping unit. The slip control mechanism was not always responsive, and its complexity often lead to maintenance crews not maintaining it during overhauls.

Despite overall success, the Q2s were all out of service by 1951. With dieselization, they were the obvious first targets to be withdrawn since they were only a little more capable than the conventional J1 class 2-10-4s, but with far higher running costs and maintenance loads.

=== PLM 151 A ===
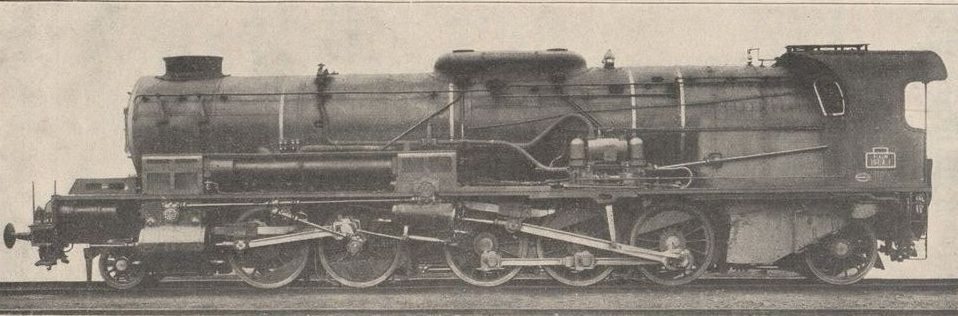
The quite successful 151 A of the PLM

In France, the duplex type was made famous by the ten 2-4-6-2 compound locomotives built in 1932 for the Chemins de fer de Paris à Lyon et à la Méditerranée (PLM) to haul heavy freight trains on the 0.8% grade of the Paris–Marseille railway between Les Laumes and Dijon. The performance was so good that the company wanted to order more engines, but the nationalization of the railways in 1938 stopped all projects. These duplex engines were fitted with Lenz-Dabeg rotary cam valve gear and soon thereafter with double exhaust. The low-pressure cylinders drove the first two coupled axle, and the high pressure cylinders the second set of drive wheels consisting of three axles. Both groups of drivers where linked with inside connecting rods through inside cranks on the second and third drivers, making this locomotive a true 2-10-2. The driving wheels had a diameter of 1.50 m (4 ft 11 in). The highest permissible speed was 53 mph (85 km/h).

In a test on December 19, 1933, the engine developed slightly more than 3,000 hp (2,200 kW) at the drawbar over a distance of 37 miles (60 km) and a speed of at least 46 mph (74 km/h), without being overworked. In ordinary service these engines could haul 1,375 short tons (1,228 long tons; 1,247 t), sustaining 31 mph (50 km/h) at the summit of the 0.8% Blaisy grade. After electrification of the line, the 151A's were sent for service in northeastern France. They were withdrawn from service in 1956 and scrapped.

== Sources ==
- Cravero, Carlo (2011). "Le locomotive a vapore americane tipo Duplex=American steam locomotives: the Duplex". Ingegneria ferroviaria (in Italian and English). 66 (5): 413–447.
- Reed, Brian (June 1972). Loco Profile 24: Pennsylvania Duplexii. Profile Publications.
- Staufer, Alvin (1962). Pennsy Power. Staufer. LOC 62-20872.
- Vilain, L.M. (1971). L'évolution du matériel moteur et roulant de la Cie. PLM. Vincent, Fréal et Cie Paris.
