= Pennsylvania Railroad class M1 =

Class of 301 American 4-8-2 locomotives

Pennsylvania Railroad M1
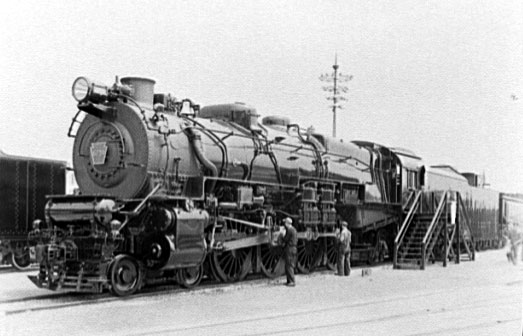
- PRR M1a on display at the 1939 World's Fair. Pipe on the smokebox and box behind stack are components of the feedwater heater.
Type and origin
- Power type: Steam
- Builder: PRR Altoona Works, Baldwin Locomotive Works, Lima Locomotive Works
- Serial number: Lima 7099–7123, 7443–7467
- Build date: 1923-1930
- Total produced: 301
Specifications
- Configuration
  - Whyte: 4-8-2
- Gauge: 4 ft 8 1/2 in (1,435 mm)
- Driver dia.: 72 in (1.829 m)
- Wheelbase
  - incl. tender: 79.32 ft (24.18 m)
- Length: Loco: 54 ft 11 in (16.74 m); Tender: 52 ft 11 in (16.13 m)
- Width: 10 ft 0 in (3.05 m)
- Height: 15 ft 6 in (4.72 m)
- Axle load: 67,750 lb (30,700 kg; 30.7 t)
- Adhesive weight: 271,000 lb (123,000 kg; 123 t)
- Loco weight: 390,000 lb (177,000 kg; 177 t)
- Tender weight: 378,360 lb (172,000 kg; 172 t)
- Total weight: 768,360 lb (349,000 kg; 349 t)
- Water cap.: 22,090 US gal (83,600 L; 18,390 imp gal)
- Tender cap.: 31.5 short tons (28.6 t; 28.1 long tons)
- Firebox
  - Grate area: 69.90 sq ft (6.494 m^{2})
- Boiler: 84 1/2 in (2,146 mm)
- Boiler pressure: M1a: 250 psi (1.72 MPa), M1b: 270 psi (1.86 MPa)
- Cylinders: Two
- Cylinder size: 27 in × 30 in (686 mm × 762 mm)
- Valve gear: Walschaerts
- Valve type: Piston
Performance figures
- Maximum speed: 70 mph (110 km/h)
- Power output: M1a: 4,034 hp (3,008 kW)
- Tractive effort: M1a: 64,550 lbf (287.1 kN), M1b: 69,700 lbf (310.0 kN)
- Factor of adh.: M1a: 4.20, M1b: 3.89
Career
- Operators: Pennsylvania Railroad
- Class: M1, M1a,
- Number in class: M1: 201, M1a: 100
- Numbers: M1: 6699, 6800–6999, M1a: 6700–6799
- Retired: 1957
- Preserved: 1
- Disposition: #6755 preserved, one tender preserved and set to be used on T1 new build, remainder scrapped

The M1 was a class of steam locomotive of the Pennsylvania Railroad (PRR). It was a class of heavy mixed-traffic locomotives of the 4-8-2 "Mountain" arrangement, which uses four pairs of driving wheels with a four-wheel guiding truck in front for stability at speed and a two-wheel trailing truck to support the large firebox needed for sustained power. Although built for both passenger and freight work, they spent most of their service lives hauling heavy high-speed freight trains.

== History ==
A single prototype, #4700 (later renumbered 6699), was built in 1923 at the railroad's Altoona Works. It spent three years in testing, including all kinds of main line service as well as a session on the railroad's static test plant. Having received favorable reports, a further 200 were ordered from commercial locomotive builders; 175 from the Baldwin Locomotive Works and 25 from Lima Locomotive Works. Breaking with the PRR tradition of random locomotive numbering, these were numbered in a solid block from #6800-#6999.

In 1930, 100 more were ordered; this class M1a had several improvements. Instead of separate cylinder block and smokebox saddle castings, the M1a had a one-piece casting (first seen on the K5 Pacific) with inside steam delivery pipes, instead of the outside, visible pipes of the M1. A Worthington feedwater heater was installed, with a boxlike mixing chamber behind the stack. Twin cross-compound air compressors were hung next to each other on the left side, instead of the single compressor of the M1. The M1a locomotives had larger tenders than the previous locomotives.

The M1a locomotives were intended for passenger as well as freight service, and some bore decorative gold-leaf lining on tender and cab sides, but they proved better suited to freight work, and extensive electrification saw a surplus of K4s locomotives available for passenger trains. While they were mostly used on freight, their dual service purpose entitled them to have smokebox mounted keystone shaped numberplates. Freight engines on the Pennsy had circular numberplates.

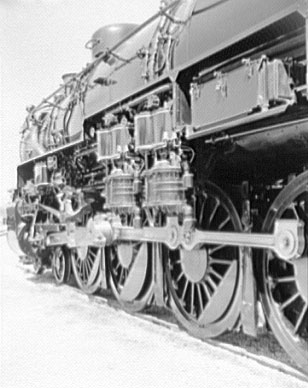
The twin cross-compound air compressors on the side of the M1a.

Like most PRR steam locomotives, the M1 and M1a featured the square-shouldered Belpaire firebox. The square-topped section continued ahead of the firebox proper, revealing the presence of a combustion chamber - an extended firebox, giving more room for complete combustion of burning gases. The standard M1/M1a boiler used a working pressure of 250 pounds per square inch (1.72 MPa). 40 locomotives were later converted into class M1b; the differences were all in the boiler, those being the addition of firebox circulators—large tubes carrying water passing through the firebox space, increasing water circulation and heating area, and thus steam generation—and an increase in boiler pressure to 270 psi (1.86 MPa). The only externally visible difference was extra cleaning plugs in the firebox sides, for washing out the circulators. The M1b had greater tractive effort, thanks to the greater pressure, and more power at speed.

All were fitted with 72-inch (1.829 m) driving wheels, two 27 in × 30 in (686 mm × 762 mm) cylinders, and cast-steel KW pattern trailing trucks, similar to those fitted to K4s Pacifics. M1 and M1a tractive effort was 64,550 pounds-force (287.1 kN) while that of the M1b was 69,700 pounds-force (310.0 kN). Weight was 385,000 pounds (174.6 t). PRR standard small steel cabs were used. A spotting feature was a large cross-mounted air tank at the front of the locomotive above the pilot. There was a family resemblance with other PRR locomotives. After World War II, the M1 locomotives underwent similar front-end changes to those made to the K4s, including sheet steel drop-coupler pilots, the moving of the headlight to the smokebox top in front of the stack, the moving of the steam-driven generator to the smokebox front for easier maintenance, and the addition of a wide step above the air tank to service the air compressor.

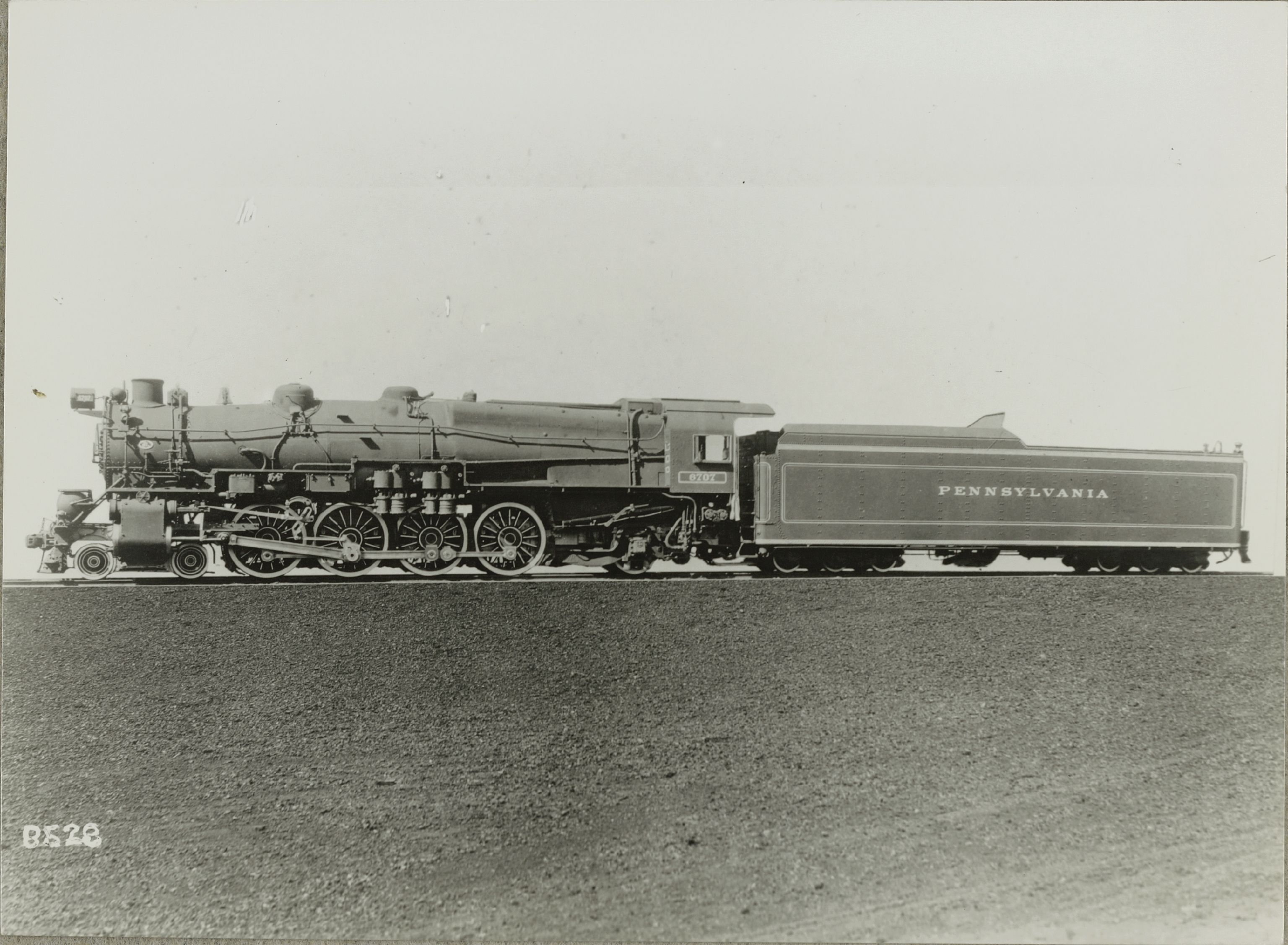
Pennsylvania Railroad M1 6707 builder's photo

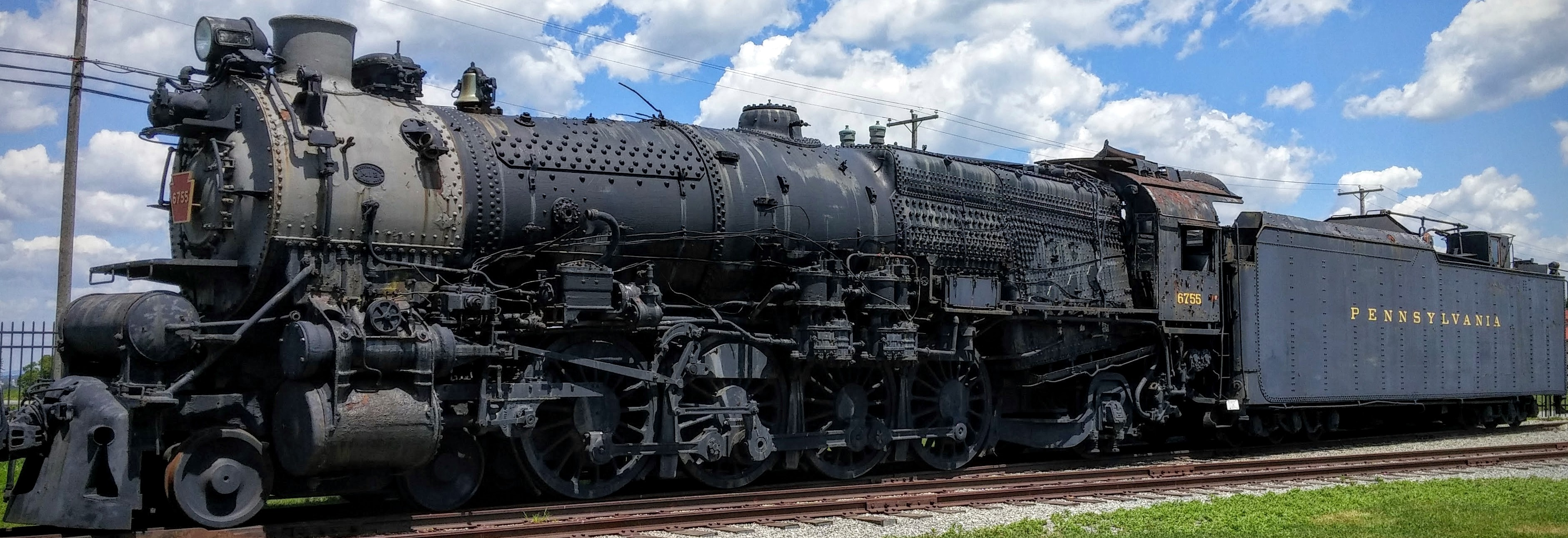
Pennsylvania Railroad M1b #6755 at the Railroad Museum of Pennsylvania on July 31, 2015.

A variety of tenders were fitted to M1 locomotives, of steadily-increasing size. During later years some hauled sixteen-wheel 210-F-75B tenders almost as long as the locomotives themselves. All were fitted with scoops to pick up water from track pans. On the rear tender decks, all were later fitted with "doghouses" for the head-end brakeman on freight trains, giving him a view backward over the train and placing him out of the way of the engineer and fireman. Many had railing-like trainphone antennas added during the 1940s.

As dieselization progressed, the M1 locomotives were assigned to heavier trains, while the diesels were assigned the high-speed freight trains that were previously the M1s' preserve. Their final years of service saw them hauling heavier trains than ever. Many remained in service until the withdrawal of steam from the PRR in mid-1957.

== Preservation ==
One locomotive, M1b #6755, was saved from the scrapper's torch for the PRR's historical collection housed at Northumberland, Pennsylvania. It is now in the possession of the Railroad Museum of Pennsylvania, in Strasburg, PA. It was added to the National Register of Historic Places in 1979 as Locomotive No. 6755.

The tender of M1 #6659, minus the engine, has also been preserved and was purchased by the Pennsylvania Railroad T1 Steam Locomotive Trust in August, 2017. The tender will be restored for eventual use behind the new-build T1 class locomotive #5550.

== See also ==
- NYC Mohawk: The New York Central Railroad's equivalent of the M1, a dual mode 4-8-2 "Mountain" type steam locomotive.
