= Pennsylvania Railroad 6755 =

Preserved PRR M1s class 4-8-2 locomotive

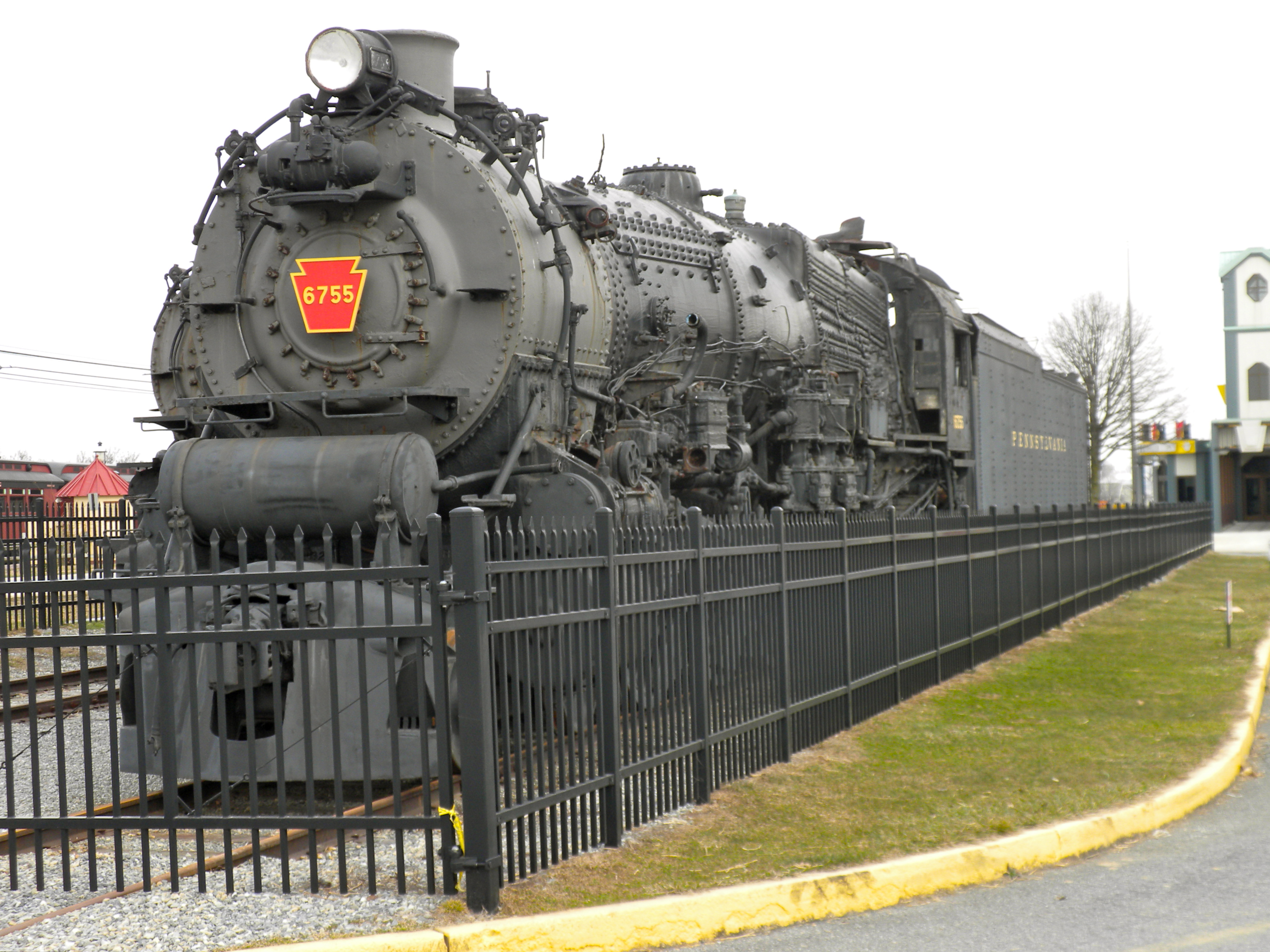
- No. 6755 on display at the Railroad Museum of Pennsylvania in 2010
Type and origin
- Power type: Steam
- Builder: Altoona Works
- Serial number: 4225
- Build date: June 1930
Specifications
- Configuration
  - Whyte: 4-8-2
- Gauge: 4 ft 8 1/2 in (1,435 mm)
- Driver dia.: 72 in (1.829 m)
- Axle load: 67,750 lb (30,700 kg; 30.7 t)
- Adhesive weight: 271,000 lb (122.9 t)
- Loco weight: 385,000 lb (174.6 t)
- Tender weight: 378,360 lb (172,000 kg; 172 t)
- Total weight: 768,360 lb (349,000 kg; 349 t)
- Tender type: 210F75A "Long-haul"
- Fuel type: Coal
- Fuel capacity: 31 t (30.5 long tons; 34.2 short tons)
- Water cap.: 22,020 Gallons
- Firebox
  - Grate area: 69.90 sq ft (6.494 m^{2})
- Boiler pressure: 270 psi (1.86 MPa)
- Feedwater heater: Worthington
- Heating surface
  - Firebox: 397 sq. ft
- Cylinders: Two, outside
- Cylinder size: 27 in × 30 in (686 mm × 762 mm)
- Valve gear: Walschearts
- Valve type: Piston
Performance figures
- Maximum speed: 70 mph (110 km/h)
- Tractive effort: 69,711 lbf (310.1 kN)
- Factor of adh.: 3.89
Career
- Operators: Pennsylvania Railroad
- Class: M1b
- Numbers: PRR 6755
- Retired: 1957
- Current owner: Pennsylvania Historical and Museum Commission
- Disposition: On static display

- Locomotive No. 6755
- U.S. National Register of Historic Places
- Location within Pennsylvania Location within the United States
- Nearest city: Strasburg, Pennsylvania
- Coordinates: 39°58′56″N 76°9′40″W
- Area: less than one acre
- Built: 1930
- Architect: Pennsylvania Railroad
- Architectural style: dual service
- MPS: Pennsylvania Railroad Rolling Stock TR
- NRHP reference No.: 01000519
- Added to NRHP: December 17, 1979

Pennsylvania Railroad 6755 is a preserved M1b class 4-8-2 "Mountain" type steam locomotive built in June 1930 for the Pennsylvania Railroad by the railroad's own Altoona Works as a member of the M1b locomotive class for mainline freight service. Retired from commercial service in 1957, the locomotive was preserved by the Pennsylvania Railroad and was placed on display at the Railroad Museum of Pennsylvania in Strasburg, Pennsylvania. The No. 6755 is the only M1 class locomotive to have survived into preservation.

== History ==
The No. 6755 was built by the Altoona Works in June 1930. The 6755 was a class M1a and was used predominantly in freight service, though it would occasionally be used for passenger trains. In 1953, the locomotive went back to the Altoona Works and was rebuilt into a class M1b. The locomotive continued to be used for freight service until 1957, when it was retired from the roster.

== Present status ==
The No. 6755 is on static display at the Railroad Museum of Pennsylvania in Strasburg, Pennsylvania. The No. 6755 has since been deteriorating at a rapid pace, with its boiler jackets removed in the early 2000s. Prolonged exposure to the elements has wreaked havoc on major parts of the locomotive, causing structural rust. The No. 6755 is one of the locomotives the museum plans to place inside the roundhouse currently under construction as of July 2025.

== Gallery ==
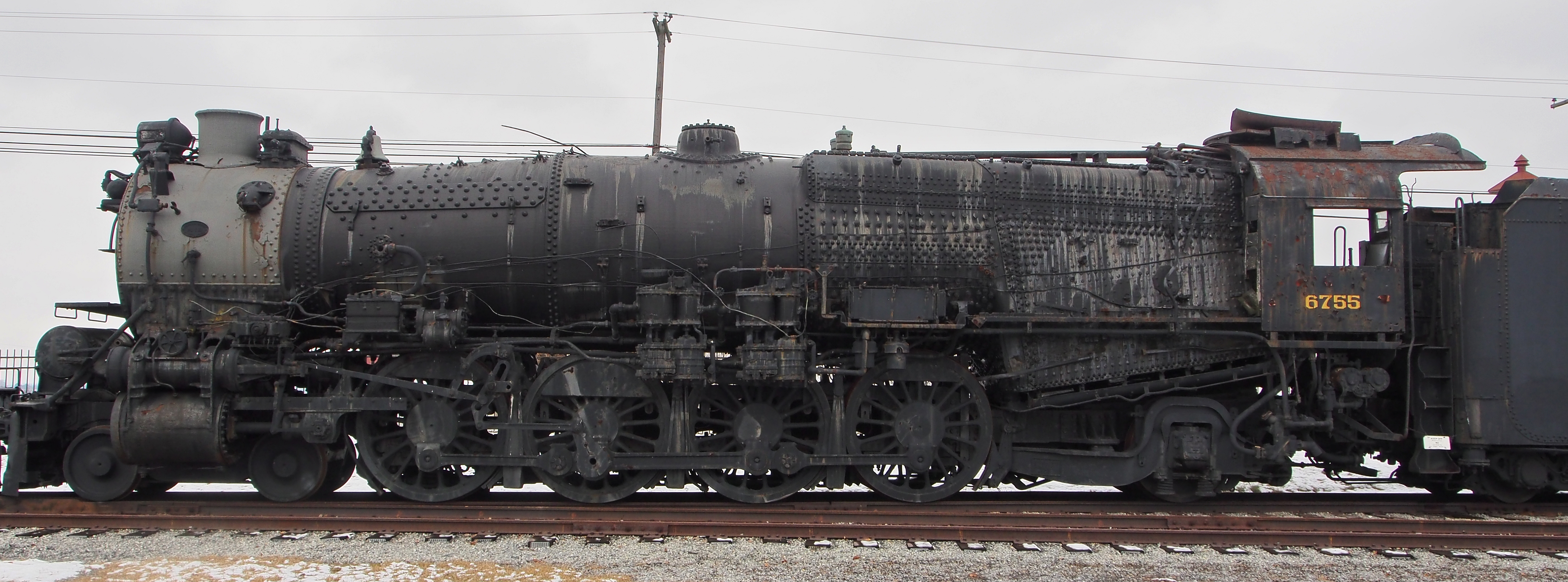
On display at the Railroad Museum of Pennsylvania

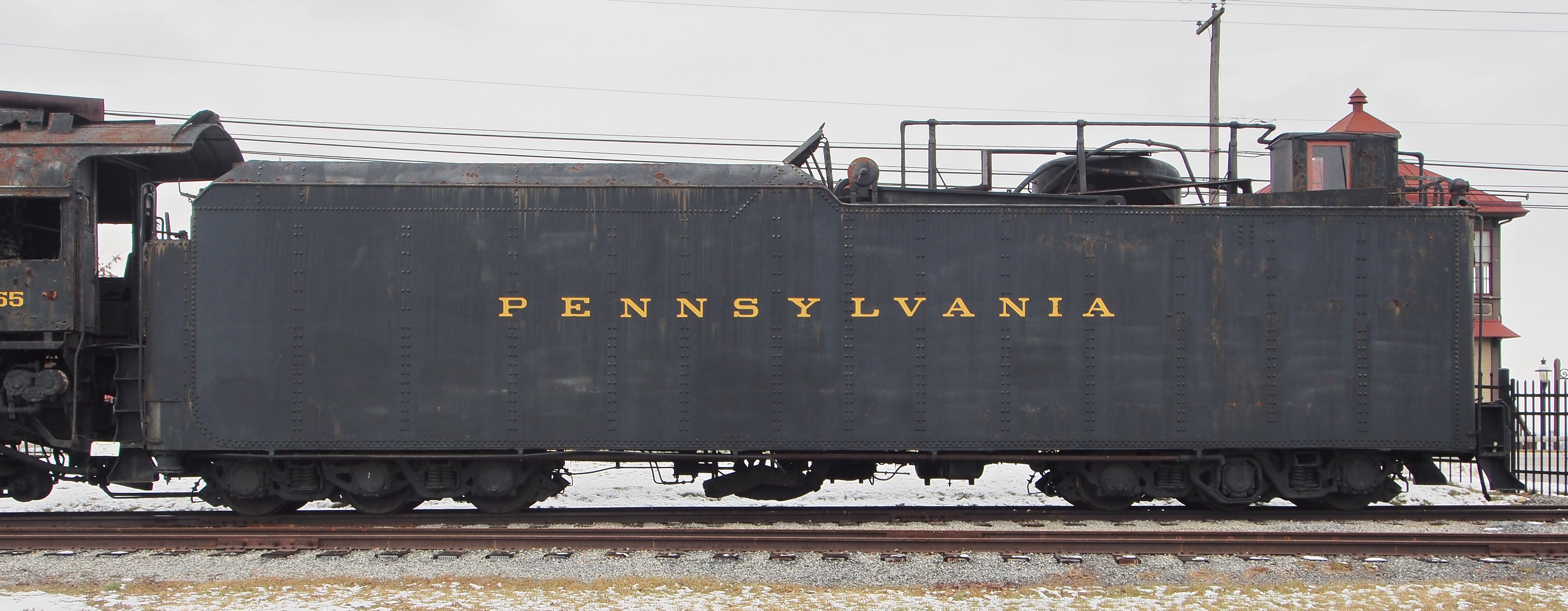
The attached coal tender.

== See also ==
NYC 3001- This is the New York Central Railroad's version of the M1 that survives. Just like the 6755, the 3001 was a dual-service locomotive.
