= South Australian Railways 520 class =

Class of Australian 4-8-4 locomotives

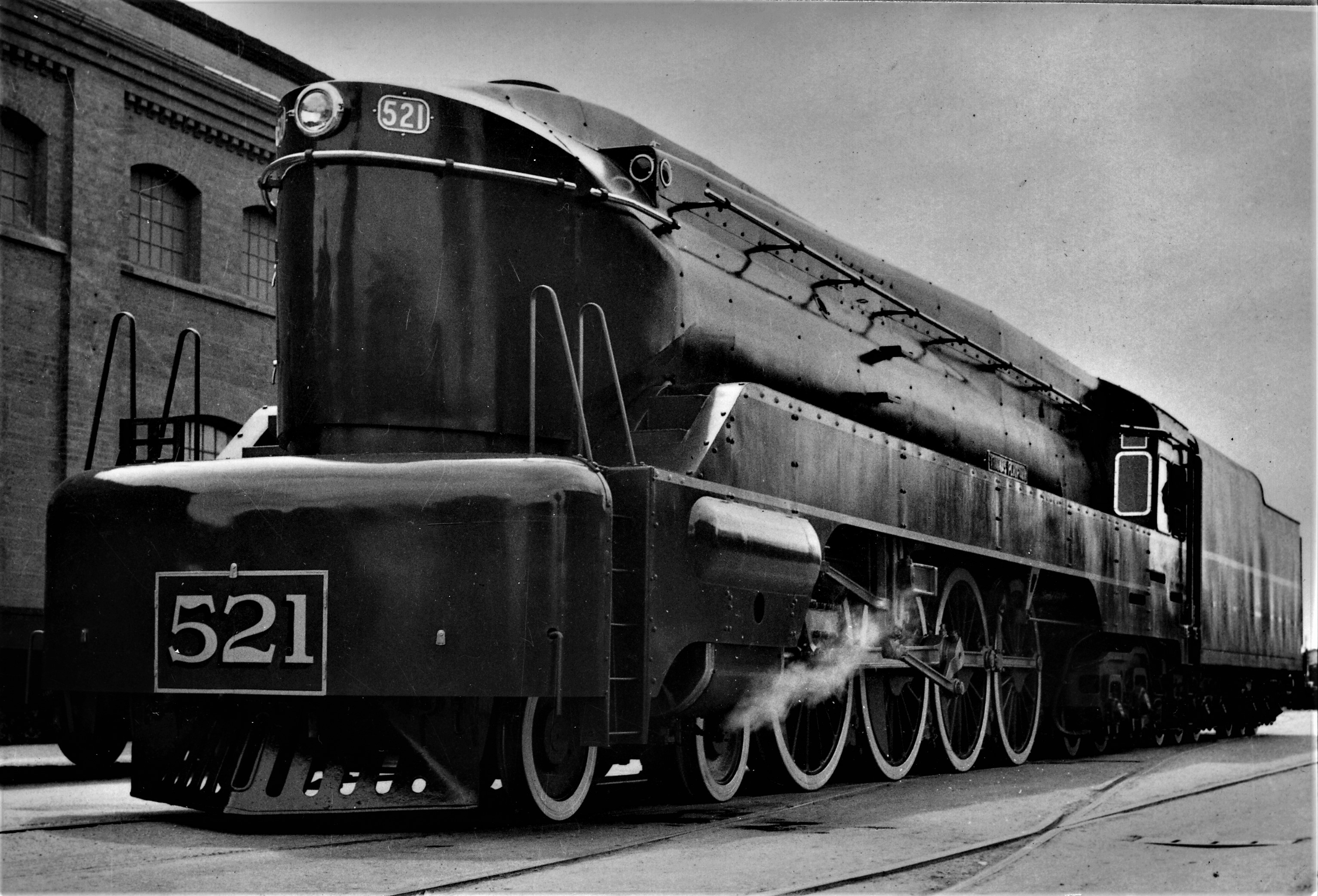
- 521 Thomas Playford when new in February 1944
Type and origin
- Power type: Steam
- Designer: Frank Hugh Harrison
- Builder: Islington Railway Workshops
- Serial number: 81-92
- Build date: 1943–1947
- Total produced: 12
Specifications
- Configuration
  - Whyte: 4-8-4
  - UIC: 2′D2′h2
- Gauge: 1,600 mm (5 ft 3 in)
- Leading dia.: 2 ft 9 in (0.838 m)
- Driver dia.: 5 ft 6 in (1.676 m)
- Trailing dia.: 3 ft 0 in (0.914 m) 3 ft 6 in (1.067 m)
- Length: 87 ft 4.5 in (26.63 m)
- Height: 13 ft 8 5/8 in (4,183.0 mm)
- Axle load: 15 long tons 16 cwt or 35,400 lb or 17.7 short tons or 16.1 t
- Adhesive weight: 62 long tons 10 cwt or 140,000 lb or 70.0 short tons or 63.5 t
- Loco weight: 111 long tons 8 cwt or 249,500 lb or 124.8 short tons or 113.2 t
- Total weight: 200 long tons 13 cwt or 449,500 lb or 224.7 short tons or 203.9 t
- Fuel type: Coal
- Fuel capacity: 9 long tons 15 cwt or 21,800 lb or 10.9 short tons or 9.9 t
- Water cap.: 9,100 imp gal (10,900 US gal; 41,000 L)
- Firebox
  - Grate area: 45 sq ft (4.2 m^{2})
- Boiler pressure: 215 psi (1,482 kPa)
- Heating surface
  - Firebox: 291 sq ft (27.0 m^{2})
  - Tubes: 2,163 sq ft (200.9 m^{2})
- Superheater
  - Heating area: 651 sq ft (60.5 m^{2})
- Cylinders: 2
- Cylinder size: 20.5 in × 28 in (521 mm × 711 mm)
- Valve gear: Walschaerts
- Valve type: Piston
Performance figures
- Maximum speed: 112 km/h (70 mph)
- Power output: 2,600 hp (1,900 kW) at 70 mph (110 km/h)
- Tractive effort: as previously built 32,600 lbf (145 kN)
- Factor of adh.: 4.3
Career
- Operators: South Australian Railways
- Class: 520
- Number in class: 12
- Numbers: 520-531
- Nicknames: Whispering Giants
- First run: 10 November 1943
- Withdrawn: 1961–1971
- Preserved: 520 and 523
- Scrapped: 1961–1971
- Disposition: 2 preserved, 10 scrapped

The South Australian Railways 520 class, also known as "The Whispering Giants", is a class of streamliner 4-8-4 'Northern' type steam locomotive operated by the former South Australian Railways. The 520 class is one of the fastest Australian-built steam locomotives, with locomotive No. 520 holding a verified speed record of over 78 mph on the Port Pirie line on 10 November 1943.

== History ==
During Second World War, the South Australian Railways (SAR) badly needed additional tractive power on growing troop and supply trains. With the combined need for quick acceleration and high speed over the flat and generally straight mainlines north of Adelaide to Port Pirie, as well as sustained power for the 19-mile (31 km) long, 1-in-45 (2.2%) climb up the Adelaide Hills to Melbourne, a new locomotive was required by the SAR. The 520 class was commissioned, combining the better features of the earlier 500 and 620 class locomotives.

== Design ==
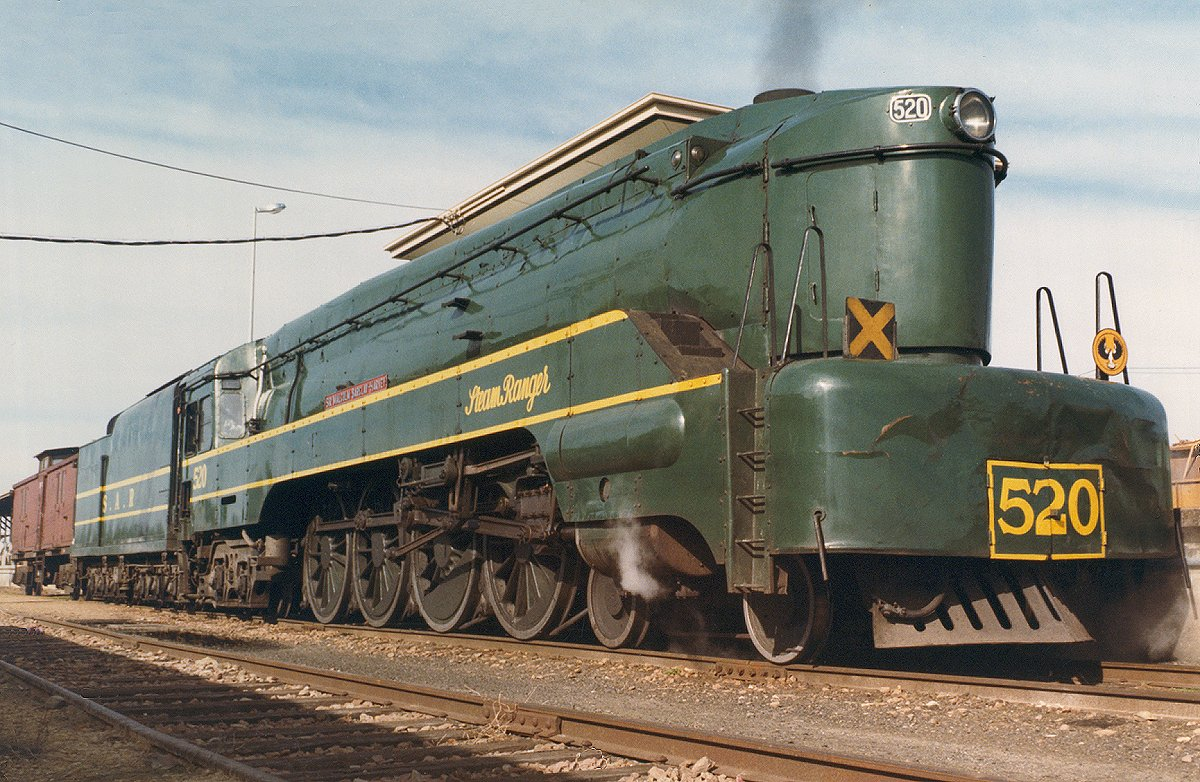
Locomotive No. 520 of the SAR '520' class, 1984.

The class used the 4-8-4 configuration of the modified 500B class, but was also designed for work on branch lines with light 60 lb/yd (29.8 kg/m) rail with a reduced tender load. The considerable weight of the locomotive was spread over eight axles, four driving and four in the leading and trailing trucks, yielding the necessary light axle loading for operation over the aforementioned territory. The 520s used this to the fullest, their normal mainline stamping grounds being on fast track express services on the Pirie line, namely the East-West Express, but also serving upon many of the Tailem Bend mixed and radiating branchline trains. The only lines that they were restricted from running on were those laid with very light 40 or 50 lb/yd (19.8 or 24.8 kg/m) rail.

The 520 class is arguably the most striking and unique out of all Australian steam locomotives. The class features extravagant streamlining, in the style of the Pennsylvania Railroad's T1 in the United States. The original streamlining was more closely based on the T1, and class members 520-522 were fitted with such. Members 523-531 were built with a narrower front profile, attributed to by the "crown" of grill around the chimney front. The earlier streamlined model had a lower front, resulting in a squat chimney profile extended from an otherwise graceful streamlined casing. During their service life, some of the class lost the cowling around their front buffer beam, a move which simplified maintenance.

The 520 class locomotives were noted for their impressive displays of power and speed. They featured specially balanced driving wheels that while only 66 inches (1,676 mm) in diameter, were designed for 70-mile-per-hour (113 km/h) operation, and were also the first locomotives in Australia to feature Timken roller bearings on all axles. Classleader 520 attained a speed of 78 miles per hour (126 km/h) between Red Hill and Port Pirie when it entered service on 10 November 1943. Surviving test records show the locomotive was capable of developing an indicated horsepower output of 2,600 horsepower (1,940 kW) at 70 mph while hauling a 510-tonne (500-long-ton) load.

A total of 12 locomotives were built at Islington Railway Workshops between 1943 and 1947. They were progressively replaced in service from the early 1960s by diesel locomotives, and in particular the 830 class, as repairs, namely to boilers, were required. The 520s were the first class in South Australia, and possibly Australia, to facilitate the use of completely welded boiler assemblies, an idea adopted by their designer Frank Hugh Harrison after a trip to the United States of America.

The long boiler tubes of the 520 class required the blower to be on while in yards, sidings and stations, and while drifting, to prevent blowback or entry of smoke into the almost entirely closed cab. On these occasions, the locomotives emitted a quiet "whispering" sound.

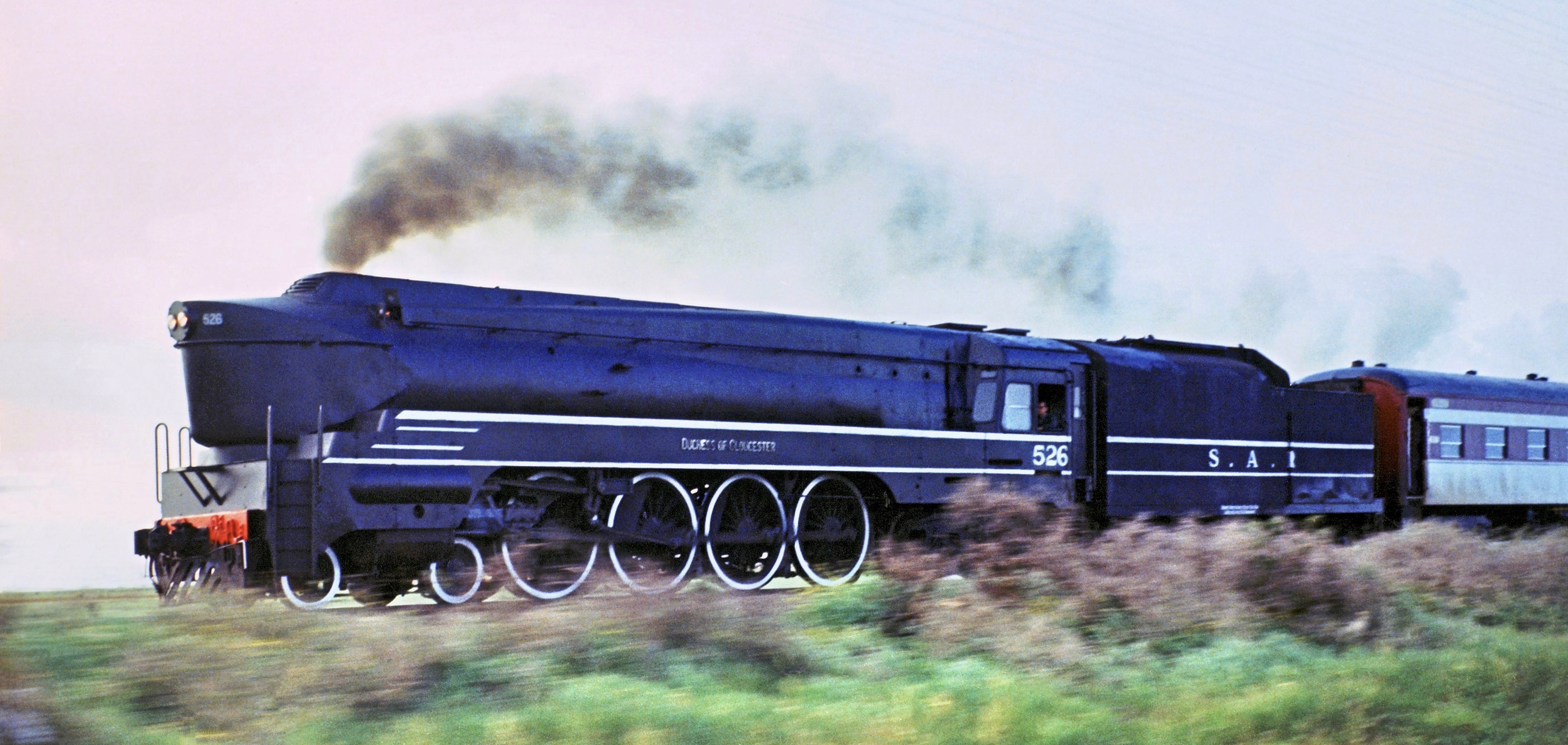
Although its under-16-ton axle load allowed the 520 class to work on all but the lightest broad-gauge lines of the SAR, its premier duty was high-speed haulage of passenger trains on the generally flat route between Adelaide and Port Pirie.

== Preservation ==
Two have been preserved:

- 520 at SteamRanger, was operational until 1998, when necessary repairs to the boiler, namely the removal of oil burning equipment, and a rusted tender frame, sidelined the engine. As of 2026 it is being restored to operational condition.
- 523 at the National Railway Museum in Port Adelaide, had been used extensively as a tour engine, failing on its final farewell Australian Railway Historical Society trip at Balhannah in the late 1960s.

== In popular culture ==
The SAR 520 class was notably featured in the 2016 film Thomas & Friends: The Great Race, as an engine named Shane. Shane returned in the twenty-second series of Thomas & Friends, voiced by Australian media personality, Shane Jacobson.

== Class list ==
| No. | Name | Entered service | Revenue mileage | Status as of 2021 |
|---|---|---|---|---|
| 520 | Sir Malcolm; Barclay‑Harvey | 10 November 1943 | Not available | (Condemned Aug 1969, reinstated May 1970. Acquired by SteamRanger 1988.) Under restoration to operational condition. |
| 521 | Thomas Playford | 17 February 1944 | 611,913 mi (984,779 km) | Scrapped March 1970 |
| 522 | Malcolm McIntosh | 19 April 1944 | 595,538 mi (958,426 km) | Scrapped September 1970 |
| 523 | Essington Lewis | 1 August 1944 | 511,955 mi (823,912 km) | Static display at National Railway Museum, Port Adelaide |
| 524 | Sir Mellis Napier | 24 November 1944 | 554,566 mi (892,487 km) | Scrapped August 1969 |
| 525 | Sir Willoughby Norrie | 22 February 1945 | 463,335 mi (745,665 km) | Scrapped August 1961 |
| 526 | Duchess of Gloucester | 28 June 1945 | 508,170 mi (817,820 km) | Hauled many excursion trains before being scrapped about 1971 |
| 527 | C. B. Anderson | 20 December 1946 | 411,516 mi (662,271 km) | Scrapped April 1963 |
| 528 | — | 9 June 1947 | 404,114 mi (650,358 km) | Scrapped June 1963 |
| 529 | — | 22 August 1947 | 412,605 mi (664,023 km) | Scrapped January 1964 |
| 530 | — | 1 November 1947 | 386,323 mi (621,727 km) | Scrapped September 1963 |
| 531 | — | 19 December 1947 | 380,145 mi (611,784 km) | Scrapped August 1963 |
