= Pennsylvania Railroad class T1 =

Class of 52 4-4-4-4 duplex locomotives

Pennsylvania Railroad T1
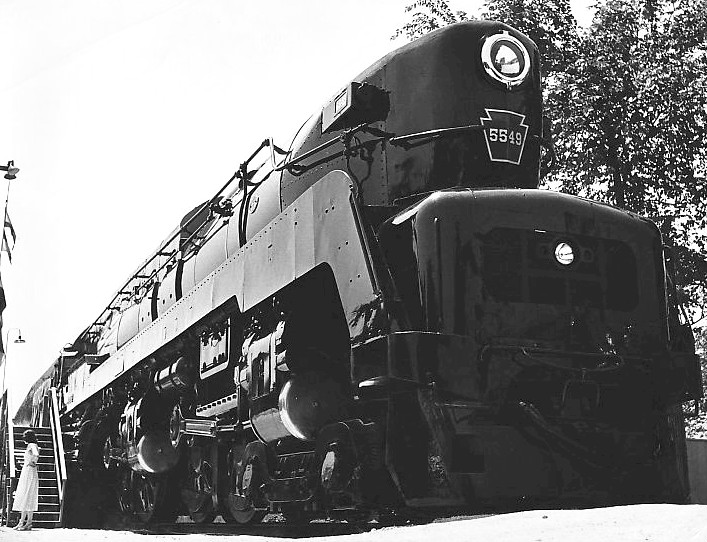
- T1 5549 on display.
Type and origin
- Power type: Steam
- Designer: Ralph P. Johnson; Raymond Loewy
- Builder: Altoona Works (5500–5524); Baldwin Locomotive Works (5525–5549, 6110–6111); Pennsylvania Railroad T1 Steam Locomotive Trust (5550)
- Serial number: Altoona 4560–4584; BLW 72764–72788 (5525–5519)
- Build date: 1942 (6110–6111); 1945–46 (5500–5549); 2014–present (5550)
- Total produced: 52
Specifications
- Configuration
  - Whyte: 4-4-4-4
  - UIC: 2′BB2′h4S
- Gauge: 4 ft 8 1/2 in (1,435 mm)
- Leading dia.: 36 in (914 mm)
- Driver dia.: 80 in (2,032 mm)
- Trailing dia.: 42 in (1,067 mm)
- Wheelbase: 107 ft 0 in (32.61 m)
- Length: 122 ft 9 3/4 in (37.43 m)
- Width: 11 ft 1 in (3.38 m)
- Height: 6111: 15 ft 6 in (4.72 m)
- Axle load: 71,680 lb (32.51 t)
- Adhesive weight: 279,910 lb (127.0 t)
- Loco weight: 502,200 lb (227.8 t)
- Tender weight: Empty: 197,400 lb (89.54 t); Loaded: 442,500 lb (200.7 t)
- Total weight: 944,700 lb (428.5 t)
- Tender type: 180 P 76 †, 180 P 84 ‡
- Fuel type: Coal
- Fuel capacity: 82,000 lb (37.19 t) †, 85,200 lb (38.65 t) ‡
- Water cap.: 19,500 US gal (74,000 L; 16,200 imp gal) †, 19,200 US gal (73,000 L; 16,000 imp gal) ‡
- Firebox
  - Grate area: 92 sq ft (8.5 m^{2})
- Boiler: 100 in (2,540 mm)
- Boiler pressure: 300 lbf/in^{2} (2.07 MPa)
- Heating surface
  - Firebox: 490 sq ft (45.5 m^{2})
  - Tubes and flues: 4,209 sq ft (391.0 m^{2})
  - Total surface: 5,639 sq ft (523.9 m^{2})
- Superheater
  - Type: Type A
  - Heating area: 1,430 sq ft (132.9 m^{2})
- Cylinders: Four
- Cylinder size: 19.75 in × 26 in (502 mm × 660 mm), 18.75 in × 26 in (476 mm × 660 mm) (some)
- Valve gear: Franklin Type A (as built), Franklin Type B-2 (5500, 5550), Walschaerts (5547)
- Valve type: Poppet valves, Piston Valves (5547)
- Valve travel: 7.5 in (190.5 mm) (5547)
- Valve lap: 1.625 in (41.3 mm) (5547)
Performance figures
- Maximum speed: 120 mph (190 km/h)
- Indicated power: 6,500 hp (4,800 kW)
- Power output: 5,012 hp (3,737 kW) (Drawbar)
- Tractive effort: Most: 64,653 lbf (287.6 kN) (at 85% cut-off); Some: 58,271 lbf (259.2 kN) (at 85% cut-off)
- Factor of adh.: 4.33
Career
- Operators: Pennsylvania Railroad
- Class: T1
- Number in class: 52 original, plus 1 under construction
- Numbers: 6110, 6111, 5500-5549, 5550
- Locale: Western Pennsylvania, Ohio, Indiana, Illinois
- First run: 1942
- Retired: 1953
- Withdrawn: 1952–1953
- Scrapped: 1953–1956
- Disposition: All 52 original scrapped, 1 new build (PRR 5550) under construction
- Notes: † 6110, 6111; ‡ 5500 - 5549, 5500

The Pennsylvania Railroad (PRR) class T1 duplex-drive 4-4-4-4 steam locomotives, introduced in 1942 with two prototypes and later in 1945-1946 with 50 production examples, were the last steam locomotives built for the PRR and arguably its most controversial. They were ambitious, technologically sophisticated, powerful, fast and distinctively streamlined by Raymond Loewy. However, they were also prone to wheelslip both when starting and at speed, in addition to being complicated to maintain and expensive to run. The PRR decided in 1948 to place diesel locomotives on all express passenger trains, leaving unanswered questions as to whether the T1's flaws were solvable, especially taking into account that the two prototypes did not have the problems inherent to the production units.

An article appearing in a 2008 issue of the Pennsylvania Railroad Technical and Historical Society Magazine showed that inadequate training for engineers transitioning to the T1 may have led to excessive throttle applications, resulting in driver slippage. Another root cause of wheelslip was faulty "spring equalization": The stiffnesses of the springs supporting the locomotive over the axles were not adjusted to properly equalize the wheel-to-track forces. The drivers were equalized together but not equalized with the engine truck. In the production fleet the PRR equalized the engine truck with the front engine and the trailing truck with the rear engine, which helped to solve the wheelslip problem.

== Historical development ==
No. 6110, the "sister" prototype of class T1 prototype No. 6111. Its streamlined casing was designed by renowned industrial designer Raymond Loewy.

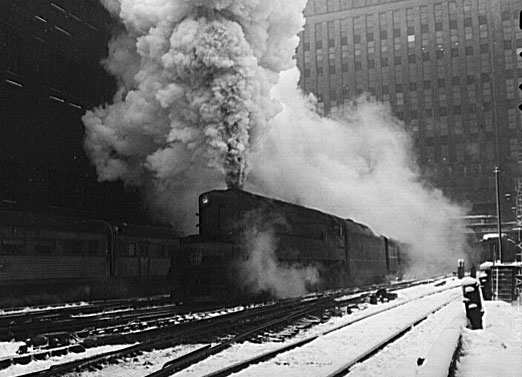
A T1 prototype leaving Chicago's Union Station in February 1943 with the Manhattan Limited to New York

Before the T1, the last production express passenger engine the PRR had produced was the K4s of 1914, produced until 1928. Two experimental enlarged K5 locomotives were produced in 1929, but they weren't considered enough of an improvement to be worthwhile. After that, the PRR's attention switched to electrification and the production of electric locomotives; apparently, the railroad decided that it did not need more steam locomotives.

However, the deficiencies of the K4s became more evident during the 1930s. The locomotives performed well, but as train lengths increased they proved to be underpowered; double-headed K4s locomotives became the norm on many trains. The railroad had many locomotives available, but paying two crews on two locomotives per train was expensive. Meanwhile, other railroads were leaping ahead, developing increasingly powerful passenger train locomotives. Rival New York Central built 4-6-4 Hudsons, while other roads developed passenger 4-8-2 "Mountain" type and then 4-8-4 "Northern" type designs. The PRR's steam power began to look outdated.

The PRR began to develop steam locomotives again in the mid-to-late 1930s, but with a difference. Where previous PRR locomotive policy had been conservative, new radical designs took hold. Designers from the Baldwin Locomotive Works, the PRR's longtime development partner, were eager to prove the viability of steam in the face of new competition from diesel-electric locomotives. They persuaded the railroad to adopt Baldwin's latest idea: the duplex locomotive. This split the locomotive's driving wheels into two sets, each with its own pair of cylinders and rods. Until then, the only locomotives with two sets of drivers were articulated locomotives, but the duplex used one rigid frame. In a duplex design cylinders could be smaller, and the weight of side and main rods could be drastically reduced. Given that the movement of the main rod could not be fully balanced, the duplex design would reduce the "hammer blow" on the track. The lower reciprocating mass meant that higher speeds could be achieved. Spreading the power across four smaller cylinders, rather than two large cylinders, could also yield greater sustained power at higher speeds. Use of poppet valves also gave longer duration for admission and exhaustion of steam compared with piston valves. The arrangement of the Franklin System of Steam Distribution also yielded finer cutoff control. One set of valves admits steam during a cylinder stroke, while a different set exhaust steam, the respective valves being shut during the other's part of the cycle. The system further accommodates the expansive properties of steam by having the exhaust ports and valves larger (6 in (150 mm)) than the intake ports (5 in (130 mm)). However, there was a drawback of the metallurgy used; the poppet valve could not withstand the stress of sustained high-speed operation (meaning over 100 mph (160 km/h) on production T1s).

The first PRR duplex was the single experimental S1 No. 6100 of 1939. It managed to reach 100.97 mph (162.50 km/h) on level track while pulling a 1,350 short tons (1,220 t; 1,210 long tons) passenger train. Its performance encouraged the PRR to continue to develop duplex steam locomotives. The S1 was built unnecessarily large for her exhibition at the 1939 New York World's Fair until October 1940; therefore, its turning radius prohibited it from operating over most of the PRR network. The 6-4-4-6 design reduced driving set traction to the point that it was especially prone to wheel slip; thus only one Class S1 was built. The PRR returned to Baldwin to develop a duplex design fit for series production. The desire to create a locomotive with comparable power to that of the GG1 remained, though the anticipated range changed. The next duplexes would have a far greater capacity of coal in comparison to water.

The PRR ordered two Baldwin prototypes (Nos. 6110 and 6111) at a cost of $600,000 (equal to $13,788,599 today) on June 26, 1940. Both prototypes had numerous teething problems and were prone to wheelslip if not handled carefully by the engineer, but favorable test reports resulted in a production order for 50 T1s, split between the PRR's own Altoona Works and Baldwin. On December 20, 1944, the PRR Board authorized the purchase of 50 Class T1 locomotives for $14,125,000 ($282,500 per unit, equal to $5,166,706 each today). Baldwin's chief designer, Ralph P. Johnson, was responsible for the mechanical aspects of the new T1 class. Designer Raymond Loewy obtained US Patent D 136,260 for an early T1 conceptual design with a high-mounted cab located over the forward driving set. While that suited Baldwin's objective of making the most distinctive steam locomotive possible, practical considerations led the T1 design to be revised to the conventional cab position with a slight modification of the unique nose design included in Loewy's patent. Raymonds distinctive design of the T1 heavily influenced other engines, most notably the South Australian Railways 520 class. In late 1942 Islington Railway Workshops's chief engineer Frank Hugh Harrison saw the T1 in an American magazine whilst designing the 520 class. Frank was impressed, and the streamlining of the T1 became the basis of the design. The 520 class construction pace was then increased to come out before the T1 to avoid patent claims.

The last production T1 (no. 5549) entered service on August 27, 1946. Engine no. 5539 developed 5,012 hp (3,737 kW), as tested between September 11, 1946, and September 14, 1946, by Chesapeake and Ohio Railway dynamometer car DM-1 while on loan to C&O. In 1944 no. 6110, tested on the stationary test plant in Altoona, developed 6,550 ihp (4,880 kW) in the cylinders at 85 mph (137 km/h). No in-house tests were made with a dynomometer, but estimates from the Altoona test rated 6110's drawbar pull at 4,100 horsepower at 100 mph. No prior class of steam locomotives in numbers could develop over 4,000 drawbar horsepower at this speed, while the only class which could match this figure was the later New York Central Niagaras.

== Nos. 6110 & 6111 ==
Following delivery, the prototypes were placed in limited service between Harrisburg and Chicago. Both engines held 100 mph with upwards of 13 cars, while their tenders let them travel the entire 713 mi (1,147 km) route with only one stop for coal in Millbrook, Ohio. Water stops were unnecessary due to the PRR's use of track pans. The futuristic streamlining lead to the new engines earning the nicknames Flash Gordon (6110), and Buck Rogers (6111). The 'Sharknose' monicker applied to the later production engines and subsequent Baldwin diesel units wasn't widely used, though a December 1942 article of the Times Leader refers to the T1's as Land Dreadnaughts. The aggressive angles of the smokebox prow and accompanying portholes on the lower sides give the impression of an ocean vessel.

The internals of the locomotive's front end could be likened to an automobile, outside of the Sharknose styling. The shrouding over the pilot was higher than on the S1. Along with fixtures such as the air compressor and main reservoir, this "hood" also contained a gearbox housing the main reciprocating motion of the valve gear. The arrangement was essentially a miniaturized version of conventional valve gear, with each cylinder's motion actuated by the opposite crosshead, similar to Young valve gear. Also placed under the hood was an air horn, positioned similarly to that of the S1, for added auditory warning at high speeds. The Pennsylvania passenger-standard 3-chime steam whistle was also used. A Trains Magazine article from 1942 details a run of 6111 with the eastbound Juniata with the Pittsburgh Division engineer using the horn, and the Middle Division engineer using the whistle.

Problems were encountered with poor steaming, placement of sanders, spring equalization, and insufficient lateral motion leading to repeated low-speed derailments on some switches approaching Pittsburgh from the west. Starting in 1943, the T1's were confined to the Ft. Wayne Division, limiting their range to that of the preceding S1. The turntable at Crestline was recently enlarged to a diameter of 110 ft (34 m), making it capable of turning the T1s. It could also accommodate every following class of steam engine the PRR would roster; the S1 would continue to use the wye.

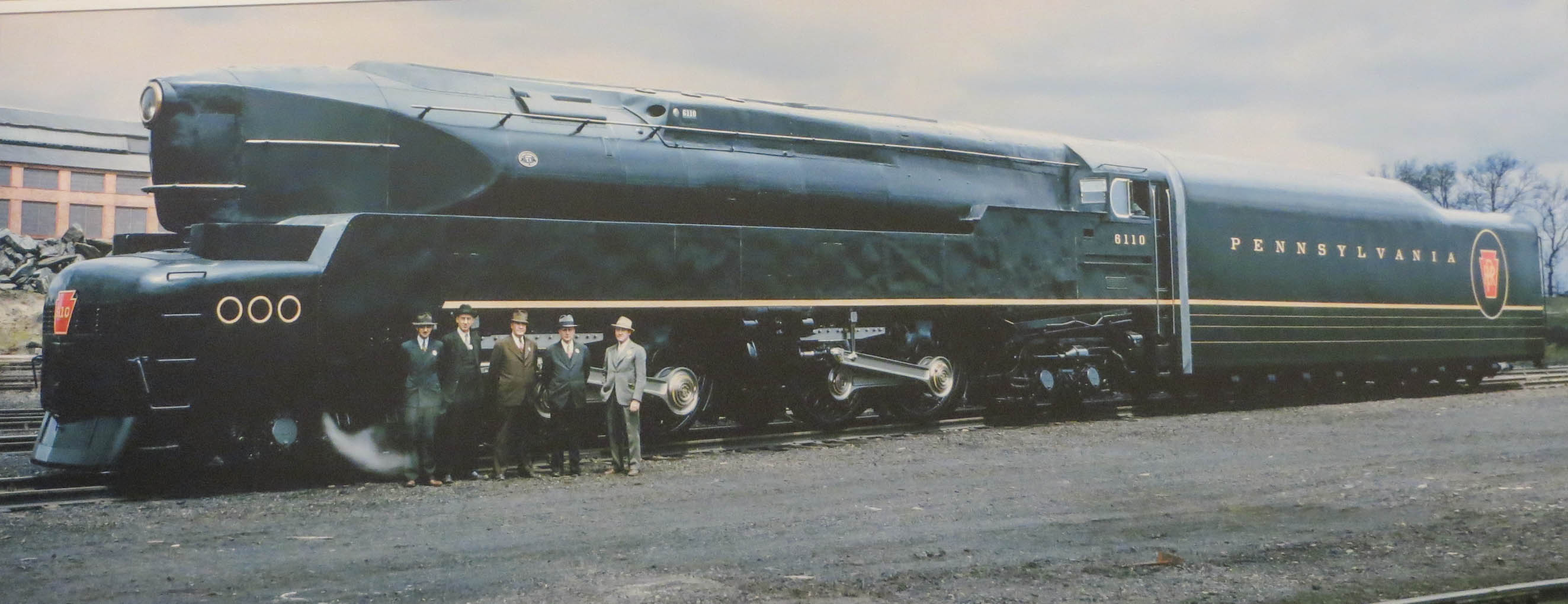
PRR T-1 6110

This transfer revealed flaws in the T1's performance and servicing needs. Due to their complexity relative to other steam locomotive designs, the T1s were difficult to maintain. The Franklin gearbox housing was hidden by the shrouded pilot on the front engine, and squeezed between the cylinders on the rear engine. Skirting over the driving wheels also obstructed the camboxes above the cylinders. These were eventually removed, as per the S1 and Q1, but small cutouts to access the camboxes were made prior to this. Designed to run reliably at speeds of up to 100 mph (160 km/h), the T1s were so powerful that they could easily exceed their designed load and speed limitations, which in turn caused increased wear and tear, particularly to the poppet valves and associated equipment. They were described as "free steaming," meaning they could generally maintain boiler pressure regardless of throttle setting. They were so powerful that violent wheel slip could occur over a wide speed range if the engineer did not handle the throttle carefully; loss of driver traction at high speeds, especially when the T1 was under heavy load while ascending grades, caused damage to the poppet valves. The Franklin Type A valve gear applied to the T1s was designed for continuous speeds at 100 mph, and sprints up to 125 mph (201 km/h). In interviews with historian William L. Withuhn in the 1970s, Franklin engineers Julius Kirchhof and Ray Delano both claimed a Franklin technician charged with determining the cause of frequent poppet valve failures on the T1s saw them operated at speeds of up to 100–110 mph (160–180 km/h) to make up time with short trains of six or seven cars, determining the speed by timing when the train passed mileposts.

Topography on the Ft. Wayne Division meant it was common for engine crews to push their locomotives to make up time. This was no difference to the T1's, but presented new issues for the shop personnel. On top of the challenges of maintaining the valve gear, making repairs was even more troublesome. The one other locomotive with Franklin Type A (also allocated to the Ft. Wayne Division) wasn't powerful enough to challenge the speed threshold of its poppet valves, let alone exceed it. By contrast, the reported speed exploits of the S1 could have been easily remedied due to its use of familiar Walschaerts motion. Thus the multiple unexpected failures lead to the T1's taking longer to return to service. No. 6110 accumulated 120,000 mi (190,000 km) by April 1944, implying a lower monthly average than the S1 or the K4's.

Late 1944 saw a Norfolk & Western J class trialed on the Ft. Wayne Division, at the suggestion of Vice President Symes due to dissatisfaction with the T1's performance. J class No. 610 ran several trains reliably at speeds up to 110 mph. Numerous benefits were displayed over the duplexes, with the J having better acceleration, better steaming on poor coal, and ride quality only outmatched by the S1. The PRR was impressed, but were not sold on the 4-8-4. The J's overall acceleration to 100 mph was lacking compared to the T1, and reports of wheelslip occurred. The biggest concern was the machinery speeds created by the 70 in (1.8 m) driving wheels, and the failure risks. One run with 610 saw a set of valve gear seize up at 110 mph just east of Ft. Wayne, though this was primarily from improper lubrication. While prone to slippage and valve failures, the T1's never experienced such high-speed failures of their reciprocating motion. The 610 was returned to the N&W in early January 1945.

Months later, the prototype T1's had their restriction lifted and resumed running east to Harrisburg. Multiple tests were made with the T1's on increasingly heavy trains. An inspector recorded of 6110 manage a 21 car train at 100 mph on the Middle Division (Harrisburg to Altoona) in adverse weather and still making up time. This same inspector examined 6110 days later slipping violently to a standstill, resulting from a sharp throttle application. While far from perfect designs, the performance of the T1 could vary greatly by the engineer at the controls.

== Nos. 5500 - 5549 ==
Beginning in November 1945, the first production T1's appeared. 5525 to 5549 would be outshopped by Baldwin like the prototypes, while 5500 to 5524 - as well as all 50 tenders, were constructed in Altoona. No. 5524 would be the last steam locomotive built at the Juniata Shops, while the whole class was numbered to follow on from the last batch of K4's. Lessons learned from the prototypes lead to numerous design changes, included revised spring equalization and flatter prows to the smokebox casing. The former was to combat issues of weight distribution, while the latter was done to simplify production, as well as reduce drifting smoke at high speed with lower cutoff. Shrouding from the pilot to the front cylinders had minor changes. The side portholes were retained, with skirting over the driving wheels omitted. The 5500's were all equipped with Boxpok driving wheels, rather than the Baldwin Discs used on the prototypes. With features like duplex drive and poppet valves, the T1's were the largest class of experimental steam locomotive ever built in the United States, as well as being the largest streamlined class of locomotive in size and quantity. Several T1's would be serviced and stationed at Crestline. Unlike the turntable, roundhouse stalls could not accommodate the T1's initially. 15 stalls received a 20 ft (6.1 m) extension in 1946, extending toward the turntable rather than outwards as per the previous stall extension. They were immediately assigned to the "Fleet of Modernism," hauling trains of new lightweight equipment, as well as standard and refurbished heavyweight cars.

Almost as immediately, more problems arose with the T1's. Despite their various improvements, the 50 production T1's were often reported to be worse than the prototypes. This is likely due to the limited service of the prototypes, with much of that time spent on only one division. Not only were the production T1's placed into the same Harrisburg to Chicago service on a more frequent basis, they were also assigned trains to St. Louis and occasionally Detroit. Several divisions worth of crews had insufficient experience with handling the T1's before the first production engines entered service, while others had practically none at all. Some engineers became accustomed to the T1's characteristics, while many others had little time to improve. The influx of T1's also created problems on the maintenance side. Many shops crews similarly lacked the experience to maintain the Franklin gear, let alone repair it. Such difficulties meant double-heading of K4's was not completely eliminated, though their use on higher priority trains did decrease. The T1's regularly racked up over 8,000 miles a month.

The Pennsylvania Railroad continued to promote the T1's as the newest development in steam power. In addition to the Chicago Railroad Fair, T1's made display appearances in Sunbury, Reading, and Atlantic City. Promotional print material, as well as the film Clear Track Ahead shows the T1's being the new face of the railroad, alongside the GG1 electrics and recently acquired diesels.

As per the prototypes, two of the production T1's were involved in comparative tests with foreign motive power, though this time the duplexes were visiting. First were trials on the Chesapeake & Ohio, a possible second home for the T1's being more loyal to coal and coal-burning locomotives. 5511 and 5539 were chosen for tests, though the former was quickly recalled back to the Pennsylvania. Despite testing the locomotives, the C&O placed them on normal service trains and found them quite favorable. Rather than slipping, the two instances of failure in the T1's performance was in stalling. One instance saw a recovery of 30 seconds, while the other found the T1 unable to start its train which was overloaded. Most of these were down to the T1's tractive effort lacking compared to the C&O's existing J-3 4-8-4's, which were equipped with boosters to further enhance their starting capabilities.

5511 was involved in further trials on the Norfolk & Western in June 1948. Design changes made to the T1's from the prototypes were balanced out by the J class, no. 604, having an increased boiler pressure of 300 psi (2,100 kPa) (no. 610's previous comparisons were made using the original pressure of 275 psi (1,900 kPa)). From June 6 to 14, 5511 was run over the Radford Division (Roanoke to Christiansburg), with its performance compared to 604's previous runs shortly after its increase in boiler pressure. Tonnage was adjusted due to the T1's lower tractive effort, though its higher drivers hindered its climbing ability. Further tests from June 17 to 28 had 5511 tested alongside 604, running on the Norfolk Division (Poe to Suffolk) with 21 car trains. Runs were made up to 65 and 75 mph (105 and 121 km/h), and a minimum of 85 mph (137 km/h), the latter condition being the only case in which the T1 outperformed the J. In addition to better fuel economy, the T1 spent approximately 30% of the 65 mile stretch at speeds above 85 mph, compared to the J's 12%. While these results echo the PRR's reports on the J's acceleration, the T1 was simply unsuitable for most terrain and tonnage on the N&W.

== Modifications ==
Before the last engines had even been delivered, the T1's began receiving modified pilots to further improve maintenance. The streamlined shroud and portholes were replaced with a more conventional pilot with footsteps, akin to the Q2 and S2 classes. The numberplate was moved to the smokebox, later augmented by an additional headlight on the pilot air compressor covering. The marker lights were also repositioned to the tapered sides of the smokebox.

Some divisions also cut down the shrouding on the tender to the tops of the tender deck. The chronology for these changes is unclear, with some engines recorded with their original pilots in the 1950's. Both prototypes did receive their changes to the front end by 1948, though the shape of their smokeboxes continued to set them apart. A further internal change was made to the cylinders of a select few engines. To reduce their propensity to slip, 6111 was experimentally fitted with 1/2 in (13 mm) steel lining of all four of its cylinders, reducing each bore to 18.75 in (476 mm). This reduced the tractive effort from nearly 65,000 lbf (290 kN) to just over 58,000 lbf (260 kN). 6110 was similarly treated, as were 7 of the production T1's.

Two T1's received different alternative forms of valve gear. 5500 was rebuilt following an accident in 1948 with Franklin Type B-2 valve gear, replacing the original oscillating cams with rotary cams. This removed the complex arrangement of gearboxes between and ahead of the cylinders, thus simplifying maintenance and improving performance. Franklin Type B had been applied to K4 3478 that same year, though 5500's arrangement differed slightly. The original valves and cams remained in situ, while the rotary shafts were modified with bridges to drive the two pairs of ports at each end of the cylinder and associated cams. This led to the "B-2" designation, making 5500 the only US steam locomotive to receive two different forms of poppet valve gear. The following year in 1949 had 5547 lose its poppet valves entirely, receiving 12-inch piston valves and Walschaerts valve gear. Cutoff was not reduced, as per the prior S1 and K5 classes, though 1/2 inch cylinder lining was applied. As the only T1 without poppet valves, 5547 was reclassified as a T1a. The change of valve gear improved maintenance, though no substantial changes in performance were noted.

== Fate ==
The T1's development was paralleled on two fronts. On one side was the development of a steam turbine locomotive, eventually designated as Class V1 resembling the later Chesepeake & Ohio M-1, albeit with a 4-8-0+4-8-0 wheel arrangement. This locomotive spent years in development, but never materialized, though did culminate in the construction of the S2 of 1944. On the other side, the Pennsylvania Railroad attempted multiple times to order diesel-electrics from the Electro Motive Division. This finally culminated in the arrival of two E7A's in 1945, just months after the T1 production order was placed. Subsequent orders to EMD, as well as for equivalent ALCo and Baldwin products, made the brand new T1's redundant for their intended roles. This was exacerbated by 1946 being the first year the Pennsylvania recorded a loss, beginning the postwar decline in passenger traffic.

When the PRR Board decided to dieselize all first-class prime trains in 1948, most T1s were downgraded to other duties. These were mail and express trains, as well as secondary passenger trains outside of the Blue Ribbon Fleet. Among the last named trains regularly assigned to the T1's was the Admiral. Their design characteristics, as well as the abundance of remaining K4's, made them unsuitable for slower passenger trains with frequent stops, moreso than other passenger locomotives. Inquiries were made about converting them to dual-service, using them on freight trains as well as passenger trains like numerous 4-8-4's. This too was a dead-end; freight on the PRR was either too heavy or too slow for the T1 capabilities. By 1950, T1's were no longer running through services to Chicago, St. Louis, or Cincinnati, though some remained as standby or protection power in the event of a diesel set failing. Some of them were withdrawn from passenger service in 1949 and placed in storage. 1952 saw all of them out of service, being officially stricken from the roster by the end of 1953. They were scrapped between 1951 and 1956.

== No. 5550 ==
In 2014, a non-profit group known as The T1 Trust began building a brand new T1 from the ground up, using the original plans with subtle performance improvements where necessary. The T1 Trust's goal is to provide mainline excursion service. The T1 Trust's cost estimate to build T1 number 5550 is $10 million, with an expected completion date of 2030 (This total has since been reduced to a bit more than $7 million, as a used PRR long haul tender has been acquired in lieu of new construction).

The construction of 5550 is also following construction and financing methods pioneered by the LNER Peppercorn Class A1 60163 Tornado project. The first piece of the locomotive, the keystone-shaped number plate, was cast in April 2014, followed by the first minor component, a driving spring link pin, in October 2014. Major components completed as of March 2019 include two Boxpok drivers, the prow, cab, third-course boiler and fire door. Front tube sheet construction was under way by a fabricator in St. Louis, Missouri. By 2026, the full boiler and frame were complete, and were planned to be joined in a facility in Dennison, Ohio later that year.

== In media ==
- A computer-generated version of a T1 was seen in the 2004 film Lemony Snicket's A Series of Unfortunate Events.
- In the computer games Pathologic 2 and Pathologic 3, this locomotive is used for freight transportation and towing heavy artillery.

== See also ==
- South Australian Railways 520 class, an Australian locomotive with similar streamlining style.
- LNER Peppercorn Class A1
