= Franklin Balmar =

Defunct fabrication company

Franklin Balmar Corporation was a fabrication company in Woodberry, Baltimore, Maryland. It was a subcontractor for the Manhattan Project.

== History ==
It was incorporated in 1917 as the Franklin Railway Supply Company. In 1954 they moved their N. A. Strand Division from Chicago to Baltimore. They diversified into the aerospace sector making the aluminum skin for airplanes.

In 1967, Aero-Chatillon Corporation purchased a controlling stake of the company. In 1969, with Franklin-Balmar remaining a division, Aero-Chatillon became Macrodyne-Chatillon Corporation through a merger with Macrodyne, Inc. and Shinn Industries, Inc., which became Macrodyne Industries in 1974.
