= Venarey-les-Laumes =

- Commune
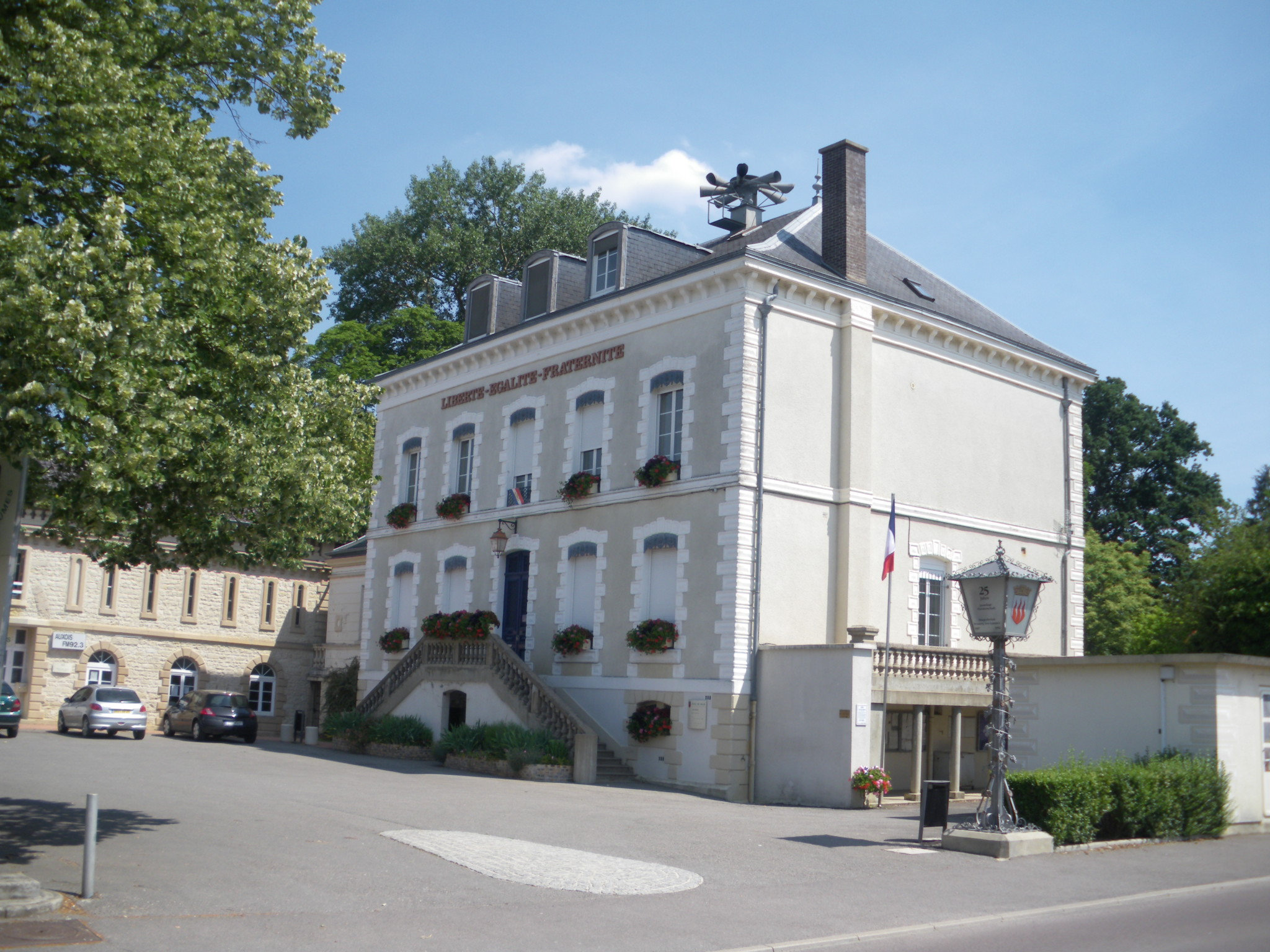
- Town hall

- Coat of arms
- Location of Venarey-les-Laumes
- Location within France Location within Bourgogne-Franche-Comté
- Coordinates: 47°32′34″N 4°26′45″E
- Country: France
- Region: Bourgogne-Franche-Comté
- Department: Côte-d'Or
- Arrondissement: Montbard
- Canton: Montbard
- Intercommunality: Pays d'Alésia et de la Seine

Government
  - Mayor (2020–2026): Patrick Molinoz (PRG)
- Area^{1}: 10.23 km^{2} (3.95 sq mi)
- Elevation: 236 m (774 ft)
- Highest elevation: 423 m (1,388 ft)
- Lowest elevation: 228 m (748 ft)
- Population (2023): 2,747
  - Density: 268.5/km^{2} (695.5/sq mi)
- Time zone: UTC+01:00 (CET)
  - Summer (DST): UTC+02:00 (CEST)
- INSEE/Postal code: 21663 /21150
- ^{1} French Land Register data, which excludes lakes, ponds, glaciers > 1 km^{2} (0.386 sq mi or 247 acres) and river estuaries.

Venarey-les-Laumes (French pronunciation: [vənaʁɛ le lom]) is a commune in the Côte-d'Or department in eastern France.

== Population ==
Historical population

Year	Pop.	±% p.a.
1793	511	—
1876	1,002	+0.81%
1901	1,544	+1.74%
1946	3,080	+1.55%
1962	3,294	+0.42%
1968	3,463	+0.84%
1968	3,463	+0.00%
1975	3,347	−0.49%

Year	Pop.	±% p.a.
1982	3,450	+0.43%
1990	3,544	+0.34%
1999	3,274	−0.88%
2007	3,052	−0.87%
2012	2,906	−0.98%
2017	2,884	−0.15%
2023	2,747	−0.81%

Source: EHESS and INSEE (1968-2023)

== See also ==
- Communes of the Côte-d'Or department
