= Hobart station (Indiana) =

Disused train station in Hobart, Indiana

Hobart, IN
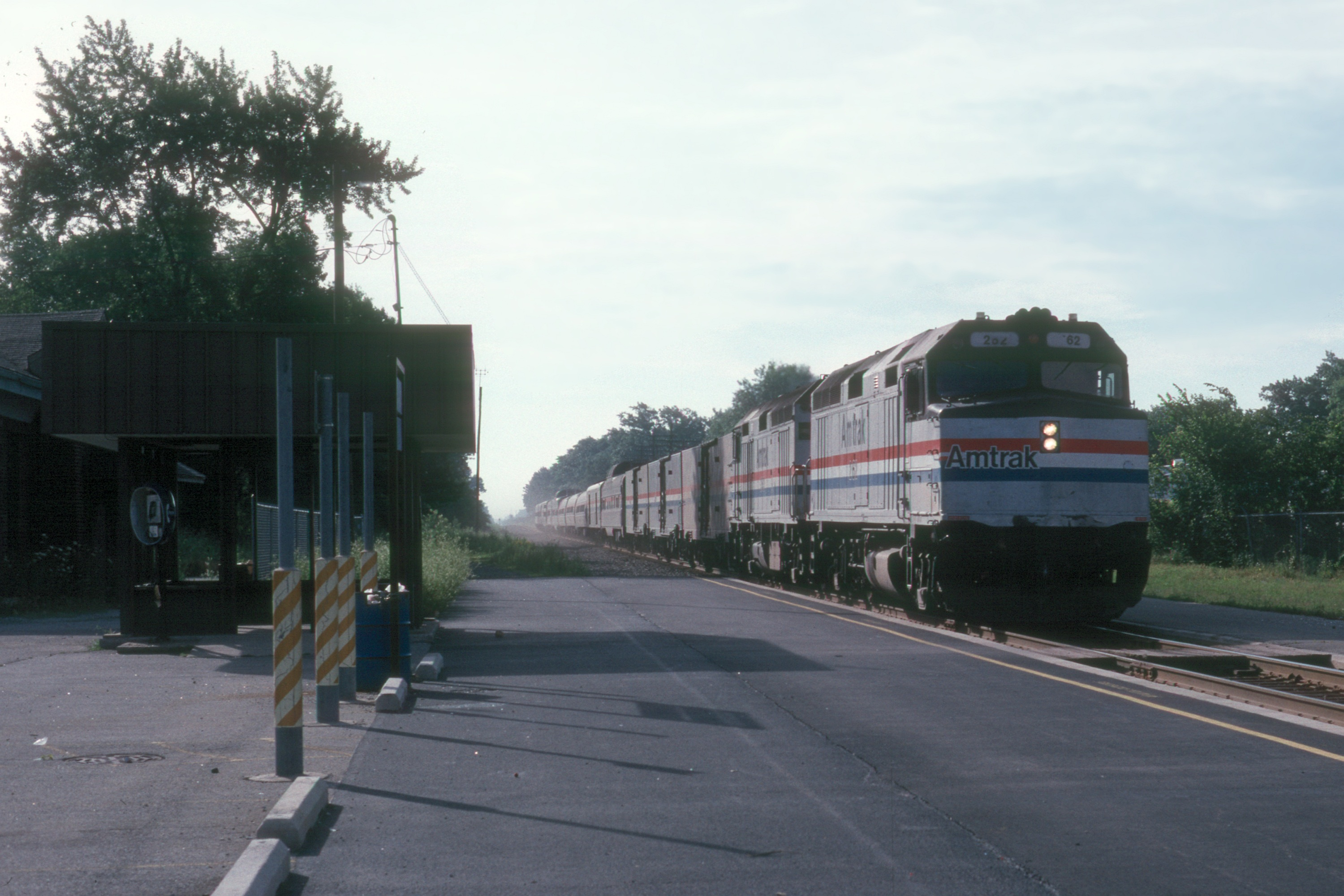
- A westbound Amtrak train (either the Broadway Limited or Capitol Limited) passing through Hobart station in July 1990

General information
- Location: 1001 Lillian Street, Hobart, Indiana
- Line: Pittsburgh, Fort Wayne and Chicago Railway
- Platforms: 1
- Tracks: 1

History
- Opened: 1858
- Closed: May 3, 1991
- Rebuilt: 1911

Former services
Preceding station	Amtrak	Following station
Gary (Broadway) toward Chicago	Calumet	Wheeler toward Valparaiso
Preceding station	Pennsylvania Railroad	Following station
Gary (Broadway) toward Chicago	Main Line	Wheeler toward New York or Exchange Place
New Chicago toward Chicago	Valparaiso Local	Wheeler toward Valparaiso
- Pennsylvania Railroad Station
- U.S. National Register of Historic Places
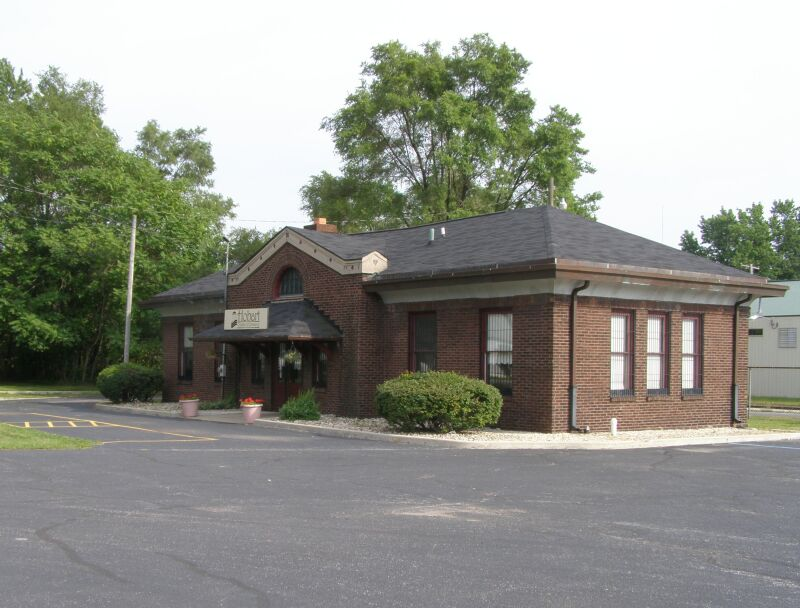
- The former Pennsylvania Railroad depot on July 22, 2010
- Interactive map of Pennsylvania Railroad Station
- Location: 1001 Lillian St., Hobart, Indiana
- Coordinates: 41°32′3″N 87°14′49″W
- Built: 1911
- Architect: Price & McDanahan
- NRHP reference No.: 84001070
- Added to NRHP: March 1, 1984
Location

Hobart, also known as The Pennsy Depot, is a disused train station in Hobart, Indiana. It was built in 1911 and listed on the National Register of Historic Places in 1984 as the Pennsylvania Railroad Station.

The first railroad to reach Hobart in 1858 was the Pittsburgh, Fort Wayne and Chicago Railway (PFW&C) which later became part of the Pennsylvania Railroad. This was followed by the New York, Chicago & St. Louis (NYC&StL) or ‘Nickel Plate’ in 1882. The Elgin, Joliet and Eastern Railway (EJ&E) crossed both of these line in Hobart in 1888. The EJ&E maintained crossing towers at each crossing. The ‘Ho Tower” was at the Nickel Plate Crossing on the south side and the ‘Bart Tower” at the PFW&C crossing on the east side of town.

The first PFW&C depot was made of wood in 1858 and burned down. The second depot was removed in 1911 to make way for the 3rd Street – Highway 51 crossing and the new brick ‘Pennsy Depot’ constructed.

The station was designed by Price & McDanahan in a Colonial Revival style using the local pressed brick. Its outstanding features include the gabled porticoes, curved soffits, ceramic-tile inserts and the semicircular transom windows. It was closed when passenger service ended to Hobart. The ‘Save Our Station Committee of the Hobart Historical Society obtained ownership in 1983. It was transferred to the City of Hobart in 2004. It was a craft shop for several years. In July 2010, the Hobart Chamber of Commerce was using the building for offices.

== Bibliography ==
- Ball, T. H. (1900). Northwestern Indiana from 1800 to 1900. Chicago: Donohue & Henneberry. ISBN 9780722208106.
- Grant, H. Roger; Bohi, Charles W. (1978). The Country Railroad Station in America. Boulder, Colorado: Pruett Publishing Co. ISBN 9780871085238.
- Hobart Gazette. August 26, 1910.
- "Hobart History Advocate". No. 3. Hobart Historical Society. 1983. Clippings and photo files
- Earle, William (1934). "11: The Early History of Northern Lake County". In Old Settlers' Association (ed.). History of Lake County. Crown Point. p. 54.
- Howatt, W. F. (1915). A Standard History of Lake County, Indiana, and the Calumet Region. Vol. 1. Chicago: Lewis Publishing Co. p. 459.
- Moore, Powell (1959). The Calumet Region. Indianapolis, Indiana: Indiana Historical Bureau. ASIN B0007DN8I6.
