= Warsaw station (Indiana) =

US rail station

Warsaw, IN
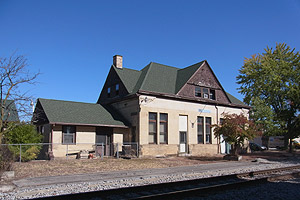
- The former Warsaw station building in 2015

General information
- Location: 218 South Lake Street; Warsaw, Indiana
- Coordinates: 41.2362°N 85.8587°W

History
- Opened: 1893 (PRR); October 27, 1985 (Amtrak)
- Closed: c. 1971; November 11, 1990
- Original company: Pennsylvania Railroad

Former services
Preceding station	Amtrak	Following station
Valparaiso toward Chicago	Broadway Limited	Fort Wayne toward New York
Valparaiso toward Chicago	Capitol Limited	Fort Wayne toward Washington, D.C.
Preceding station	Pennsylvania Railroad	Following station
Atwood toward Chicago	Main Line	Winona Lake toward New York or Exchange Place

Warsaw station is a former train station in Warsaw, Indiana.

== History ==
The station site was established as a depot by the Pittsburgh, Fort Wayne and Chicago Railway. The brick station building was constructed by the Pennsylvania Railroad in 1893. It was served by several of the railroad's named trains, including the Manhattan Limited and Admiral. Trains ceased to serve Warsaw by 1971 when Amtrak assumed most passenger operations in the United States.

On October 27, 1985, Amtrak added the station as a stop on their Broadway Limited and Capitol Limited lines. Services ended after November 11, 1990, when trains were rerouted further north.
