= Gary station (Pennsylvania Railroad) =

Railway station in Gary, Indiana

Gary, IN
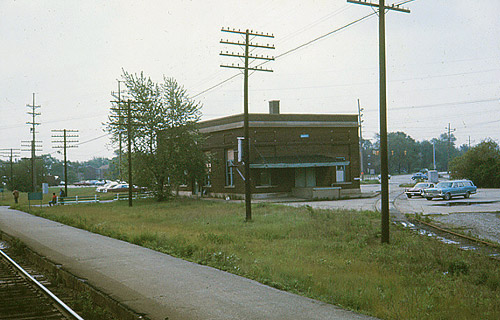
- Gary station in June 1978

General information
- Location: 5th Street and Chase Street; Gary, Indiana
- Coordinates: 41.6028°N 87.3758°W
- Lines: Pennsylvania Railroad; Conrail

History
- Opened: c. 1907
- Closed: May 3, 1991

Former services
Preceding station	Amtrak	Following station
Indiana Harbor toward Chicago	Calumet	Gary (Broadway) toward Valparaiso
Chicago Terminus	Broadway Limited (until 1979)	Valparaiso toward New York
Hammond–Whiting toward Chicago	Capitol Limited (until 1985)	Valparaiso toward Washington, D.C.
Preceding station	Pennsylvania Railroad	Following station
Clarke toward Chicago	Main Line	Gary (Broadway) toward New York or Exchange Place
Buffington toward Chicago	Valparaiso Local	Gary (Broadway) toward Valparaiso
Location

Gary station was a railway station in Gary, Indiana. It was located at 5th and Chase Streets, initially serving the Pennsylvania Railroad.

== History ==
Gary first appeared on Pennsylvania Railroad time cards on June 23, 1907, a year after the town was founded. It was served by several of the railroad's named trains, including the Liberty Limited, General, Trail Blazer, Manhattan Limited, and Admiral.

Amtrak took over most passenger rail operations in 1971, but the Calumet continued to be operated by Penn Central Transportation (the successor to the Pennsylvania Railroad) until 1979. That same year, the Broadway Limited was rerouted around Gary. The Capitol Limited was inaugurated in 1981, which reinstated intercity services to the station. However, Gary was again dropped on April 28, 1985. Amtrak service ceased entirely after May 3, 1991 when the Calumet was discontinued.

== See also ==
- Union Station (Gary, Indiana) — former joint Baltimore and Ohio Railroad and New York Central Railroad depot
- Gary Metro Center — modern South Shore Line station in Gary
