= Englewood Union Station =

Rail station (1852–1970s)

Englewood
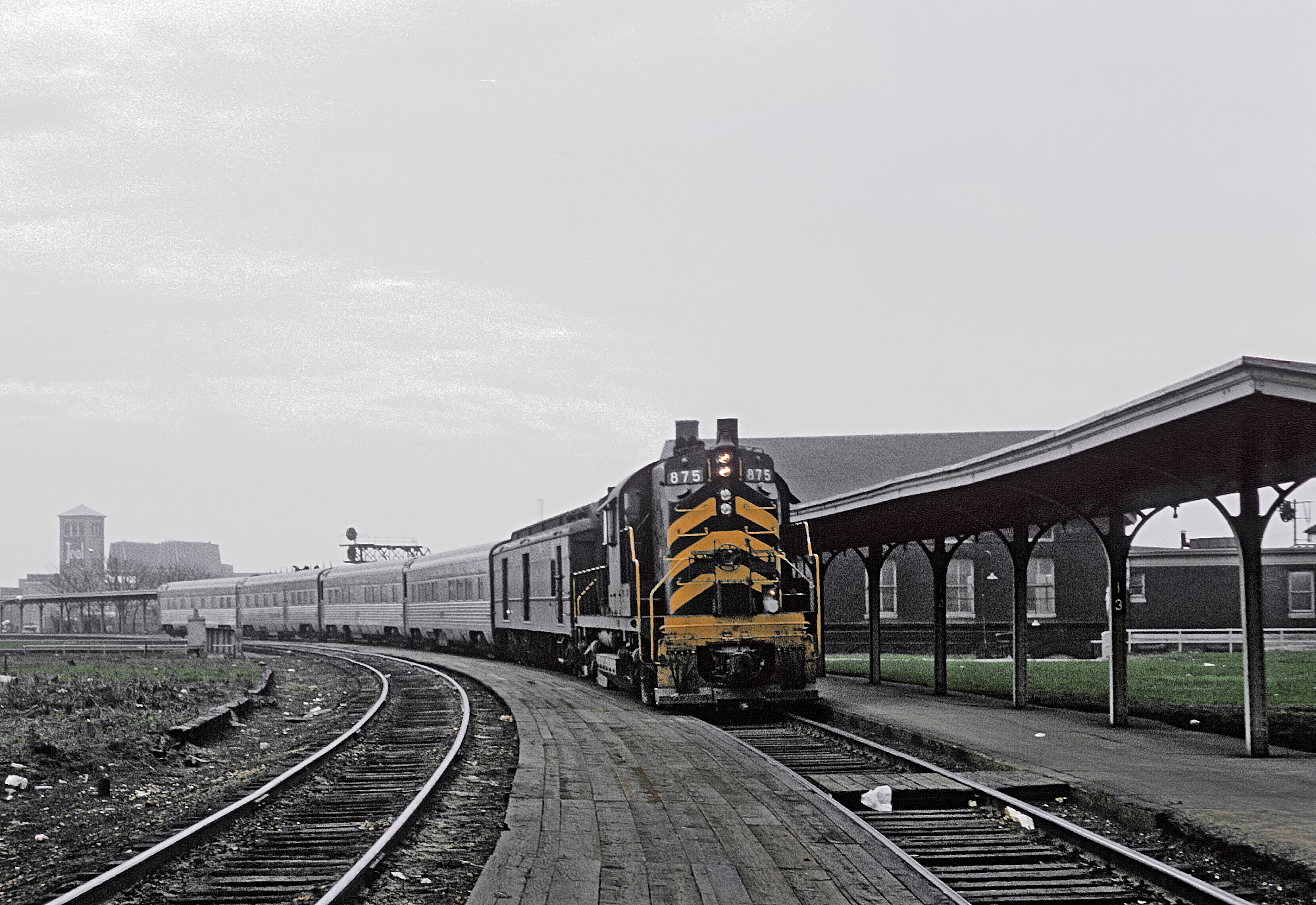
- NKP RS36 875; Train 5, The City of Chicago at Englewood on April 21, 1965

General information
- Location: 63rd Street and State Street; Chicago, Illinois
- Coordinates: 41.7797°N 87.6269°W
- Connections: Chicago "L": Englewood branch at Harvard; Dan Ryan branch at 63rd

History
- Opened: February 20, 1852 (Northern Indiana and Chicago Railroad)
- Closed: 1978

Former services
Preceding station	New York Central Railroad	Following station
Chicago Terminus	Main Line	South Chicago toward New York
Chicago Terminus	Chicago – Cairo	South Chicago toward Cairo
Chicago Terminus	Chicago – Hammond	South Chicago toward Hammond
Chicago Terminus	Chesterton Local	Park Manor toward Chesterton
Preceding station	Pennsylvania Railroad	Following station
Chicago Terminus	Main Line	Cottage Grove Avenue toward New York or Exchange Place
Garfield Boulevard toward Chicago	Valparaiso Local	Cottage Grove Avenue toward Valparaiso
Chicago Terminus	Chicago – Columbus	Cottage Grove Avenue toward Columbus
Chicago Terminus	Chicago – Cincinnati	Cottage Grove Avenue toward Cincinnati
Chicago Terminus	Chicago – Louisville	Cottage Grove Avenue toward Louisville
Preceding station	Chicago, Rock Island and Pacific Railroad	Following station
Chicago Terminus	Main Line	Washington Heights toward Colorado Springs
Chicago Terminus	Suburban Service	Normal Park toward Joliet
Preceding station	Nickel Plate Road	Following station
Chicago Terminus	Main Line	Hammond toward Buffalo
Preceding station	Chicago and Eastern Illinois Railroad	Following station
31st Street toward Chicago	Main Line (1904–1913)	Kensington toward Evansville
31st Street toward Chicago	Chicago – St. Louis (1904–1913)	Kensington toward St. Louis
Location

Englewood Union Station was a major rail junction and passenger depot in the Englewood neighborhood of Chicago, Illinois. Four railroads served the station in its prime – the Chicago, Rock Island and Pacific Railroad, the New York Central Railroad, the Pennsylvania Railroad, and New York, Chicago and St. Louis Railroad, which operated over the New York Central via trackage rights. The station closed in 1978 when the Rock Island closed intercity rail operations and intermediate stops between LaSalle Street and Gresham. There are presently no plans to reopen the station.

== History ==
Englewood Union Station stood at the intersection of several rail lines:

- The New York Central (NYC) and the Rock Island shared trackage from Englewood to the north into LaSalle Street Station. At Englewood, they split: the Rock Island headed southwest to Joliet and western Illinois and Iowa, the New York Central east into Indiana.
- The Pennsylvania Railroad's (PRR) Pittsburgh, Fort Wayne and Chicago Railway crossed the Rock Island at this junction. To the north, its trackage headed into Union Station. The PRR then closely paralleled the NYC for several miles into Indiana.

Three-fourths of a mile west of this station, at 63rd Street and Wallace Street, stood another union station, nicknamed "Little Englewood."

The station itself stood near the corner of 63rd and State Streets and opened in 1898.

The station was also served by the Chicago and Eastern Illinois Railroad from 1904 to 1913, during a period of control by the St. Louis–San Francisco Railway.

Englewood was the first stop eastbound, and penultimate such westbound, for both PRR's Broadway Limited and NYC's 20th Century Limited. Both trains would leave their respective terminals in Chicago, stop to embark passengers at Englewood, and leave the station simultaneously, each racing the other for several miles before they diverged.

At its peak the station serviced 52 of the 100 largest cities in the United States.

The westbound Rockets of the Rock Island also stopped at Englewood. Connections could be made at Englewood between any of the railroads at that intersection. Rock Island ran their intercity services here as late at 1978.

Connections to the Chicago "L" could be made at the Harvard station on the Englewood branch (now a part of the Green Line), and from 1969 until 1978, at the 63rd station on the Dan Ryan branch (now a part of the Red Line).

Upon the decline of intercity passenger traffic, and PRR and NYC's merger into Penn Central (and that railroad's bankruptcy and reorganization into Conrail), much of the trackage has been removed, and the commuter trains on the Metra Rock Island District no longer stop at the station, which was closed in the late 1970s. The former tracks of the Pennsylvania are now owned by the Norfolk Southern Railway and still carry freight and intercity Amtrak passengers to Union Station. The station was demolished in the late 70s, but some scattered remnants are visible around the railroad overpass near 63rd Street and State Street. The station is currently the site of the Norfolk Southern 63rd Street intermodal transfer terminal.

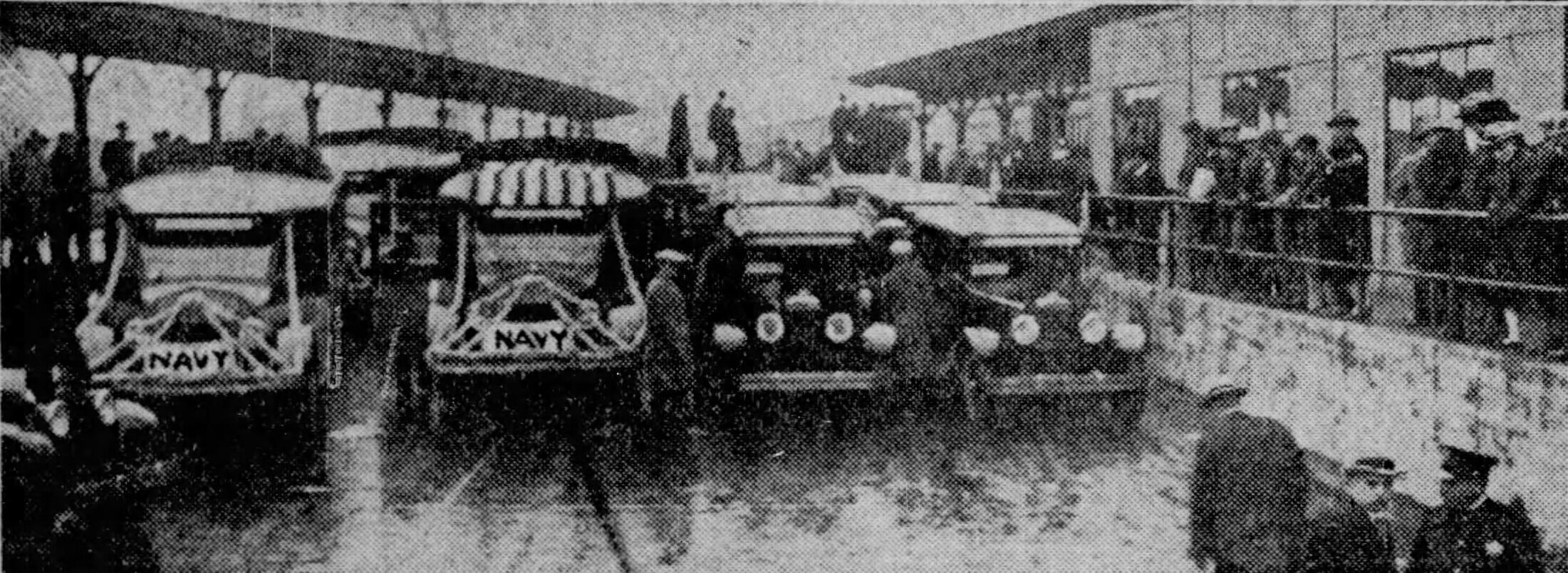
Scene at the station for the arrival of the 1926 Navy Midshipmen football team in November 1926 ahead of the Army–Navy Game at Soldier Field

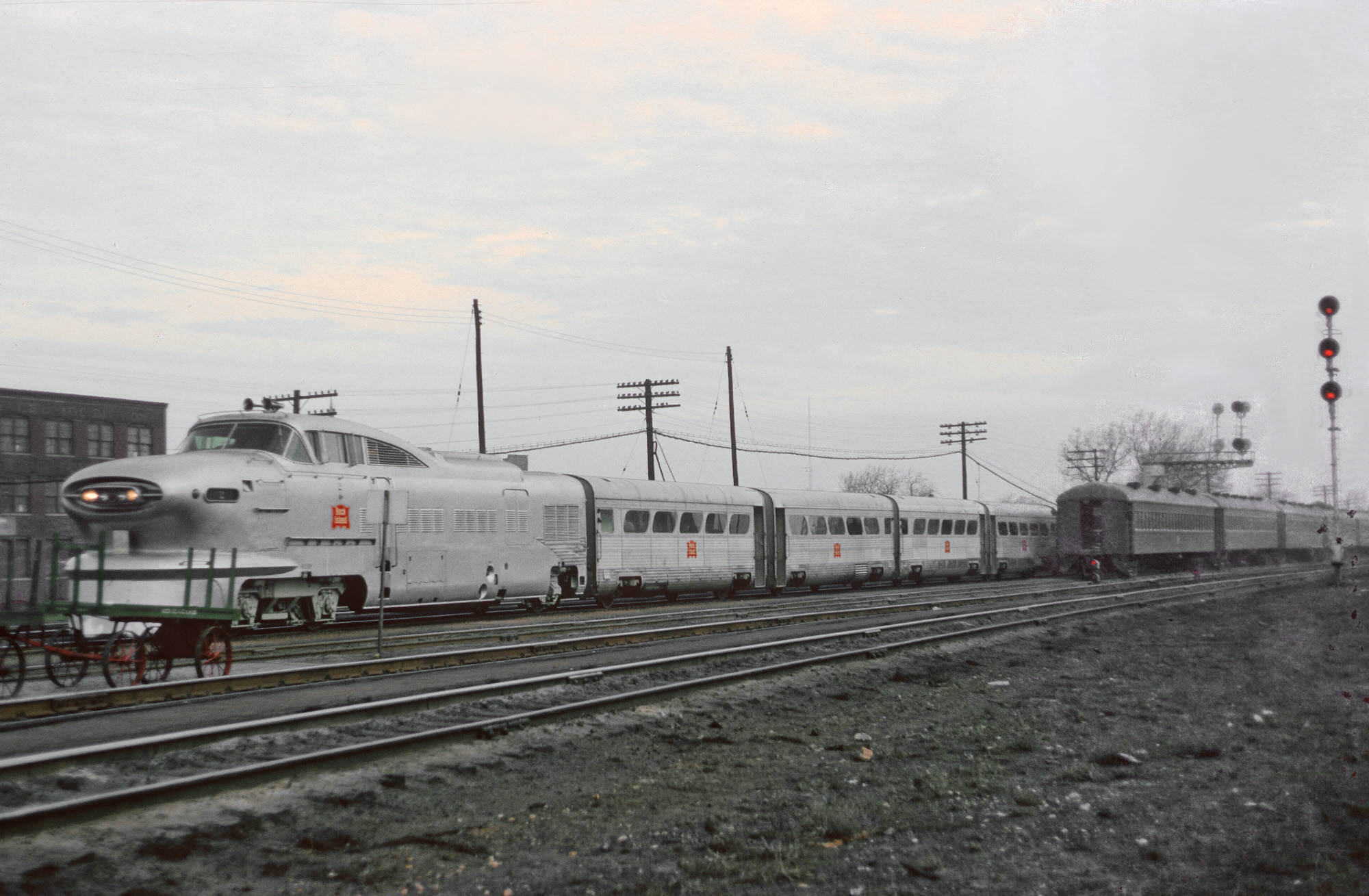
A Chicago, Rock Island and Pacific Railroad Aerotrain at Englewood on April 21, 1965.

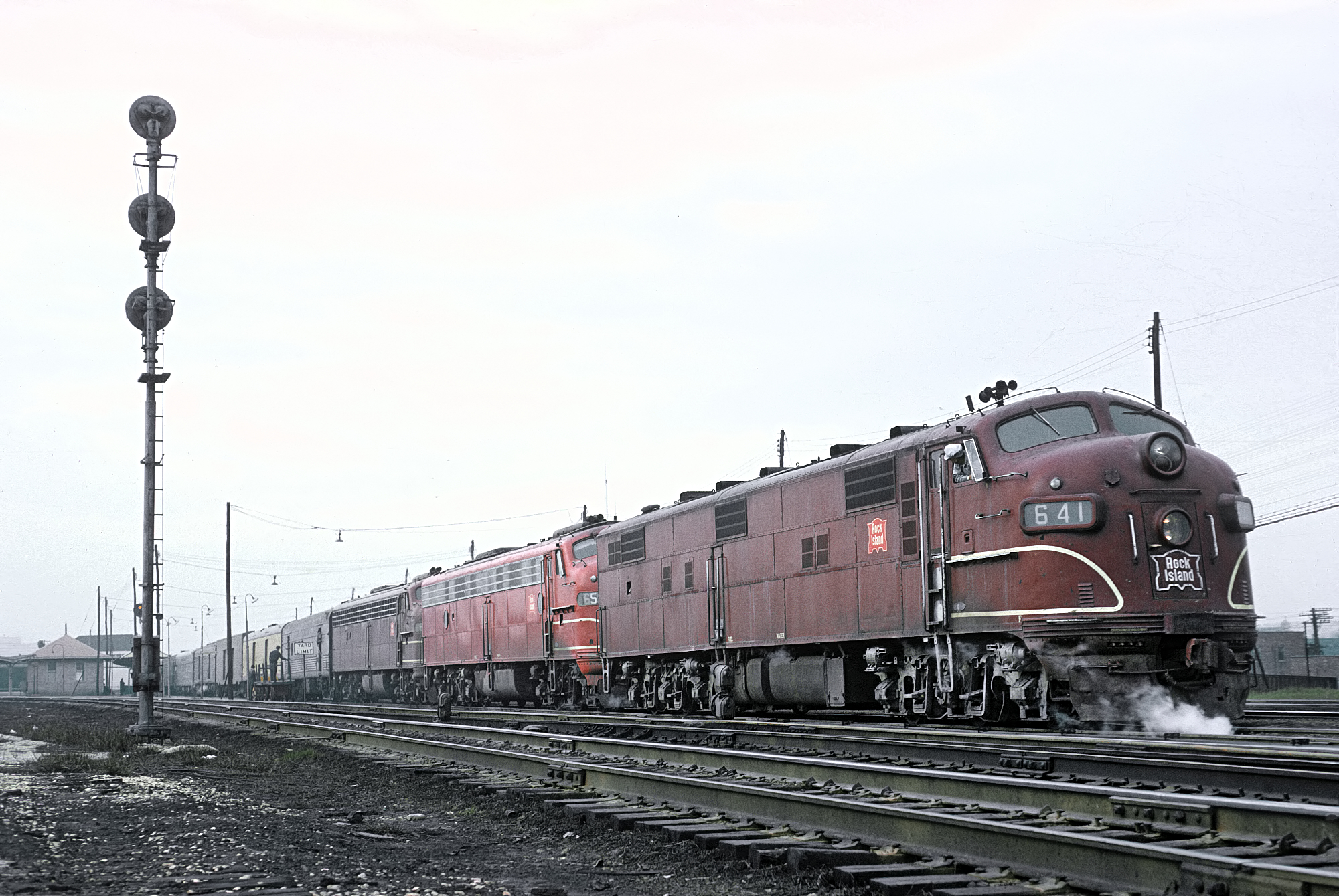
The Rocky Mountain Rocket at Englewood on April 21, 1965.
