= Calumet (train) =

Former Amtrak commuter train

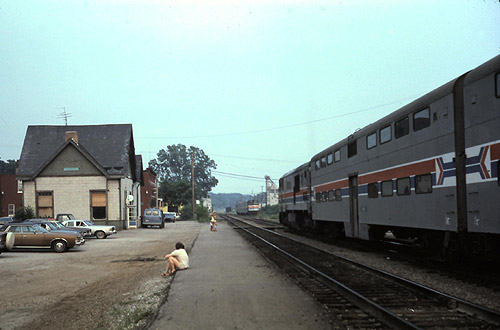
- The Calumet and Indiana Connection at Valparaiso in 1980

Overview
- Service type: Commuter rail
- Status: Discontinued
- Predecessor: Unnamed Conrail service; previously Penn Central Railroad, Pennsylvania Railroad
- First service: August 30, 1869; October 29, 1979 (Amtrak)
- Last service: May 3, 1991
- Former operator: Amtrak

Route
- Termini: Chicago; Valparaiso
- Stops: 7
- Distance travelled: 44 miles (71 km)
- Average journey time: 1 hour 20 minutes
- Service frequency: Daily (weekdays only)
- Train numbers: 321, 324 (Indiana Connection); 322, 323 (Calumet)

Technical
- Track gauge: 4 ft 8 1/2 in (1,435 mm)

The Calumet, also commonly called the Valpo Local, was a 43.6-mile (70.2 km) passenger train route operated by Amtrak between Chicago and Valparaiso, Indiana. Despite Amtrak's mandate to provide only intercity service, the Calumet was a commuter train. Transferred from Conrail in 1979, the full route was shared with Amtrak's Broadway Limited until 1990; the Calumet was discontinued the next year.

== History ==
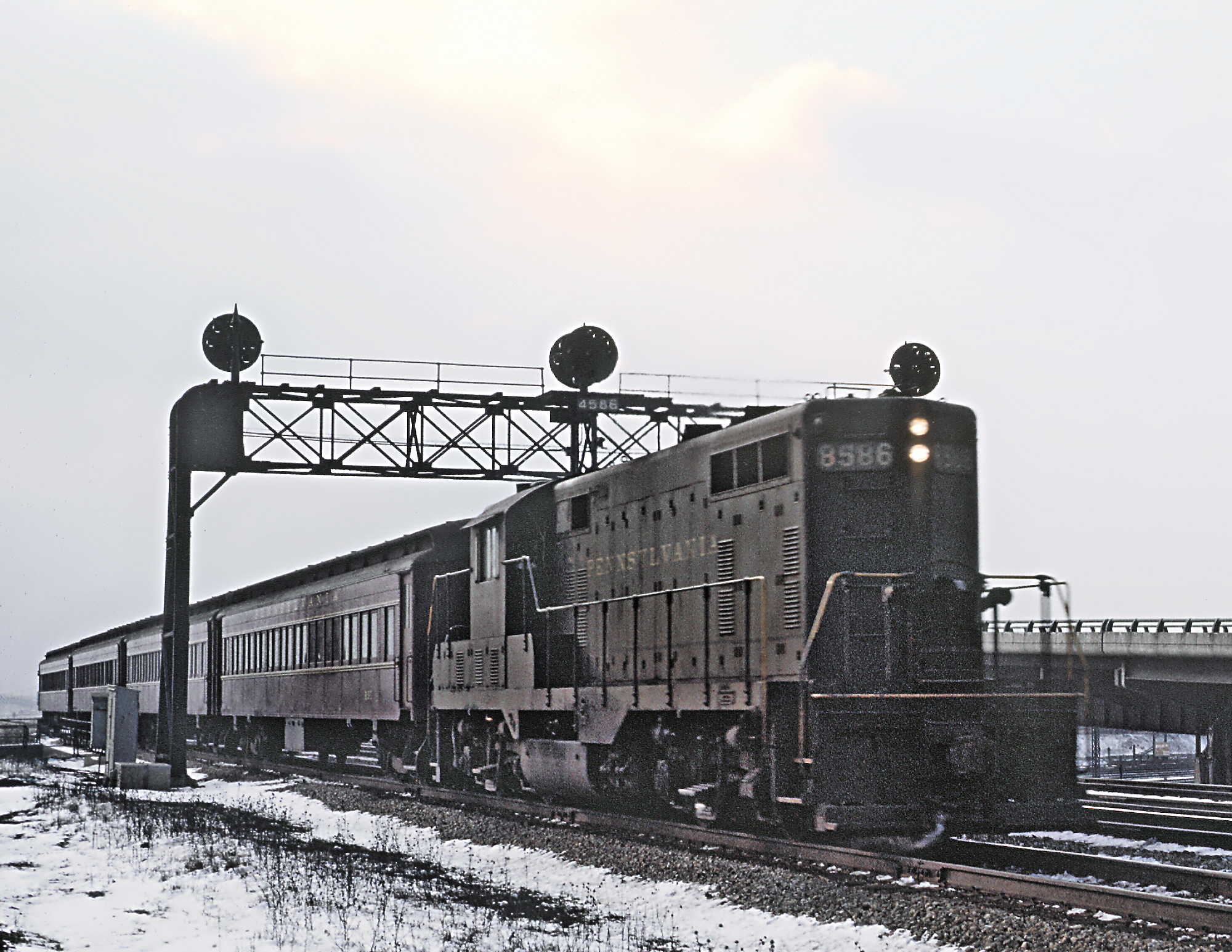
Valparaiso local train entering Chicago in 1964

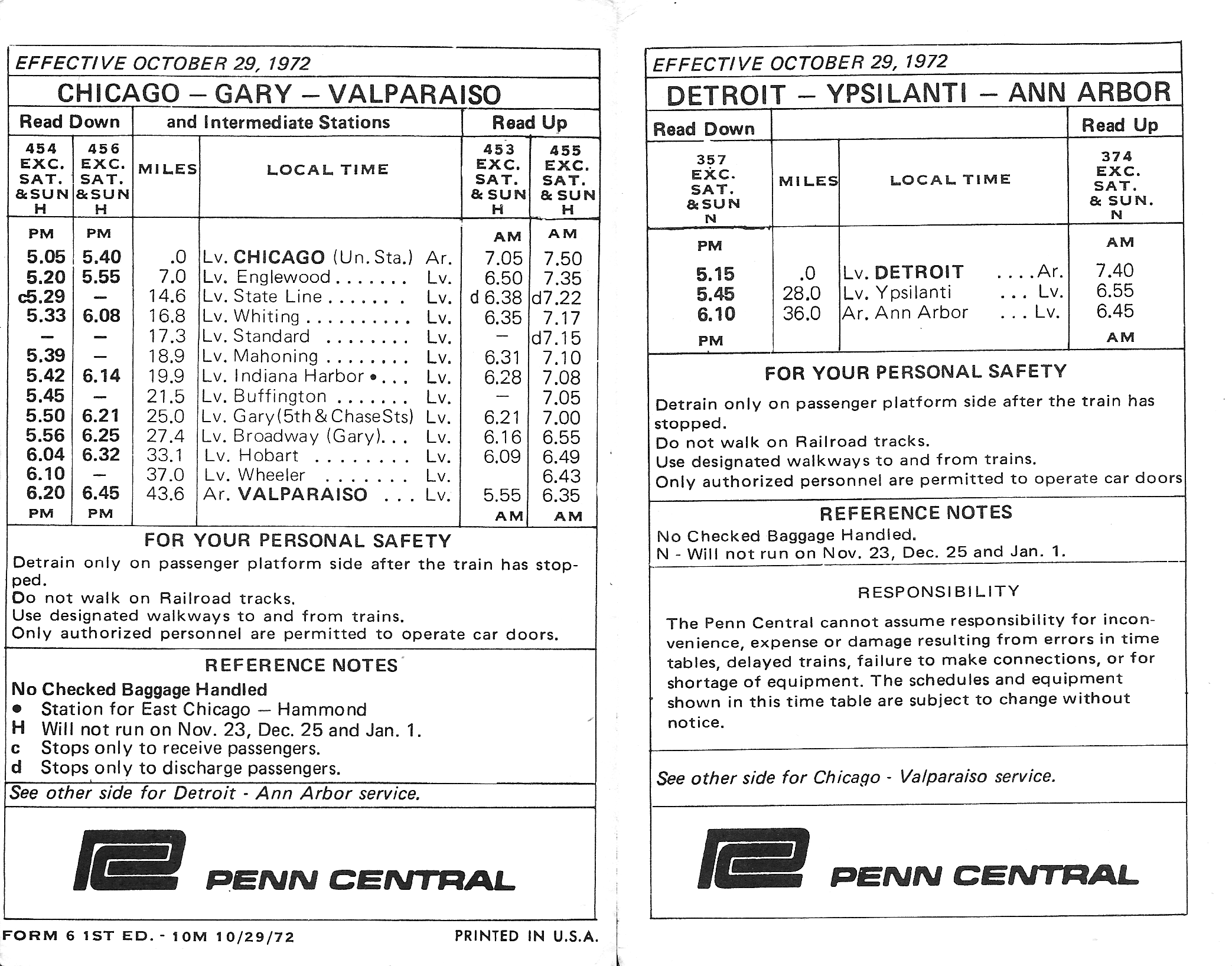
October 1972 Penn Central timetable showing the Valparaiso local service

The service first ran August 30, 1869, by the Pennsylvania Railroad on its Pittsburgh, Fort Wayne and Chicago Railway, its main line from Pittsburgh west to Chicago. It was formally called the Chicago–Valparaiso Accommodation, but was usually colloquially referred to as the "Valpo Local" or "The Dummy". From April 1, 1871, until January 1, 1920, the Pennsylvania Company operated the line. After that it returned to direct operation by the Pennsylvania Railroad until February 1, 1968, when the PRR was merged into Penn Central Transportation. By that point, the route operated as a rush-hour commuter service, with two trains traveling from Valparaiso to Chicago at 5:55 AM and 6:35 AM and two trains returning from Chicago to Valparaiso at 5:00 PM and 5:40 PM.

With the May 1, 1971, startup of Amtrak, all Penn Central intercity trains were taken over by Amtrak, but Penn Central continued to run commuter trains in several metropolitan areas, including the Valpo Local.

The bankrupt Penn Central merged into Conrail on April 1, 1976, which continued operations until 1979, at which point Amtrak took over. The route was also served by the daily Broadway Limited to New York City, and on October 1, 1981, the daily Capitol Limited to Washington, DC, began using it. At first the Valpo Local was served by two daily trains, the Calumet and the Indiana Connection; the Indiana Connection was discontinued first.

Due to Conrail's desire to abandon part of the former PRR main line, the Broadway Limited and Capitol Limited were rerouted respectively onto the former Baltimore and Ohio Railroad and New York Central Railroad lines on November 11, 1990, leaving about half of the Calumet route with no other service. Amtrak announced that it would discontinue the Calumet on December 31. Representative Peter J. Visclosky introduced a bill to require Amtrak to continue operations until July 1, 1991 to allow time for the State of Indiana to consider subsidizing the route. The date was changed to May 6 and the mandate was included in an amendment to the Independent Safety Board Act of 1974, signed into law November 28, 1990, by U.S. President George H. W. Bush. Indiana decided not to pay the required $1.5 million per year (equivalent to $3.46 million in 2024) and the weekday-only Calumet last ran Friday, May 3, 1991.

Commuter service from Chicago into northern Indiana is still provided by the South Shore Line, operated by the Northern Indiana Commuter Transportation District over its own alignment, whose closest stop, Dune Park station, is 15 miles (24 km) from Valparaiso, closer to Lake Michigan. The ChicaGo Dash express bus to Chicago, which operates during weekday rush hours, has for its Valparaiso terminal a parking lot adjacent the former rail station.

On August 1, 2004, the Chicago, Fort Wayne and Eastern Railroad started freight operations over the old route of the Calumet and beyond.

A study was conducted in 2017 to assess the return of service to Valparaiso, with the new service potentially running as far as Fort Wayne and northwest Ohio.

== Station stops ==
The Calumet and Indiana Connection were assigned numbers between 321 and 324, with odd numbers running westbound and even numbers eastbound. Trains made the following station stops (some of which closed prior to Amtrak's takeover of the route):

State	Municipality	Station	Notes
Illinois	Chicago	Chicago	
Illinois	Chicago	Englewood	Closed 1973–74
Illinois	Chicago	South Chicago	Closed 1950–55
Illinois	Chicago	State Line	Closed 1972–73
Indiana	Hammond	Hammond–Whiting	Opened 1982
Indiana	Whiting	Whiting	
Indiana	Whiting	Standard	Closed 1972–73
Indiana	East Chicago	Mahoning	Closed 1975
Indiana	East Chicago	Indiana Harbor	
Indiana	Gary	Buffington	Closed 1972–73
Indiana	Gary	Gary	Located at 5th Ave. and Chase St.
Indiana	Gary	Broadway	
Indiana	Hobart	Hobart	
Indiana	Wheeler	Wheeler	
Indiana	Valparaiso	Valparaiso	

== See also ==
- Michigan Executive, another discontinued Amtrak commuter rail line
