= Hammond–Whiting station =

Amtrak train station in Indiana

Hammond–Whiting, IN
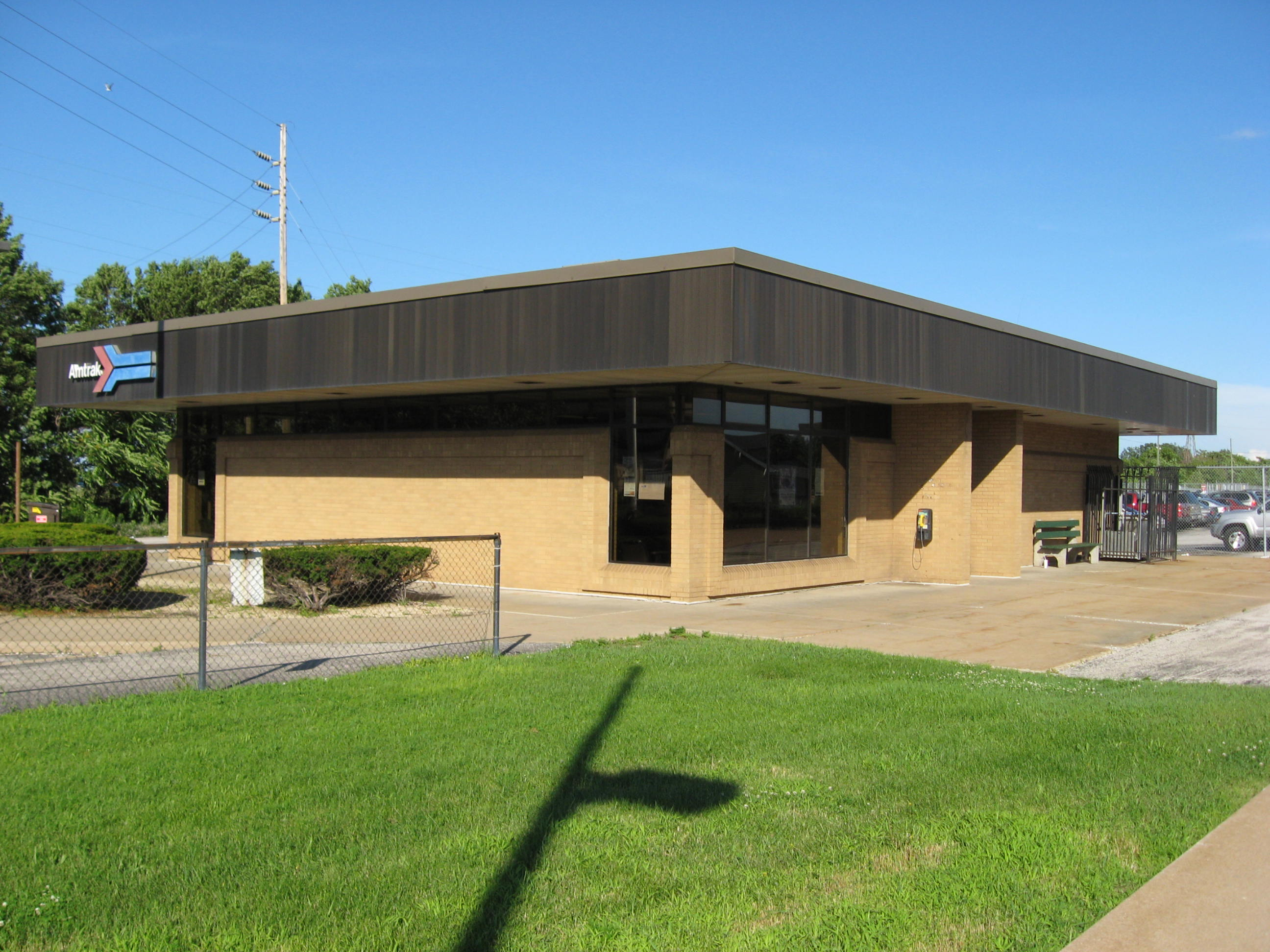
- Hammond–Whiting station building in 2010

General information
- Location: 1135 South Calumet Avenue; Hammond, Indiana; United States
- Coordinates: 41°41′28″N 87°30′24″W
- Owner: Amtrak
- Line: NS Chicago Line
- Platforms: 1
- Tracks: 4
- Connections: GPTC: R6

Construction
- Parking: 10 short term, 103 long term
- Accessible: Yes

Other information
- Station code: Amtrak: HMI

History
- Opened: September 12, 1982

Passengers
- FY 2025: 4,639 (Amtrak)

Services
| Preceding station | Amtrak | Following station |
|---|---|---|
| Chicago Terminus | Wolverine | New Buffalo toward Pontiac |
Blue Water does not stop here
Floridian does not stop here
Lake Shore Limited does not stop here
Pere Marquette does not stop here
Former services
| Preceding station | Amtrak | Following station |
|---|---|---|
| Chicago Terminus | Capitol Limited 1982–2001; 2003–2005 | South Bend toward Washington, D.C. |
| Chicago Terminus | Capitol Limited 1982–2001; 2003–2005 | Valparaiso (until 1990) toward Washington, D.C. |
| Chicago Terminus | Capitol Limited 1982–2001; 2003–2005 | Gary (until 1985) toward Washington, D.C. |
| Chicago Terminus | Three Rivers 1995–2005 | Nappanee toward New York |
| Chicago Terminus | Lake Shore Limited 1982–2003 | South Bend toward New York or Boston South |
| Chicago Terminus | Pennsylvanian 1998–2003 | South Bend toward New York |
| Chicago Terminus | International 1982–2001 | Niles toward Toronto |
| Chicago Terminus | Pere Marquette 1984–2001 | New Buffalo toward Grand Rapids |
| Chicago Terminus | Wolverine | Michigan City (until 2022) toward Pontiac |
| Chicago Terminus | Broadway Limited 1982–1995 | South Bend toward New York |
| Chicago Terminus | Broadway Limited 1982–1995 | Valparaiso (until 1990) toward New York |
| Chicago Terminus | Calumet 1982–1991 | Whiting toward Valparaiso |
| Chicago Terminus | Cardinal 1982–1986 | Gary (Miller & Lake) toward New York |
Track layout
Location

Hammond–Whiting station is an Amtrak intercity train station in Hammond, Indiana. The station is along the former Pennsylvania Railroad Fort Wayne Line, now owned by Norfolk Southern Railway. North of the station lies the former Baltimore and Ohio (now CSX) and Elgin, Joliet and Eastern Railroad (now Canadian National) tracks. The station building and parking lot lies on the former New York Central Railroad mainline. Hammond–Whiting opened on September 11, 1982. Until the early 2000s, it was served by all Amtrak service that ran east from Chicago; today, it is served only by the Wolverine. One Pontiac-bound train stops in the morning, while two Chicago-bound trains stop in the afternoon and at night, respectively.

== History ==
=== Opening ===
After the success of 1953-opened Route 128 station in the southern area of Greater Boston, railroads began to add suburban park-and-ride stops for intercity trains as complements to downtown stations. Penn Central opened Capital Beltway station in 1970 and Metropark station in 1971, providing suburban stops for Washington, D.C. and New York City. However, at the beginning of the 1980s, Chicago did not have such a stop for Amtrak intercity trains running to Michigan and the East Coast – most trains did not stop until Gary, South Bend, Valparaiso, or Niles. Only the Calumet and Indiana Connection commuter trains stopped in Whiting, Indiana, some 15 miles (24 km) southeast of Chicago.

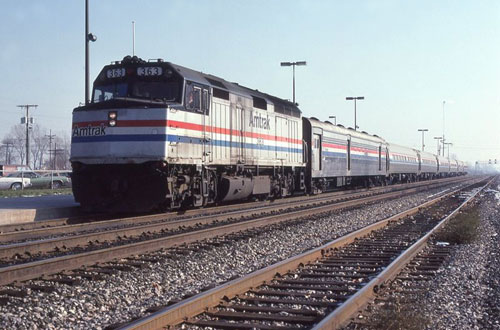
The westbound Wolverine at Hammond–Whiting in November 1984

Indiana Representative Adam Benjamin Jr., chairman of the House Appropriations Subcommittee on Transportation, induced Amtrak to add a suburban station southeast of Chicago. Located in Whiting (at a location that had not previously had a railroad station) but co-named for larger Hammond, Indiana, Hammond–Whiting station opened on September 12, 1982. It was initially served by ten daily round trips: the Calumet and Indiana Connection commuter trains; the International Limited, Lake Cities, Twilight Limited, and Wolverine services to Michigan; and the Broadway Limited, Capitol Limited, Cardinal, and Lake Shore Limited long-distance trains.

For the next two decades, the station was served by all Amtrak service on the line. The Pere Marquette began on August 5, 1984; the Cardinal was rerouted to the southwest on April 27, 1986. The Indiana Connection was discontinued on January 10, 1986, followed by the Calumet on May 6, 1991. The Broadway Limited was replaced by the Three Rivers on September 10, 1995. The Pennsylvanian was extended to Chicago with a stop at Hammond–Whiting on November 7, 1998.

=== Service reductions ===
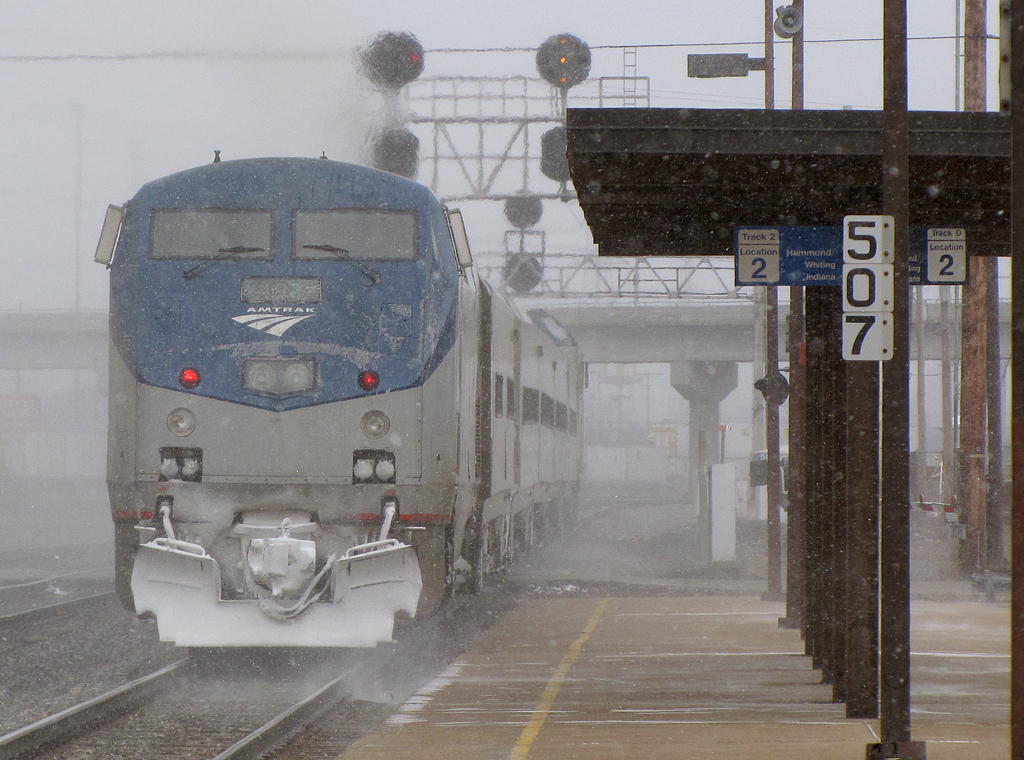
A Wolverine passing through the station in 2008

The station was built cheaply, using a standard Amtrak design. The single side platform serves only one of the line's three tracks; this caused operational difficulties with routing numerous daily Amtrak trains onto that single track. Amtrak began reducing service to the station in the early 2000s because of low ridership and Norfolk Southern's requests due to the operational issues. On October 29, 2000, the Wolverine stop at Hammond–Whiting was discontinued. The Pere Marquette and International ceased stopping on April 29, 2001, followed by the Capitol Limited on July 9.

The Pennsylvanian was cut back to Pittsburgh on February 10, 2003. The Lake Shore Limited stop was discontinued on April 28, 2003, as the train averaged just five passengers per train at Hammond–Whiting, but the Capitol Limited stop was re-added. The Three Rivers was cut on March 7, 2005. The station lost its ticket agent on April 25, 2005, when the Capitol Limited again ceased to stop. This left only two daily Wolverine round trips (the former Lake Cities and Twilight Limited, renamed on April 26, 2004) as the only service at Hammond–Whiting. In 2011, Amtrak considered stopping the Lake Shore Limited at the station; however, it was rejected due to operational difficulties and low projected ridership.

== See also ==
- Hammond Gateway station
