= Valparaiso station =

Former train station in Indiana, United States

Valparaiso, IN
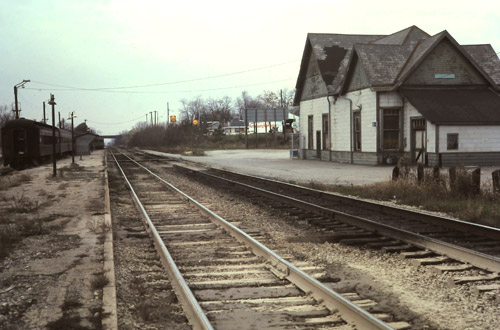
- The old station building, November 1977

General information
- Location: 453 West Lincolnway; Valparaiso, Indiana
- Coordinates: 41°28′01.6″N 87°03′59.8″W
- Line: Pittsburgh, Fort Wayne and Chicago Railway
- Platforms: side platform

History
- Opened: April 25, 1976 (Amtrak)
- Closed: May 3, 1991 (Amtrak)
- Rebuilt: c. 1980s

Former services
Preceding station	Amtrak	Following station
Wheeler toward Chicago	Calumet	Terminus
Hammond–Whiting toward Chicago	Broadway Limited (1976–1990)	Warsaw toward New York
Gary (until 1979) toward Chicago	Broadway Limited (1976–1990)	Warsaw toward New York
Hammond–Whiting toward Chicago	Capitol Limited (1981–1990)	Warsaw toward Washington, D.C.
Gary (until 1985) toward Chicago	Capitol Limited (1981–1990)	Warsaw toward Washington, D.C.
Preceding station	Pennsylvania Railroad	Following station
Wheeler toward Chicago	Main Line	Wanatah toward New York or Exchange Place
Loucks toward Chicago	Valparaiso Local	Terminus
Location

Valparaiso station was a train station in Valparaiso, Indiana. Initially served by the Pennsylvania Railroad, it was the outbound terminus of the Amtrak Calumet until that service's discontinuance in 1991.

Amtrak began service here on April 25, 1976, as a stop of the Capitol Limited. A fire destroyed the original station building and a small shelter replaced it.

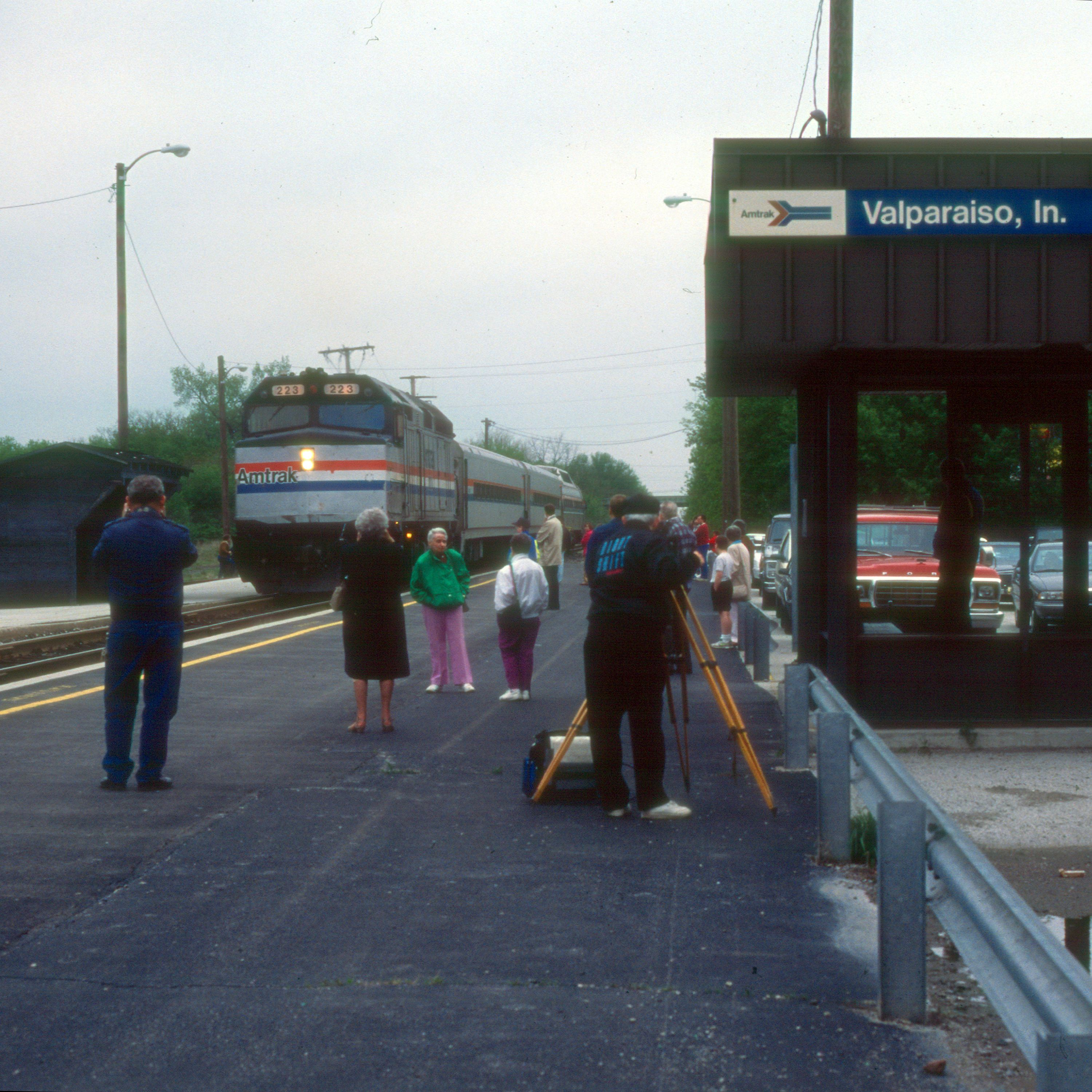
One of the final Calumet runs at Valparaiso station, May 1991
