= Chicago Union Station =

Railroad station in Chicago, Illinois

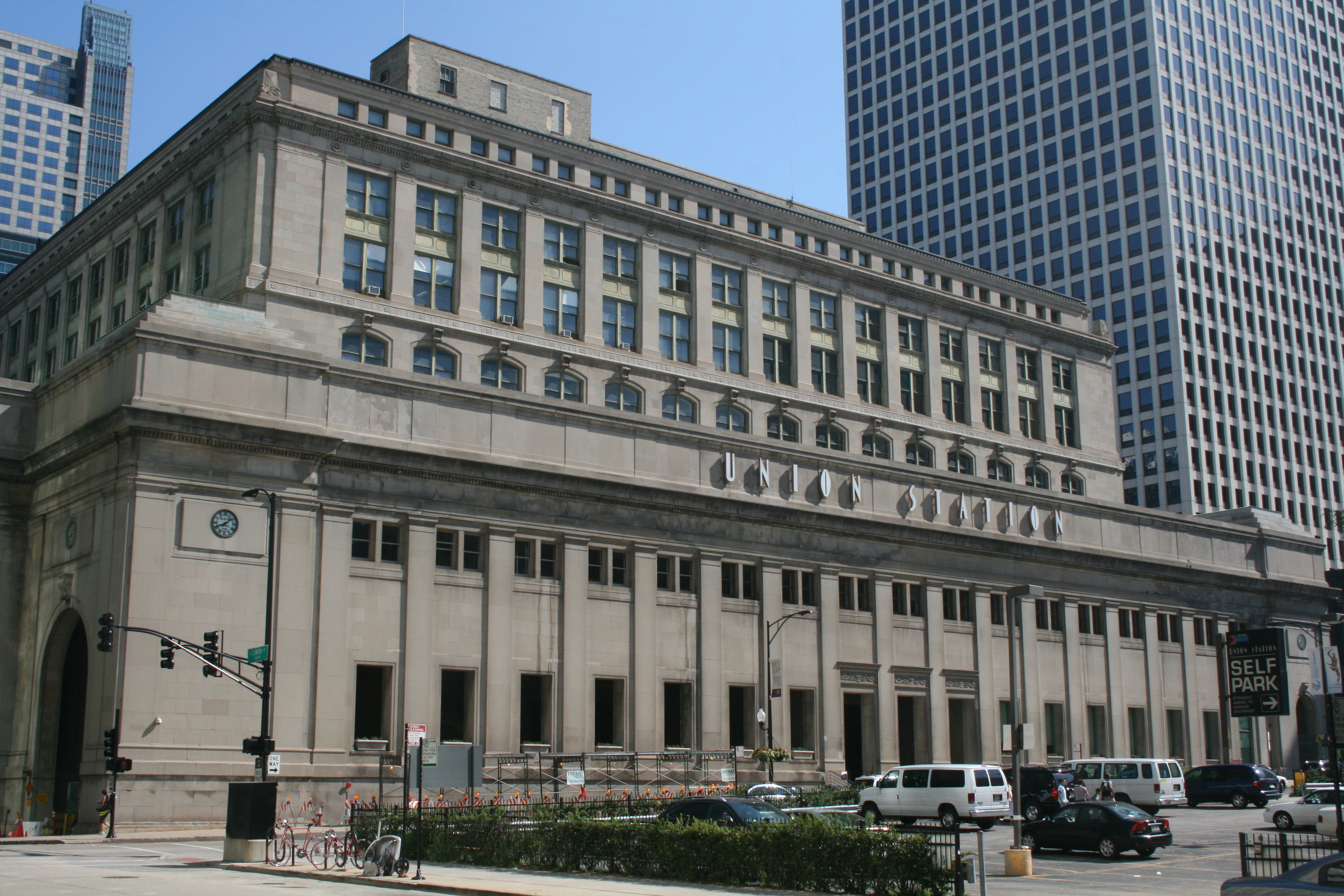
- South facade of the head house

General information
- Location: 225 South Canal Street, Chicago, Illinois
- Owner: Amtrak
- Operator: Amtrak, Metra
- Lines: C&M Subdivision (North Concourse); Chicago Subdivision (South Concourse)
- Platforms: 30 island platforms
- Tracks: 24 (14 South Concourse, 10 North Concourse)
- Connections: Chicago "L": Blue at Clinton; Brown Orange Pink Purple at Quincy; CTA Buses, Amtrak Thruway, Pace, Megabus, Greyhound

Construction
- Parking: Paid
- Cycle facilities: 3 Divvy bikeshare stations
- Accessible: Yes

Other information
- Station code: Amtrak: CHI
- IATA code: ZUN
- Fare zone: 1 (Metra)
- Website: chicagounionstation.com

History
- Opened: 1881 (original station); May 16, 1925; 101 years ago (current station)

Passengers
- FY 2025: 3,175,856 (Amtrak)
Services
Preceding station	Amtrak	Following station
Terminus	Blue Water	New Buffalo toward Port Huron
Terminus	Cardinal	Dyer toward New York
Terminus	Floridian	South Bend toward Miami
Terminus	Lake Shore Limited	South Bend toward New York or Boston South
Terminus	Pere Marquette	St. Joseph toward Grand Rapids
Terminus	Wolverine	Hammond–Whiting toward Pontiac
Glenview toward St. Paul	Borealis	Terminus
Naperville toward Emeryville	California Zephyr	Terminus
Homewood toward New Orleans	City of New Orleans	Terminus
Glenview toward Seattle or Portland	Empire Builder	Terminus
Glenview toward Milwaukee	Hiawatha	Terminus
Homewood toward Carbondale	Illini and Saluki	Terminus
La Grange toward Quincy	Illinois Zephyr and Carl Sandburg	Terminus
Summit toward St. Louis	Lincoln Service	Terminus
Naperville toward Los Angeles	Southwest Chief	Terminus
Joliet toward Los Angeles or San Antonio	Texas Eagle	Terminus
Preceding station	Metra	Following station
Halsted Street toward Aurora	BNSF	Terminus
Summit toward Joliet	Heritage Corridor Weekday rush hours	Terminus
Western Avenue toward Fox Lake	Milwaukee District North	Terminus
Western Avenue toward Big Timber/Elgin	Milwaukee District West	Terminus
Western Avenue toward Antioch	North Central Service Weekdays	Terminus
Wrightwood toward Manhattan	SouthWest Service Weekdays	Terminus
Former services
Preceding station	Amtrak	Following station
Terminus	Capitol Limited 1981–2024	South Bend toward Washington, D.C.
Terminus	Cardinal	Gary 1982–1986 toward New York
Terminus	Hoosier State 1980–2019	Dyer toward Indianapolis
Terminus	Kentucky Cardinal 1999–2003	Dyer toward Louisville
Terminus	Pennsylvanian 1998–2003	Hammond–Whiting toward Philadelphia
Terminus	Three Rivers 1995–2005	Hammond–Whiting toward New York
Terminus	International	Hammond–Whiting 1982–2001 toward Toronto
Terminus	International	Niles 2001–2004 toward Toronto
Terminus	Lake Cities 1980–2004	Hammond–Whiting toward Pontiac
Terminus	Twilight Limited 1976–2004	Hammond–Whiting toward Pontiac
Terminus	Broadway Limited Discontinued in 1995	Hammond–Whiting toward New York
Terminus	Lake Shore 1971–1972	South Bend toward New York (Grand Central)
Terminus	Calumet Discontinued in 1991	Hammond–Whiting toward Valparaiso
Terminus	Mountaineer 1975–1977	Peru toward Norfolk
Terminus	James Whitcomb Riley 1974–1977	Peru toward Washington, D.C.
Terminus	James Whitcomb Riley and George Washington 1972–1974	Homewood toward Washington, D.C. or Newport News
Terminus	Floridian	Logansport 1972–1975 toward St. Petersburg or Miami
Terminus	Floridian	Lafayette 1975–1979 toward St. Petersburg or Miami
Elmhurst 1974-1981 toward Dubuque	Black Hawk 1974–1981	Terminus
Glenview toward Janesville	Lake Country Limited 2000-2001	Terminus
Joliet (Union Station) toward Dallas or Houston	Lone Star 1974–1979	Terminus
Joliet (Union Station) toward Laredo or Houston	Inter-American 1973–1981	Terminus
Naperville toward Los Angeles	Desert Wind 1979–1997	Terminus
Naperville toward Seattle	Pioneer 1977–1997	Terminus
Glenview toward Seattle	North Coast Hiawatha 1971–1979	Terminus
Preceding station	Burlington Route	Following station
La Grange toward Denver	Main Line	Terminus
Aurora toward Oakland	California Zephyr	Terminus
La Grange toward Minneapolis	Minneapolis – Chicago	Terminus
Halsted Street toward Aurora	Suburban Service	Terminus
Preceding station	Milwaukee Road	Following station
Western Avenue toward Seattle or Tacoma	Main Line	Terminus
Western Avenue toward Omaha	Omaha – Chicago	Terminus
Western Avenue toward Milwaukee	Chicago – Milwaukee	Terminus
Western Avenue toward Walworth	Suburban Service North Line	Terminus
Western Avenue toward Elgin	Suburban Service West Line	Terminus
Fullerton Avenue toward Llewellyn Park	Chicago – Evanston	Terminus
Preceding station	Pennsylvania Railroad	Following station
Terminus	Main Line	Englewood toward New York or Exchange Place
Terminus	Valparaiso Local	Garfield Boulevard toward Valparaiso
Terminus	Chicago – Columbus	Englewood toward Columbus
Terminus	Chicago – Cincinnati	Englewood toward Cincinnati
Terminus	Chicago – Louisville	Englewood toward Louisville
Preceding station	Alton Railroad	Following station
Halsted Street toward St. Louis	Main Line	Terminus
Preceding station	Norfolk and Western Railway	Following station
47th Street toward Orland Park	Orland Park Cannonball	Terminus
Future services
Preceding station	Amtrak	Following station
LaGrange Road toward Moline	Quad Cities Proposed	Terminus
Preceding station	Metra	Following station
Elgin toward Rockford	Rockford Intercity Passenger Rail	Terminus
- 41°52′43″N 87°38′25″W

Site notes
- Architect(s): D. H. Burnham & Company and successors
- Architectural style: Beaux-Arts

Chicago Landmark
- Designated: May 1, 2002
Track layout
Key
Location

Chicago Union Station is an intercity and commuter rail terminal located in the West Loop neighborhood of the Near West Side of Chicago, United States. Amtrak's flagship station in the Midwest, Union Station is the terminus of eight national long-distance routes and eight regional corridor routes. Six Metra commuter lines also terminate here.

Union Station is just west of the Chicago River between West Adams Street and West Jackson Boulevard, adjacent to the Chicago Loop. Including approach and storage tracks, it covers about nine and a half city blocks (mostly underground, beneath streets and skyscrapers, some built with the earliest usage of railway air rights).

The present station opened in 1925, replacing an earlier union station on this site built in 1881. The station is the fourth-busiest rail station in the United States, after Pennsylvania Station, Grand Central Terminal, and Jamaica station in New York City, and the busiest outside of the Northeast Corridor. It handles about 140,000 passengers on an average weekday (including 10,000 Amtrak passengers). It has Bedford limestone Beaux-Arts facades, and an interior with massive Corinthian columns, marble floors, and a Great Hall, highlighted by brass lamps.

The station connects to multiple transit authorities including the Chicago Transit Authority (CTA) bus and Chicago "L" rapid transit lines, Metra trains at other nearby downtown terminals, Pace buses, Greyhound, and more either within the station or within walking distance.

== Name ==
Chicago Union Station is named a union station, like many train stations across the United States that were shared by several railroad companies. The station is the third union station to occupy the site between West Adams Street and West Jackson Boulevard. The station is known by the acronym CUS, as well as by its Amtrak station code CHI.

== Location ==
Chicago Union Station is situated in the West Loop Gate neighborhood of the Near West Side of Chicago, just west of Chicago's Loop. The station's underground concourse and train sheds abut the Chicago River; passageways extend west beneath Canal Street to the main station building, one block over.

== Services ==
Union Station serves as a terminal for all Amtrak trains to Chicago (orange), as well as several Metra lines (green). Thin black lines represent former Amtrak routings.

=== Amtrak ===
- Blue Water (Chicago – Port Huron, Michigan)
- Borealis (Chicago – St. Paul)
- California Zephyr (Chicago – Emeryville)
- Cardinal (Chicago – New York)
- City of New Orleans (Chicago – New Orleans)
- Empire Builder (Chicago – Portland/Seattle)
- Floridian (Chicago – Miami)
- Hiawatha (Chicago – Milwaukee)
- Illini and Saluki (Chicago – Carbondale, Illinois)
- Illinois Zephyr and Carl Sandburg (Chicago – Quincy)
- Lake Shore Limited (Chicago – New York/Boston)
- Lincoln Service (Chicago – St. Louis)
- Pere Marquette (Chicago – Grand Rapids)
- Southwest Chief (Chicago – Los Angeles)
- Texas Eagle (Chicago – San Antonio/Los Angeles)
- Wolverine (Chicago – Pontiac)

=== Metra ===
==== North Concourse (odd tracks) ====
- to Fox Lake, IL
- to Antioch, IL
- to Elgin, IL - Big Timber Road

==== South Concourse (even tracks) ====
- to Aurora, IL
- to Joliet, IL
- to Manhattan, IL

=== Connections ===
==== Ogilvie Transportation Center ====
Union Station is located adjacent to Ogilvie Transportation Center, one of Metra's other downtown Chicago terminals. Ogilvie is located in front of Union Station's Madison Street Entrance, which can be accessed through the platforms in the North Concourse.

Metra's other two downtown terminals – LaSalle Street Station and Millennium Station – are in the Loop proper past the Chicago River and can be accessed by walking or taking a CTA bus.

==== CTA - Chicago "L" Rapid Transit ====
Unlike many major American intercity and commuter rail hubs, Union Station does not have any direct connection to local rapid transit service. However, two Chicago "L" stations are within walking distance of Union Station.

- Clinton (two blocks south of the station): Blue
- Quincy (three blocks east of the station, on The Loop): Brown, Orange, Pink, and Purple

==== CTA and Pace - Local Bus service ====
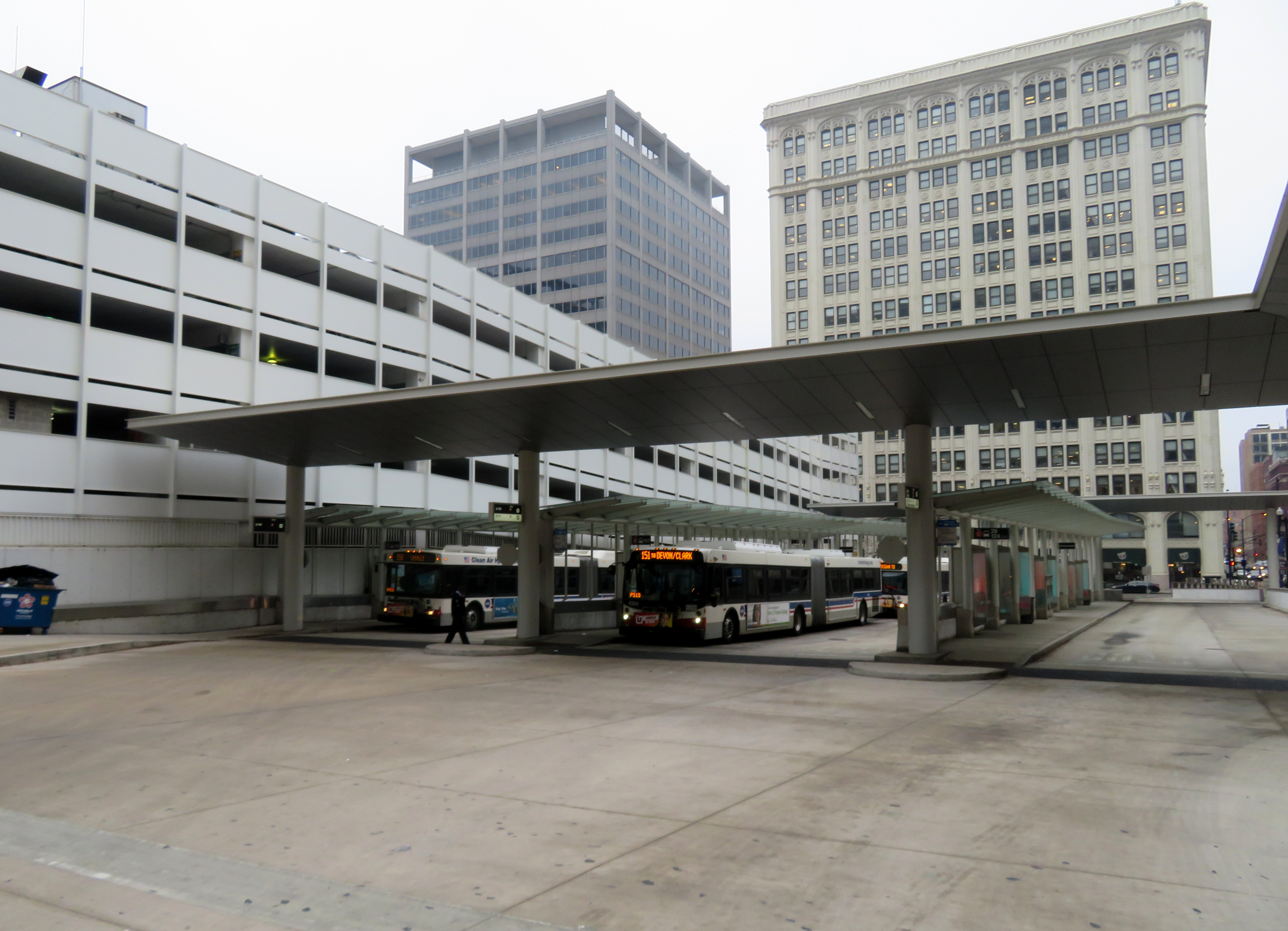
Union Station Transit Center and station garage

Numerous CTA bus routes stop directly at Union Station:

- Union Station Transit Center: 1 28 121 124 128 151 156
- West side of Clinton, north side of block: 125 130 192
- West side of Clinton, south side of block: 7 60 157
- Southwest corner of Clinton/Jackson: 126 755 (Pace)
- Madison Street entrance: J14 19 56 120

Union Station Transit Center is located adjacent to Union Station's parking garage. The bus station opened in 2016, on land formerly used for a surface parking lot. It features an elevator and stairway to the Amtrak underground pedestrian tunnel, allowing commuters to pass between Union Station and the bus staging area without crossing at street level.

==== Inter-City Buses ====
Union Station has a counter operated by the Greyhound intercity bus company. Tickets are available for purchase, and some Greyhound and Megabus buses pick up passengers on South Canal Street, on the east side of the station building. The full-service Greyhound station is four blocks southwest of Union Station.

=== Historical services ===
Map of historical routes and services

Union Station was served by lines in all directions even before Penn Central and Amtrak consolidated the downtown terminals. The station served as a terminal for the following railroads:

- Chicago and Alton Railroad – only a tenant, later part of the Gulf, Mobile and Ohio Railroad
- Chicago, Burlington and Quincy Railroad (Burlington Route)
- Chicago, Milwaukee, St. Paul and Pacific Railroad (Milwaukee Road) – The station housed its corporate offices from 1924 to 1986
- Pittsburgh, Fort Wayne and Chicago Railway (PRR)
- Pittsburgh, Cincinnati, Chicago and St. Louis Railroad (Panhandle) (moved to use the PFW&C approach after April 23, 1917)
- Penn Central Transportation Company (former services of the New York Central Railroad and Michigan Central Railroad) (moved from LaSalle Street Station October 27, 1968)
- Amtrak (began May 1, 1971, moved from Dearborn Station May 2, 1971 and Central Station March 6, 1972 (Floridian moved January 23, 1972); Amtrak's Calumet and Indiana Connection commuter trains also ran into Union Station)

Burlington Route	Gulf, Mobile and Ohio	Milwaukee Road		Pennsylvania		Great Northern	Northern Pacific
California Zephyr; Denver Zephyr; Twin Cities Zephyrs; American Royal Zephyr; Kansas City Zephyr; Western Star	Alton Limited; Abraham Lincoln; Ann Rutledge; Midnight Special	Twin Cities Hiawatha; Midwest Hiawatha; Pioneer Limited; Olympian; Columbian; Olympian Hiawatha	City of San Francisco; City of Los Angeles; City of Portland; Challenger; Sioux; The Arrow	The Admiral; Broadway Limited; The General; Trail Blazer; Cincinnati Daylight Express	The Fort Pitt; Pennsylvania Limited; Pennsylvanian; Manhattan Limited; South Wind; Gotham Limited	Empire Builder; Western Star	North Coast Limited; Mainstreeter

Some of these trains and their names have survived to present Amtrak services, such as the Empire Builder, the California Zephyr, and the Hiawatha.

The name Ann Rutledge was used by Amtrak as a Chicago-St. Louis-Kansas City route until a name and service consolidation in 2009. There is also a Lincoln Service that operates in Illinois.

=== Future Services ===
The Illinois Department of Transportation (IDOT) has funded and programmed two new passenger rail services that will originate at Union Station. One service will be operated by Amtrak and the other service will be operated by Metra.

==== Amtrak future services ====
- Quad Cities (Chicago – Moline, IL)

==== Metra future services ====
- Rockford Intercity Passenger Rail (Chicago – Rockford, IL)

== Interior ==
=== Great Hall ===
The Great Hall

The Great Hall is a 110-foot (34 m)-high atrium capped by a large barrel-vaulted skylight. The 24,000-square-foot (2,200 m^{2}) room has connecting lobbies, staircases, and balconies. Enormous wooden benches are arranged in the room for travelers to wait for connections, and two specially designed underground taxicab drives were built to protect travelers from the weather. The room's columns are of textured Roman travertine, with leafy golden Corinthian capitals. The ceilings and insets are coffered, with decorative rosettes.

=== Station building ===
Walkway between the Great Hall and concourse level

Located west of Canal Street, Union Station's station building occupies an entire city block and houses the Great Hall. Arrayed around the Great Hall are numerous smaller spaces containing restaurants and services, and a wide passageway leading to the concourse. Above the main floor are several floors of office space, currently used by Amtrak. Original plans called for many more floors of offices, forming a skyscraper above the Great Hall. This was never completed, although the plan has been revived in recent years. The Burlington Room is an event space at the northwest of the Great Hall. The room features large columns, chandeliers, four French block murals of landscape scenery, and an original mirror. The space, initially a women's lounge, was restored in November 2016, after years of damage and neglect. For event uses, the space has color-changing lights and an audiovisual system.

The headhouse includes a space formerly used as a Fred Harvey restaurant. After a large fire in 1980, the space was damaged, windows on Clinton Street were destroyed, and the space was left vacant since then. In 2018, Amtrak announced plans to redevelop the space into a multi-level food hall, using funds from the sale of its parking garage. A new entrance and canopy would be installed on Clinton Street, and new windows would replace the bricked-up windows. The food hall was planned to open in the summer of 2020.

Entrance to the Metropolitan Lounge

The headhouse also includes a Metropolitan Lounge, one of seven Amtrak offers in its stations. The lounge operates like an airport lounge, accessible to business- and first-class passengers, as well as other high-price ticketed passengers. The lounge reopened in June 2016, moving from the concourse to the headhouse. It has two stories and 13,500 square feet (1,250 m^{2}), double the space of the previous lounge. It features different seating areas intended for businesspeople, families and children, and people using phones or tablets. The space has bathrooms with showers, and an elevator.

=== Platforms and tracks ===
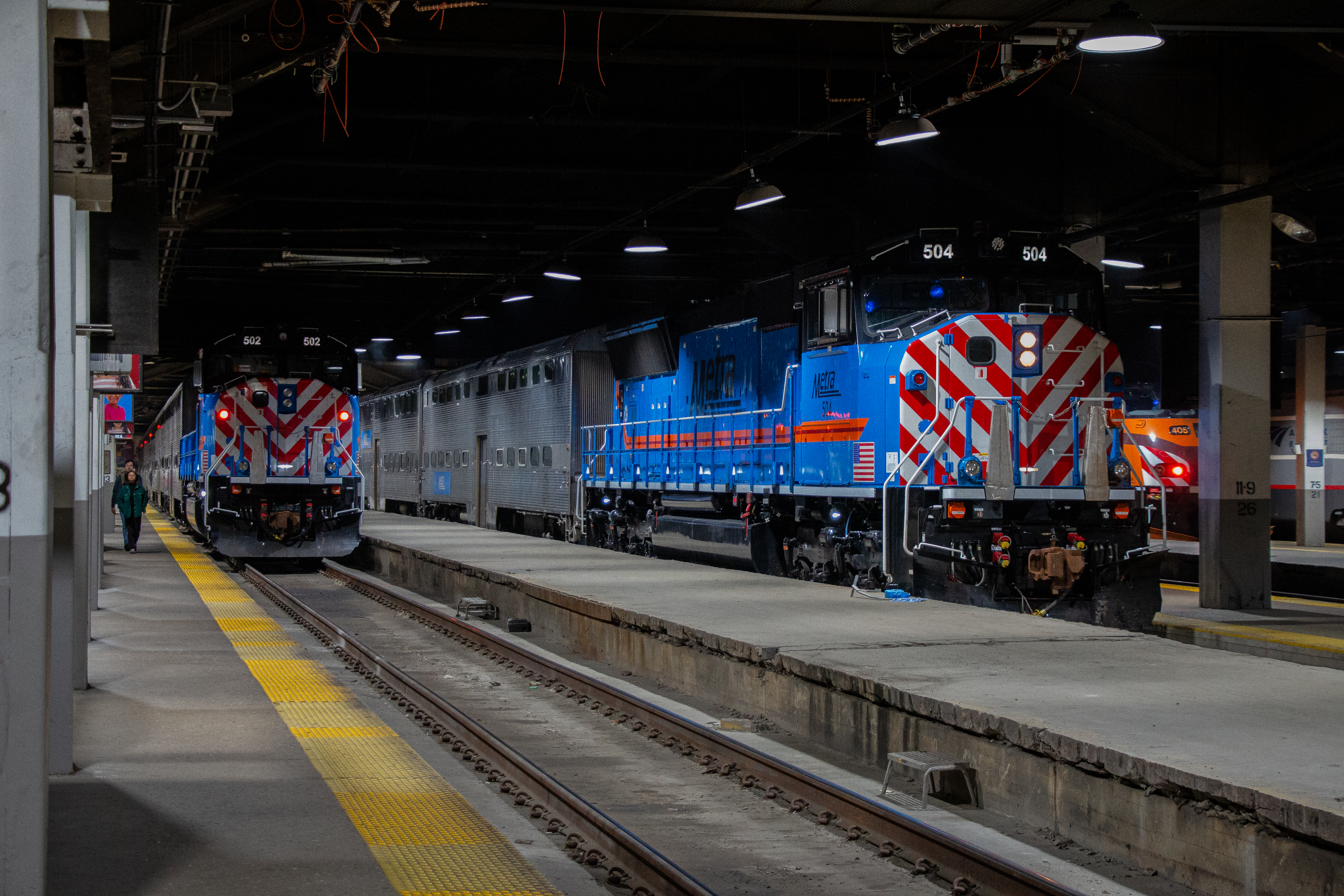
Metra trains in the North Concourse (odd tracks)

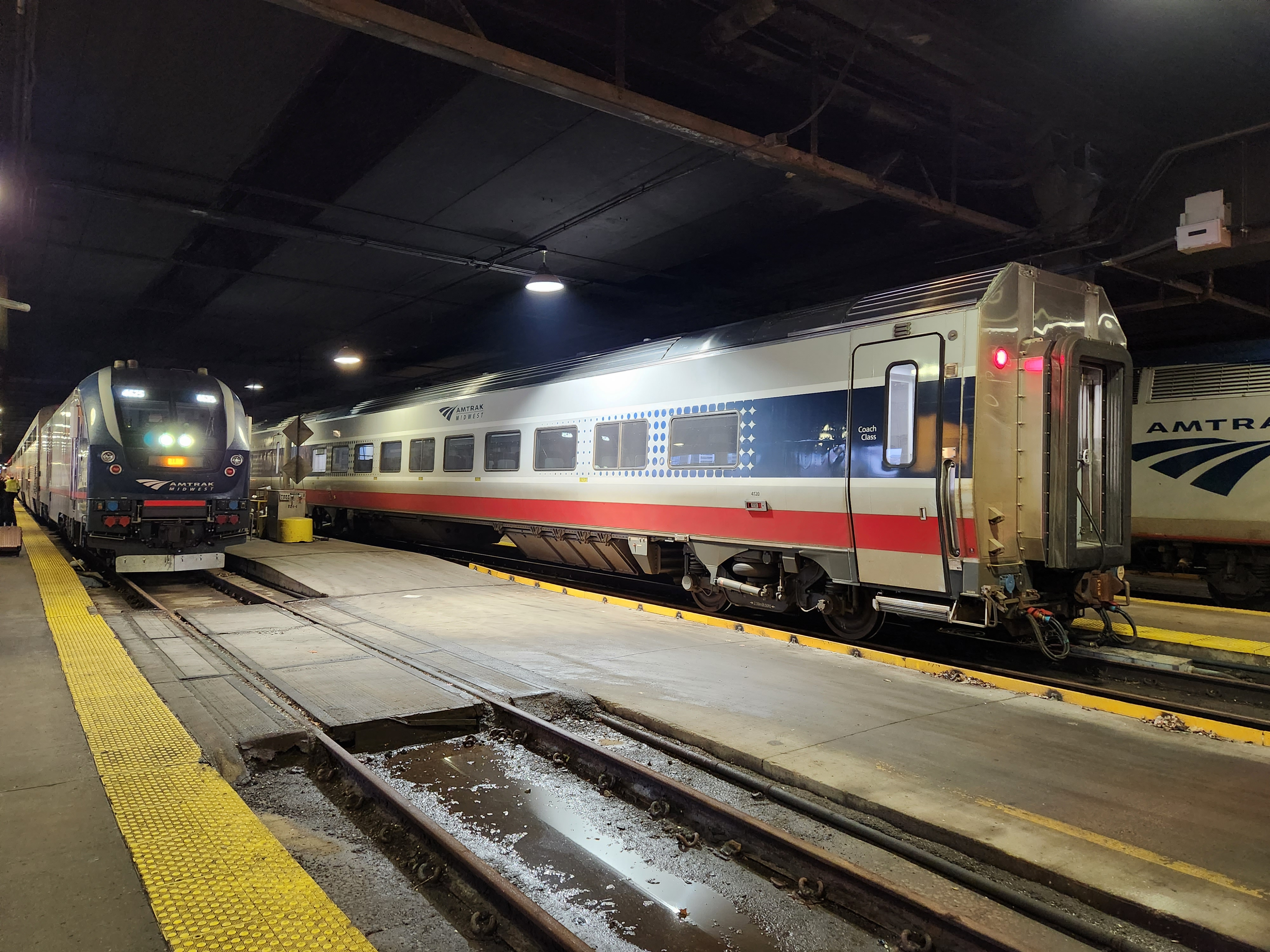
Amtrak trains in the South Concourse (even tracks)

Union Station is laid out with a double stub-end configuration, with 10 tracks coming into the station from the north and 14 from the south. Unlike most of Amtrak's major stations, every train calling at Union Station either originates or terminates there; all passengers traveling through Chicago must change trains to reach their final destination. There are two through tracks to allow out-of-service equipment moves between the north and south side, including one with a platform to allow extra long trains or northern-bound trains to board on the south platforms. Between the north and south sides of the station is a passenger concourse. Passengers can walk through the concourse to get from any platform to any other without stairs or elevators.

Odd-numbered platforms (1–19) are on the north half of the station, and even-numbered platforms (2–30) on the south half. The north tracks are used by Amtrak for the Hiawatha, the Borealis, and the Empire Builder, and by Metra for the Milwaukee District West, Milwaukee District North, and North Central Service routes. The south tracks are used for all other Amtrak services, as well as by Metra for the BNSF, SouthWest Service, and Heritage Corridor lines.

Two station management structures (known as glasshouses), one on each side of the terminal, monitor train-to-track assignments and the flow of traffic in and out of the station. Actual oversight and control of switching and signalling is accomplished by two "train director" positions, one for each side of the station, located in the Amtrak control center in the station's headhouse.

Numerous entrances provide access to Union Station's underground platform level. The main entrance is on Canal Street opposite the headhouse, but passengers can also reach the platforms directly from the headhouse via an underground passageway. Two secondary entrances are located in Riverside Plaza near the Jackson Boulevard and Adams Street bridges. The Union Station Transit Center bus terminal across Jackson Boulevard has a stairway and elevator leading to the south concourse. On Madison Street, across the street, and one block east from Ogilvie Transportation Center, are a set of entrances to the north platforms.

== Architecture ==
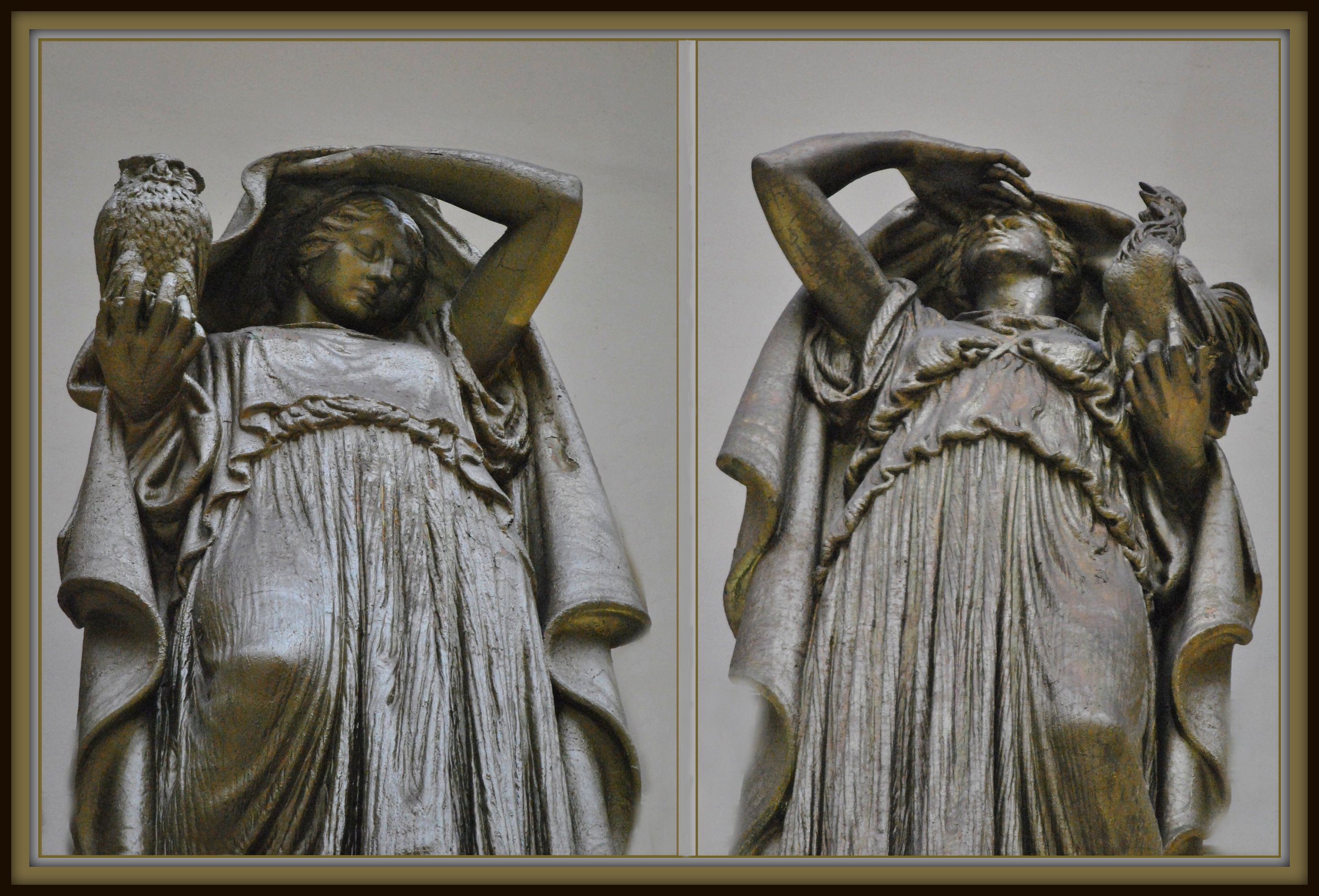
Night and Day by Henry Hering

Union Station was designed by D. H. Burnham & Company (known for its lead architect Daniel Burnham, who died before construction began). The successor firm of Graham, Anderson, Probst and White completed the work. The terminal was among the first to anticipate automobile traffic; it was first designed in 1909, one year after the Model T entered production. It was designed with ticket offices, concourses, platforms, waiting and baggage rooms, and shops, all on a single level, meant to be easy to navigate. At opening, the terminal also housed a hospital, chapel, and jail cell.

The main building, a square Neoclassical structure, takes up one city block. Its architectural style contrasts with modern glass-faced buildings around it. The station has wide porticos and large colonnades on its exterior. The street-level entrances utilize Indiana limestone.

The station originally featured a large Beaux-Arts concourse building along the river, made with marble, glass, and iron. Massive steel arches held up the vaulted roof, and several stairways led passengers down to the platforms. The concourse was demolished in 1969 and replaced with an office tower.

Two statues by Henry Hering – Night and Day – look down on passengers, symbolizing the 24-hour operation of the railroads. The statue Night holds an owl, while Day holds a rooster.

== Related structures ==
=== Power station ===
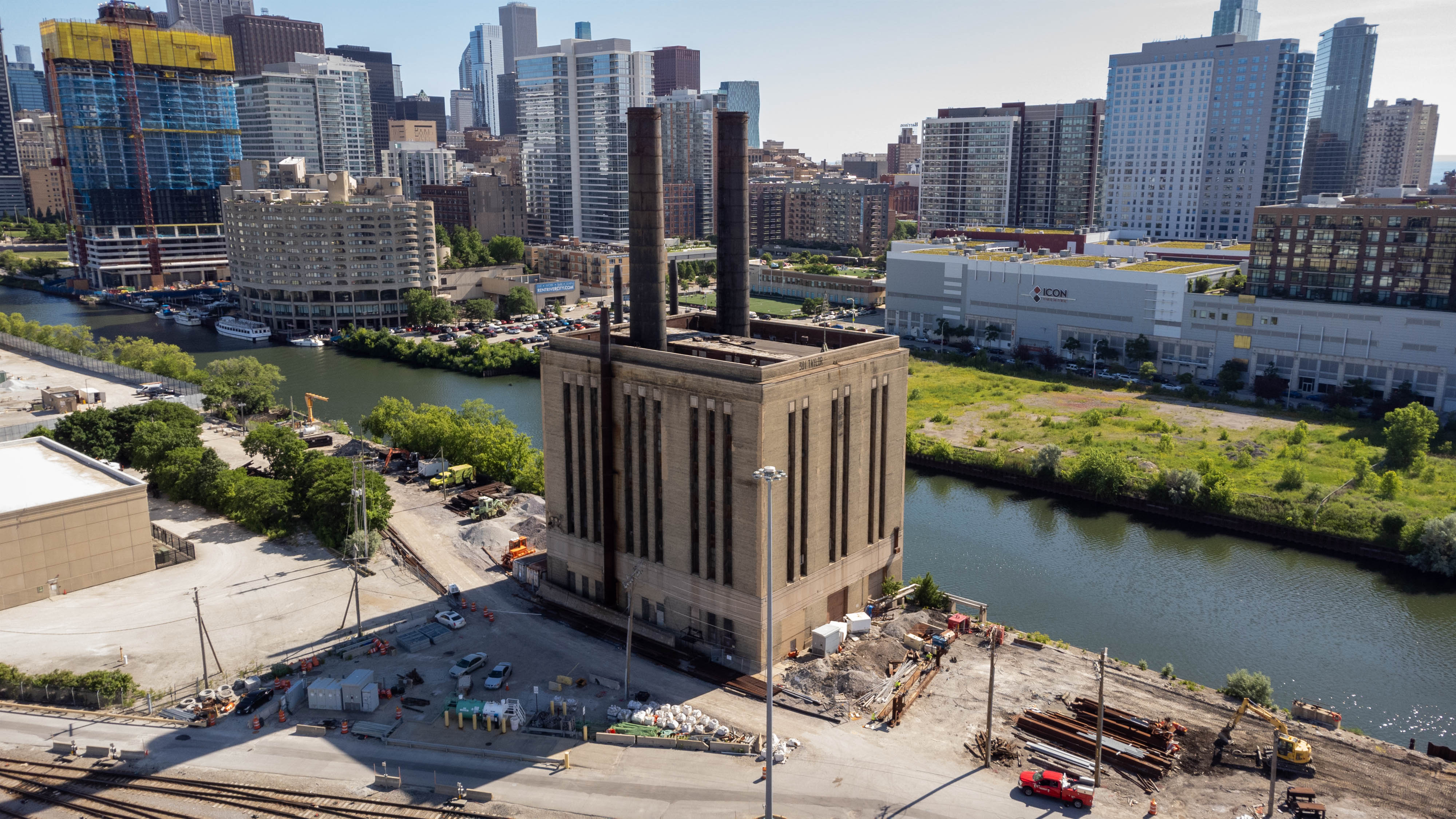
Chicago Union Station Power House

The Chicago Union Station Power House is a decommissioned coal-fire power plant that provided power to Union Station and its surrounding infrastructure. Located on the Chicago River, north of Roosevelt Road, it was designed in the Art Moderne style by Graham, Anderson, Probst and White in 1931. The power plant was decommissioned in 2011. It was included in Preservation Chicago's 7 Most Endangered list in 2017 and 2020, as Amtrak has plans to demolish the building.

=== Post office ===
The same architecture firm that designed Union Station also designed the Old Chicago Main Post Office, a post office atop the station's southern tracks. The post office, opened four years before Union Station, utilized the rail system, funneling mail to and from the trains below. An expansion in 1932 made the structure the world's largest post office.

=== Construction over the station's train shed ===
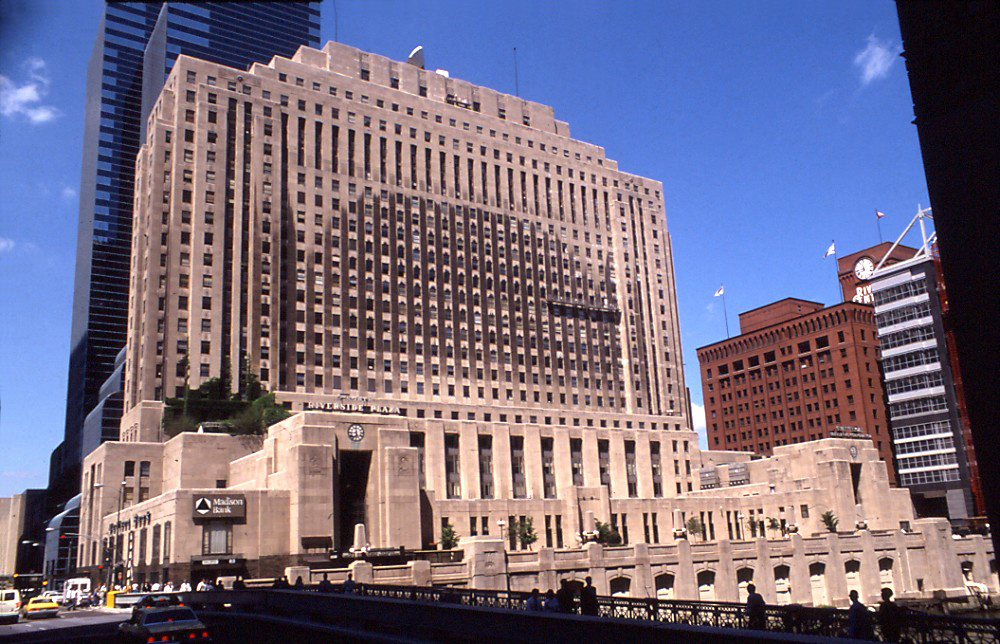
Chicago Daily News Building

The large amount of land above the tracks and platforms has tempted property owners and developers. Possibly inspired by Terminal City, a development built atop New York's Grand Central Terminal's train shed, Chicago moved to develop the air rights above Union Station's tracks. The first building to be built was that of the Chicago Daily News in 1929. Designed in the Art Deco style, it was the first structure to add a public promenade along the river, which would be named Riverside Plaza. Soon after, in 1932, the new Chicago Main Post Office opened. Also in the Art Deco style, it is a gigantic structure that occupies two full city blocks. The Great Depression and subsequent World War II halted development, but in the 1960s, work began on Gateway Center, a Modernist complex of five buildings. Only the first four were built, and construction lasted into the 1980s through several economic cycles.

In 1990 the Morton International Building opened. Now named for Boeing, it was the tallest building constructed over the tracks. With the construction of River Point beginning in 2013 and 150 North Riverside beginning in 2014, the entire length of the train shed and tracks from Union Station north to Fulton Street and south to Polk Street is enclosed by overhead development.

Chicago Union Station's train shed, covered by buildings built above the tracks, helped lead locomotives to funnel significant soot and smoke in and around the station. This was unlike Grand Central Terminal, which has only allowed electric trains into its trainshed since opening.

== History ==
The current Union Station is the second by that name built in Chicago, and possibly the third rail station to occupy the site. The need for a single, centralized station was an important political topic in 19th and 20th-century Chicago, as various competing railroads had built a series of terminal stations. The numerous stations and associated railyards and tracks surrounded the city's central business district, the Loop, and threatened its expansion. The various stations also made travel difficult for through-travelers, many of whom had to make inconvenient transfers often slowed by street traffic from one station to another through the Loop. Union Station was part of architect Daniel Burnham's city-wide Plan of Chicago in 1909.

=== Predecessors ===
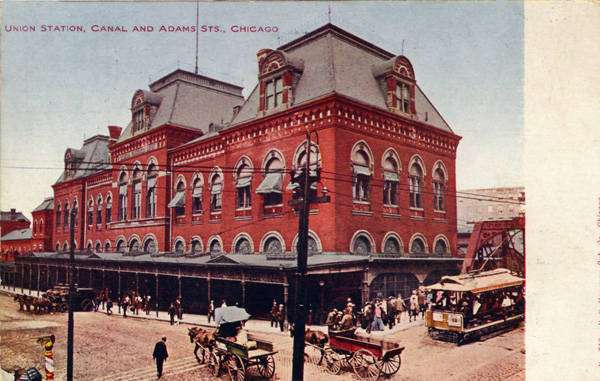
Union Depot, the first union station in Chicago

On December 25, 1858, the Pittsburgh, Fort Wayne and Chicago Railroad opened as far as Van Buren Street in Chicago. It built the first station at what would eventually become today's Union Station on the west bank of the Chicago River.

The railroad built a permanent depot at the corner of Canal and Madison streets in 1861.

On April 7, 1874, five railroads agreed to build and share a union station just north of the original Pittsburgh, Fort Wayne, and Chicago Railroad station site at Van Buren Street. These railroads were:

- Pennsylvania Company (a subsidiary of the Pennsylvania Railroad)
- Chicago, Burlington and Quincy Railroad (Burlington Route)
- Michigan Central Railroad
- Chicago and Alton Railroad
- Chicago, Milwaukee and St. Paul Railway (The Milwaukee Road)

The Michigan Central, which had previously been using the Illinois Central Railroad's Great Central Station, soon decided to back out of the agreement, and continued to use the Illinois Central Depot. The Chicago and North Western Railway, not part of the original agreement, considered switching to the new station from its Wells Street Station but deferred instead. In 1911 it built the Chicago and North Western Passenger Terminal for its operations.

The remaining four original companies used the station when it opened in 1881. The headhouse of the Union Depot, a narrow building, fronted onto Canal Street and stretched from Madison Street to Adams Street. Tracks led into the station from the south, and platforms occupied a strip of land between the back of the headhouse and the bank of the Chicago River. South of the station, Adams, Jackson, and Van Buren Streets rose over the tracks and the river on bridges. The station, along with its successor, was effectively two back-to-back stub-end terminals. Virtually all trains arriving would terminate there, and passengers traveling further would need to change trains.

=== Replacement ===
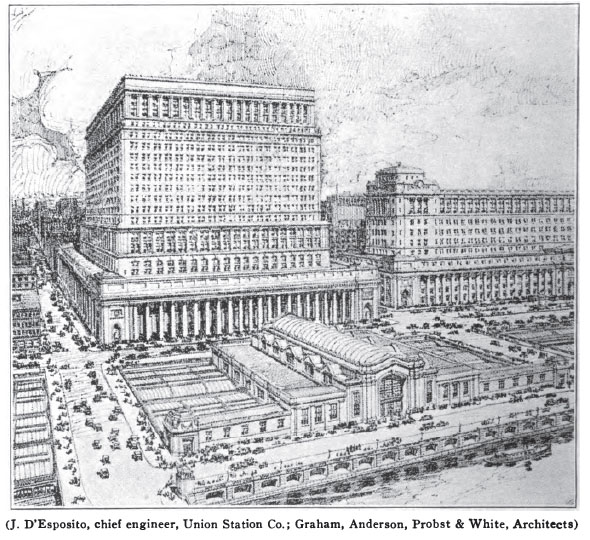
The 1922 proposal for Union Station included a taller tower of offices above the terminal, but only the lower stories for railroad offices were completed.

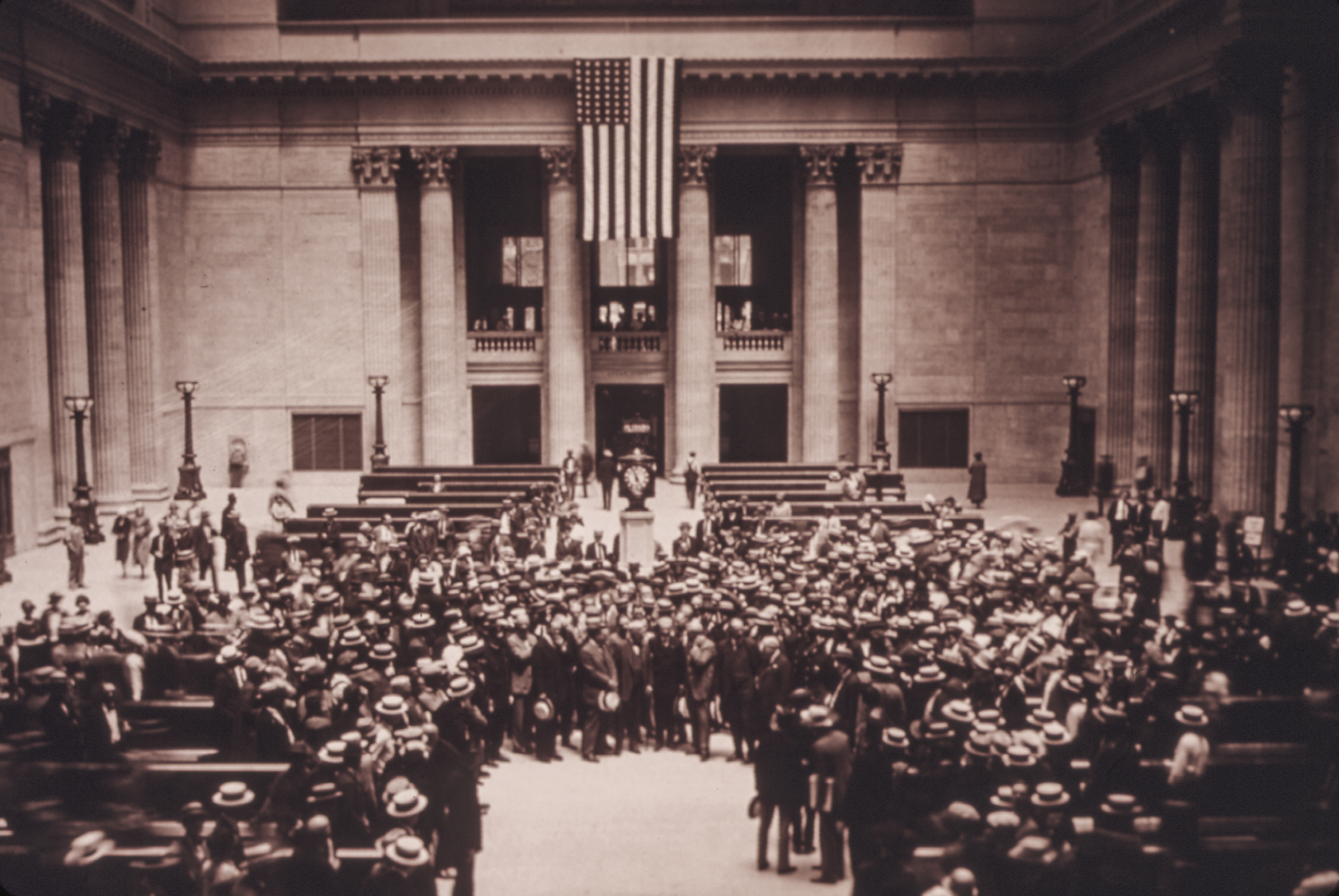
Dedication of the new station in 1925

Growth in passenger traffic, as well as a civic push to consolidate numerous railroad terminals, led to a proposal for an enlarged Union Station on the same site. The second Union Station would be built by the Chicago Union Station Company. This was a new company formed by all the railroads that had used the first station, save for the Chicago and Alton, which became a tenant in the new station. The Pennsylvania Railroad, then the U.S.'s largest railroad company, planned and directed the project.

The architectural firm was D. H. Burnham & Company (known for its lead architect Daniel Burnham, who died before construction began). The successor firm of Graham, Anderson, Probst and White completed the work. Work began on the massive project in 1913, and required purchasing adjacent properties and moving freight facilities. Construction stalled during World War I, and resumed in 1919. The station finally opened on May 16, 1925, twelve years after construction began; some viaduct work continued into 1927. The construction cost, funded by the railroad companies involved, was projected to be $65 million, but ended up costing $75 million. Construction was delayed several times by World War I, labor shortages and strikes. The construction of the station also involved the demolition and relocation of some previously existing buildings such as the Butler Brothers Warehouse along the Chicago River. It is one of about a dozen monumental Beaux-Arts railroad stations that were among the most complicated architectural programs of the era called the "American Renaissance", combining traditional architecture with engineering technology, circulation patterning and urban planning. Union Station was hailed as an outstanding achievement in railroad facility planning at the time.

=== Wartime, decline, and resurgence ===
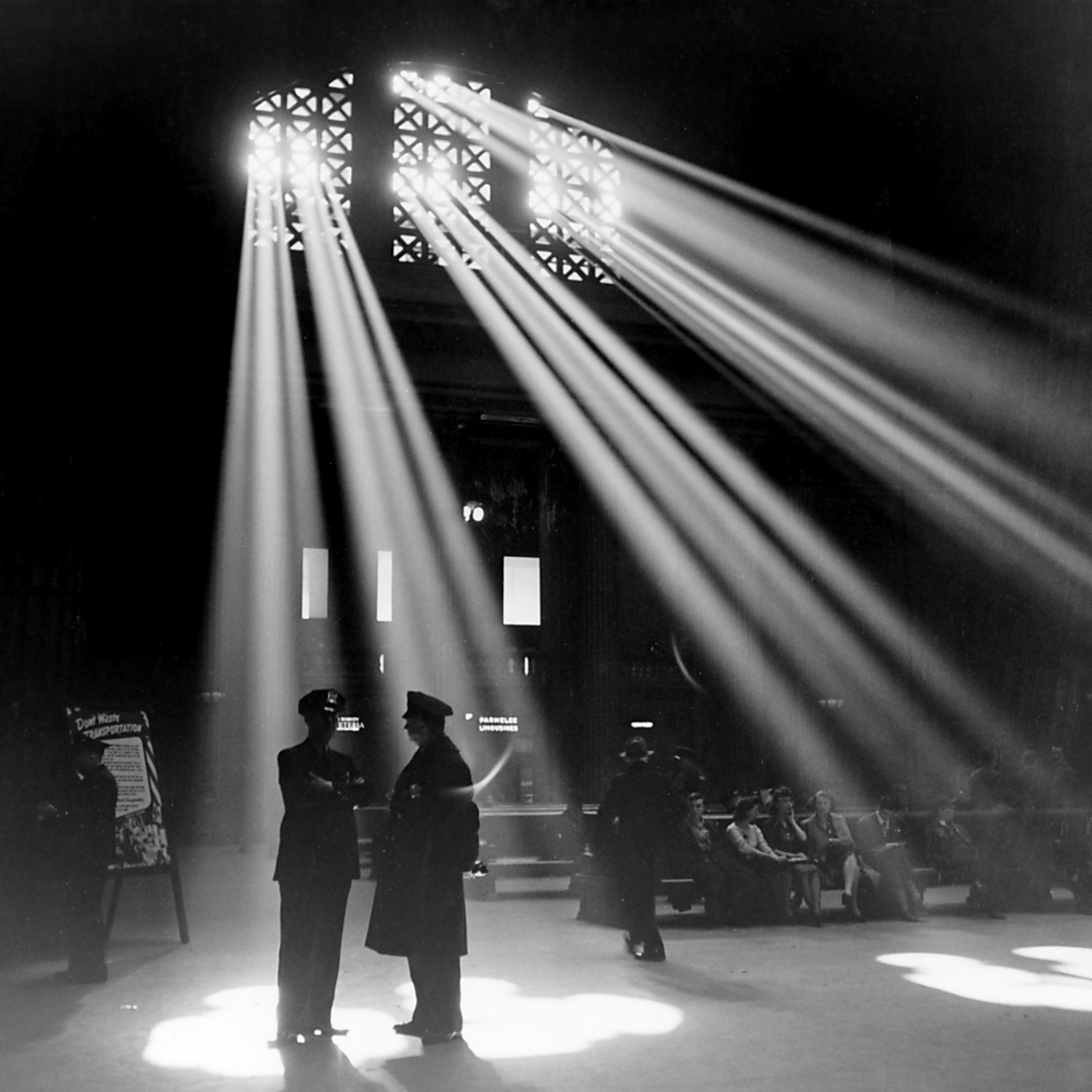
Interior of the station in April 1943, by Jack Delano

During World War II, Union Station was at its busiest, handling as many as 300 trains and 100,000 passengers daily, many of them soldiers. Illustrator Norman Rockwell captured this era with his cover painting for a December 1944 issue of The Saturday Evening Post, depicting the station jammed with Christmas travelers. After the war, the growth of highway construction and private ownership of automobiles caused a severe decline in American passenger-rail ridership, including at Union Station.

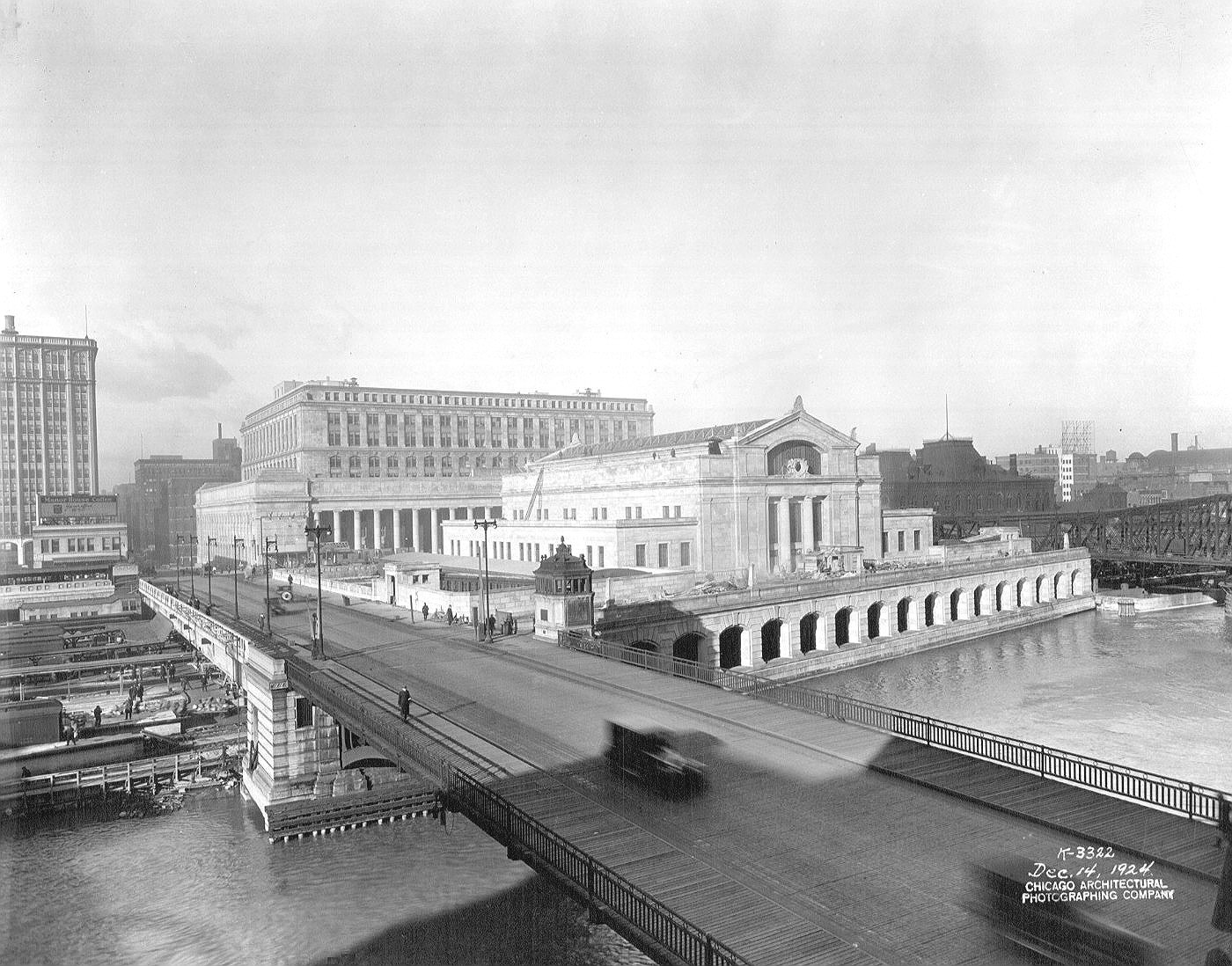
Concourse building (foreground) and headhouse (background), 1924. The concourse building has since been replaced by modern skyscrapers.

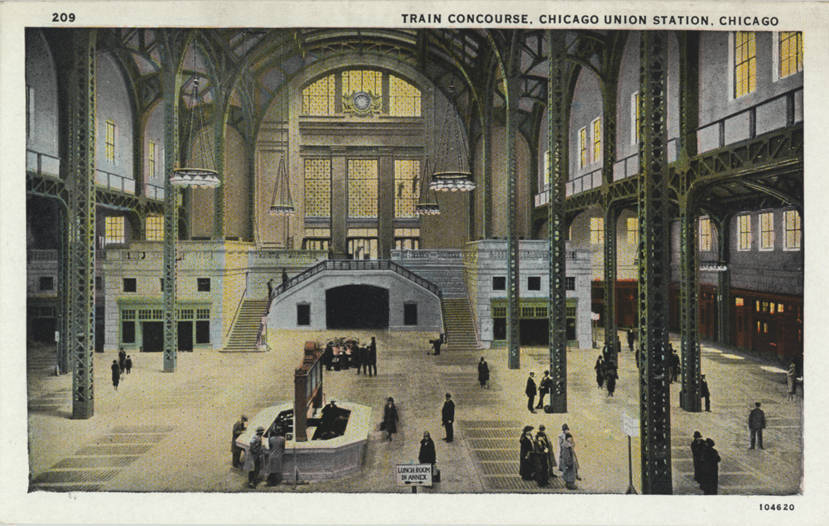
Original concourse interior, 1925, since demolished. Only the headhouse remains above ground, the concourse is now entirely underground.

In 1969, the station's owner demolished the concourse building, making way for a modern office tower. A new and modernized, though less grand, concourse was constructed beneath the tower. In May 1971, the national railroad Amtrak was formed to take over long-distance passenger train service, while commuter trains remained privately operated. In 1980, the station's Fred Harvey restaurant experienced a large fire. The space was damaged, windows on Clinton Street were destroyed, and the space was left vacant since then.

In 1984, Amtrak bought out the shares of Chicago Union Station Company held by Burlington Northern (successor to the Burlington Route) and the Milwaukee Road, becoming sole owner of the station.

In the 1990s, Lucien Lagrange Associates made some patchwork renovations, including to the Great Hall and its skylight, which had been blacked-out since World War II. Restoration of Union Station continued. Numerous spaces within the station had yet to be renovated, and many sat unused, especially within the station building.

=== 21st century ===
Adams Street Entrance along the Chicago River

After the September 11, 2001 attacks, Amtrak closed the pair of taxicab drives in the name of security. Passenger traffic has increased and is exceeding the design capacity of the 1991 renovation. On May 1, 2002, the station was designated a Chicago Landmark, protecting its exterior, rooflines, and public interior spaces from alterations. The status protects all exteriors, rooflines, the central lightwell, vehicular drives, the Great Hall, skylight, and select interior features – balconies, porticos, corridors, lobbies, and stairs.

In 2010, Amtrak (the current owners of the Chicago Union Station Company) announced plans to air-condition the Great Hall for the first time since the 1960s. That year a Chicago Tribune investigation revealed high levels of diesel soot on the underground platforms of Union Station. Metra established an "Emissions Task Force" to study this problem and recommend solutions to improve air quality in the underground areas. In 2011, its lighting system was replaced with more energy-efficient light bulbs and motion sensors, reducing the station's annual carbon emissions by 4 million tons. Custom steel lighting covers were added to top these safety/light towers, helping them blend in with the overall neoclassical style of the station.

Madison Street Entrance near Ogilvie Transportation Center

New entrance on Clinton Street

In 2011, the city held a public meeting to discuss goals for the station, aiming to accommodate the expected 40 percent growth in passengers by 2040. In the following year, city agencies joined to publish a master plan for renovating and improving Union Station. Short-term goals were to improve station entrances and expand waiting rooms, as well as enhance bus lanes on Clinton and Canal Streets and create a bus terminal (completed in 2016). Goals for the next five to ten years included widening commuter platforms, using unutilized mail platforms (including an extra-long through platform) for intercity passenger trains, adding more through tracks and platforms, reorganizing facilities for better capacity and flow, increasing height clearances of the tracks, and improving street access to and from the station. Long-term, proposals include increasing capacity and improving the ambiance of the station by significantly expanding or replacing station facilities in the 200 or 300 blocks of South Canal Street. Adding track and platform capacity along Clinton Street or Canal Street was also analyzed.

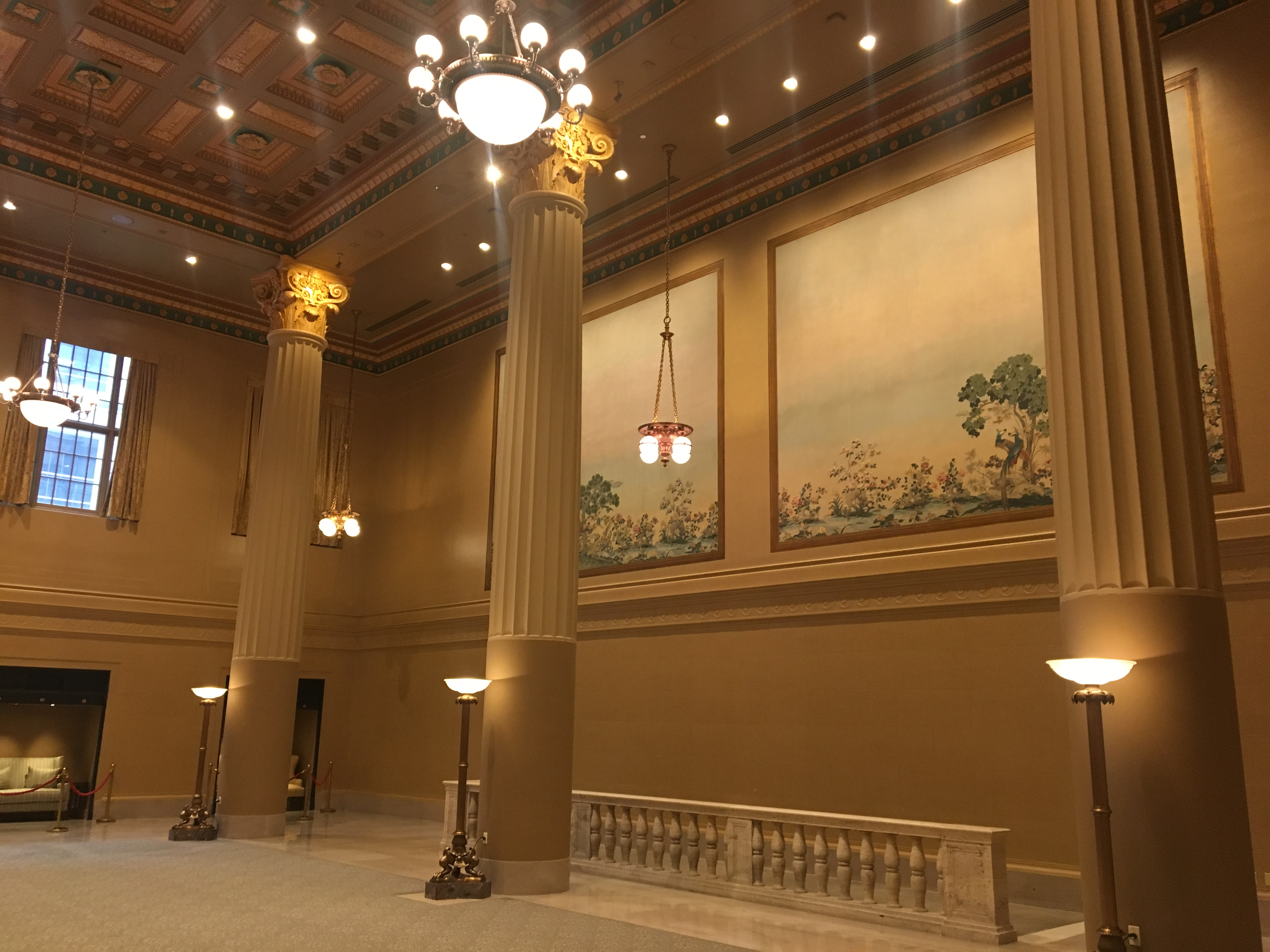
Part of the restored Burlington Room

In June 2015, Amtrak announced that it would renovate the station, including opening up long-closed spaces and replacing the worn staircases with marble from the original quarry near Rome. In 2016, the women's lounge was restored, renamed the Burlington Room, and opened for use as an events space. The space was initially a women's lounge, and later became an Amtrak warehouse. It then suffered years of neglect and water damage, and was eventually closed off. In November 2016, the room was renovated and reopened. An architecture firm removed wooden decking that divided the space into two floors, and took out a drop ceiling that defaced the original ornate ceiling. The work restored the room's columns and chandeliers, including creating several replica chandeliers. The room also has four French block murals of landscape scenery; three of the four were cleaned and preserved, while the fourth was reproduced. An original mirror and banister were added to the room's north end. The space was improved for events with color-changing lights and an audiovisual system.

In 2016, Amtrak held a competition for renovations and development of Union Station. The winner, Riverside Investment & Development Co., proposed multiple changes, including new retail, a food hall, and two 12-story towers. The plans followed an unrealized 2007 plan for a tower addition above Union Station.

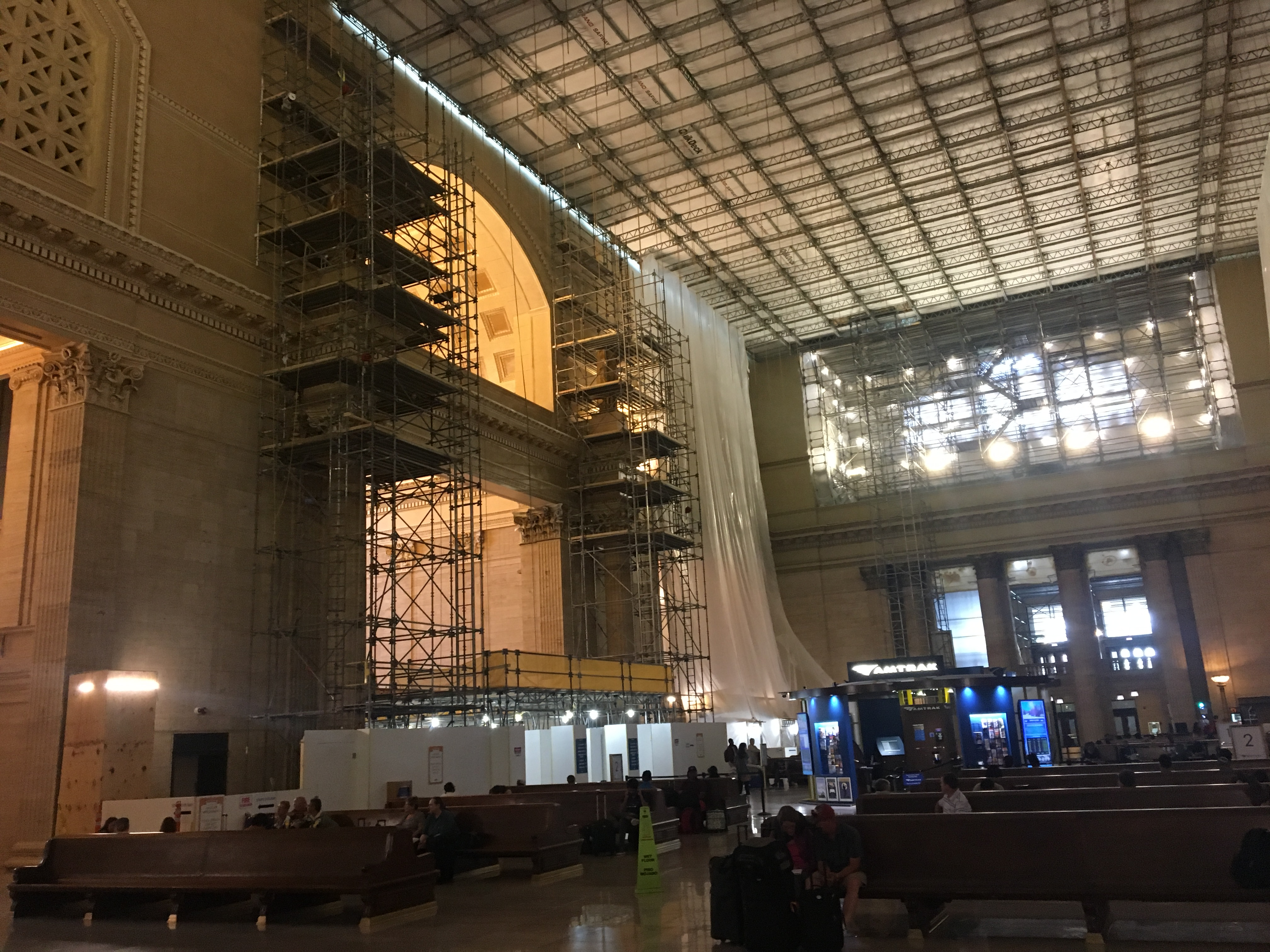
Great Hall renovations in 2018

From 2018 to 2019, a $22 million restoration of the Great Hall, including restoring original detailing and rebuilding the large skylight, was completed, increasing natural light by 50 to 60 percent. The skylight, originally built in the 1920s, suffered from decades of harsh weather, leading to countless patchwork repairs, many of which blocked light from entering the Great Hall. The 2018–19 renovation restored the historic skylight to its original appearance, and added another glass skylight atop it. The new skylight is better-designed to prevent water and snow damage, and increases light entering the Great Hall.

In 2018, Riverside Investment & Development Co. released a revised plan that included a seven-story addition above Union Station, adding 404 apartments to the building. The planned design was created by Solomon Cordwell Buenz, resembling Burnham's earlier proposed tower above the station, designed to handle the weight. The addition was to be clad in glass and light bronze, differentiated from the station's design as recommended in its landmark designation. The developers also planned to renovate the existing upper levels of Union Station's headhouse, adding 330 hotel rooms. The proposal was met with mixed reactions by preservationists and architectural critics, with Blair Kamin, the Chicago Tribune's critic, calling it "banal" and "top-heavy". Several months later, the developers announced they were cancelling the plan for the seven-story addition, instead constructing only a single additional penthouse floor, set back to not be visible from the street. The revised plan kept hotel rooms in the station's upper floors, and added a proposed 50-story office tower replacing the station's underutilized parking garage.

In 2018, Amtrak announced plans to redevelop the former Fred Harvey restaurant space into a multi-level food hall, using funds from the sale of its parking garage. A new entrance and canopy would be installed on Clinton Street, and new windows would replace the bricked-up windows. The food hall was planned to open in the summer of 2020.

Aerial of the Union Station Transit Center with the BMO Tower on the right

In September 2019, Union Station's 700-car parking garage permanently closed in order to be demolished. Its replacement is the 700-foot (210 m), 1.5-million-square-foot (140,000 m^{2}), BMO Tower, opened in 2021. The skyscraper includes a 1.5-acre (0.61 ha) park above 400 parking spaces. The construction did not affect the pedway from the terminal to its adjacent Union Station Transit Center.

In March 2020, U.S. Representative for Illinois Dan Lipinski filed a bill to shift operational control of the terminal from Amtrak to Metra. Lipinski noted that Metra utilizes the station much more than Amtrak does, and operates its other large stations more effectively than Amtrak operates Union Station. Amtrak officials threatened to stop service to Union Station if the change is to be made, stating it would be impossible to operate and would serve as a blockade to regional and national Amtrak service. Congress was out of session during the COVID-19 pandemic, and aimed to discuss Lipinski's bill once sessions resumed.

Track 19/28 is one of the few existing tracks that runs through the station

In October 2026, Metra released its draft Systemwide Network Plan for regional rail. In the draft plan is a proposed crosstown service that would rely on through-running at Union Station. The service would run every 15 minutes and begin at O'Hare Transfer on Metra's North Central Service and terminate at 80th Avenue/Tinley Park on the Rock Island District via a new connection along the St. Charles Air Line. This would be the first through-running service for the station as all Metra and Amtrak trains currently originate and terminate at Union Station and none treat it as an intermediate station. Metra states that initial service could use existing Track 19/28 (one track in total, just named differently in the North and South Concourses, respectively) which already runs along the station's east side along the Chicago River. Full service would require the construction of a second track, an option being connecting Track 17 with Track 26. Metra estimates that the Track 17 to 26 connection would cost $500 million. The entire project is expected to cost $5.1 billion is and there is not timeline for construction

In November 2026, Amtrak began construction on the station's first ever level boarding platforms for passenger service in the South Concourse. This will involve converting unused platforms previously used for mail service into passenger platforms and will be served by Tracks 30 through 38. A new waiting room with restrooms and climate control will also be built. Trains that use Siemens Venture, Amfleet, Horizon, and Viewliner equipment are likely to use the platforms. The $112 million project will take 30 months to complete and is the first of many projects of the Chicago Hub Improvement Program (CHIP).

== In popular culture ==
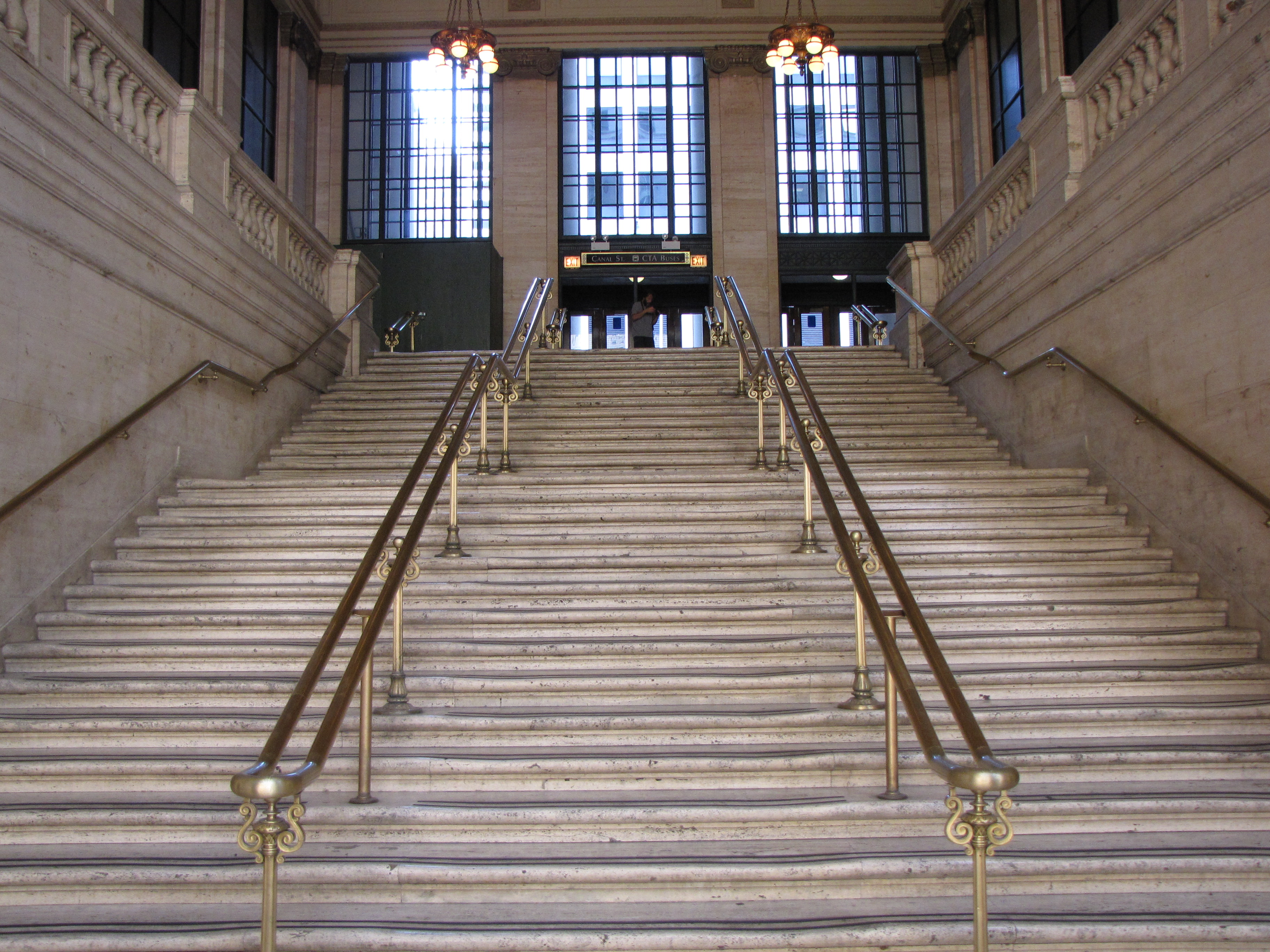
One of the two grand staircases, where movie scenes such as The Untouchables were filmed

Union Station is used as a filming location in television and movies. Films in which the station appears include The Sting (1973), Silver Streak (1976), On the Right Track (1981), Doctor Detroit (1983), The Untouchables (1987), The Package (1989), My Best Friend's Wedding (1997), Flags of Our Fathers (2006), Public Enemies (2009), and Man of Steel (2013). It featured prominently in a third-season episode of the TV series ER (1994) titled "Union Station". It was also featured in Season 4, Episode 8 of the TV series Fargo (2020), although it was depicted as Kansas City Union Station. A 2016 exhibit in Union Station showcased the station and Chicago's use as a filming location in American cinema. A photograph of Union Station is featured on the cover of To All Trains, the final album by the Chicago rock band Shellac.

== Amtrak ridership statistics ==
In 2019, Amtrak handled 3,379,760 arrivals and departures at the station. 3,161,204 of these were coach and business class tickets, and 218,556 were first class and sleeper class tickets. 2,365,259 trips were taken on state supported Amtrak services (Blue Water, Hiawawatha Service, Hoosier State, Illinois Zephyr/Carl Sandburg, Illini/Saluki, Lincoln Service, Pere Marquette, and Wolverine), and 1,007,508 trips were taken on long-distance Amtrak services (California Zephyr, Capitol Limited, Cardinal, City of New Orleans, Empire Builder, Lake Shore Limited, Southwest Chief, and Texas Eagle).

In 2019, the average trip to/from the station was 327 miles (526 km) in distance. Among coach and business class passengers, the average trip was 263 miles (423 km) in distance, while the average trip among first and sleeper class trip was 1,243 miles (2,000 km) in distance.

Between the fiscal years 2002 and 2008, Amtrak ridership more than doubled at the station, surpassing 3.1 million in the 2008 fiscal year.

Annual Amtrak passenger traffic (arrivals + departures)
Year	Passengers (in thousands)	Change
2019	3,379.8	▲2,6%
2018	3,293.6	▼0,8%
2017	3,321.2	▲4,0%
2016	3,191.0	▼1,7%
2015	3,247.4	▼1,9%
2014	3,311.3	▼3,7%
2013	3,437.7	--

The following is the top-ten stations which receive the most ridership to/from Chicago Union Station out of the 265 that Amtrak rail services that directly connected with Chicago Union Station as of 2019:

Top station pairs by Amtrak ridership (as of 2019)
Rank	Station	City	Distance from Chicago Union Station	Connecting Amtrak services
1	Milwaukee Intermodal Station	Milwaukee, Wisconsin	86 miles (138 km)	Hiawatha, Borealis, Empire Builder
2	Gateway Transportation Center	St. Louis, Missouri	284 miles (457 km)	Lincoln Service, Texas Eagle
3	Milwaukee Airport Railroad Station	Milwaukee, Wisconsin	78 miles (126 km)	Hiawatha, Borealis
4	Uptown Station	Normal, Illinois	124 miles (200 km)	Lincoln Service, Texas Eagle
5	Illinois Terminal	Champaign, Illinois	129 miles (208 km)	City of New Orleans, Illini and Saluki
6	Ann Arbor	Ann Arbor, Michigan	243 miles (391 km)	Wolverine
7	Springfield	Springfield, Illinois	185 miles (298 km)	Lincoln Service, Texas Eagle
8	Kalamazoo Transportation Center	Kalamazoo, Michigan	138 miles (222 km)	Blue Water, Wolverine
9	Sturtevant	Sturtevant, Wisconsin	62 miles (100 km)	Hiawatha, Borealis
10	John D. Dingell Transit Center	Dearborn, Michigan	273 miles (439 km)	Wolverine

== Metra ridership statistics ==
=== Cumulative ridership ===
Cumulative weekday Metra ridership at Union Station
Period of study	Daily inbound alightings	Daily outbound boardings
Fall 2018	55,979	54,882
Fall 2016	55,565	55,494
Spring 2014	55,098	54,422
Fall 2006		54,388
Fall 2002		49,883
Fall 1999		51,221
Fall 1997		48,579
Fall 1995		43,920
Fall 1993		42,301
Fall 1989		42,409
Fall 1987		39,510
Spring 1985		35,968
Spring 1983		32,834

Cumulative weekday Metra ridership at Union Station by time of day
Period of study	Inbound alightings				Outbound boardings			
Period of study	AM peak	Midday	PM peak	Evening	AM peak	Midday	PM peak	Evening
Fall 2018	49,911	4,442	2,108	518	1,542	4,994	43,887	4,459
Fall 2016	47,725	4,653	2,643	544	1,561	5,039	43,439	5,455
Spring 2014	48,066	3,985	2,492	555	1,587	4,542	42,845	5,448

== See also ==
- Architecture of Chicago
- List of historical passenger rail services in Chicago
- List of busiest railway stations in North America
- Illinois Service
- Missouri River Runner
