= List of Pennsylvania Railroad passenger trains =

The Pennsylvania Railroad operated dozens of named passenger trains, and in fact, was the largest passenger train operator in the US.

All trains discontinued unless otherwise noted.

Symbol legend
| Symbol | Indicates |
|---|---|
| winters-only | winter-only |
| summers-only | summer-only |
| weekends-only | weekend-only |

== A ==
- The Admiral 1939 — 1941
  Washington, DC — New York, NY
  renamed The Constitution
- The Admiral 1941 — 1971
  Chicago, IL — New York, NY
- The Advance Congressional 1941 — 1947
  New York, NY — Washington, DC
- The Advance East Coast Champion 1957
  New York, NY — Miami, FL
- The Advance Federal 1946
  Boston, MA — Washington, DC
- Advance Florida Special 1938 — 1941
  New York, NY — Miami, FL
- The Advance General 1940 — 1941
  Chicago, IL — New York, NY
  renamed The Admiral
- The Advance Golden Arrow 1944 — 1946
  New York, NY — Chicago, IL
  renamed The Golden Arrow
- The Advance Senator 1947
  Washington, DC — Boston, MA
- The Advance Senator 1947
  Washington, DC — Boston, MA
  through cars from Birmingham Special and Camillia
- The Advance Silver Meteor 1942 — 1947
  New York, NY — Miami, FL
  renamed Silver Star
- The Afternoon Congressional 1952 — 1971
  New York, NY — Washington, DC
- The Afternoon Keystone 1961 — 1969
  New York, NY — Washington, DC
- The Afternoon Steeler 1950 — 1958
  Pittsburgh, PA — Cleveland, OH via Salem, OH, and Alliance, OH
- Aiken-Augusta Special 1928 — 1953
  New York, NY — Charlotte, NC — Aiken/Augusta, GA via SOU
  renamed Augusta Special
- The Airway Limited 1929 — 1932
  New York, NY — Port Columbus, OH
  as part of air-rail service to Los Angeles, CA
- Akron & Cleveland Express 1912 — 1918
  Chicago, IL — Pittsburgh, PA via Youngstown, OH
  renamed Akron Express
- Akron-Cleveland Express 1920
  Chicago, IL — Pittsburgh, PA via Youngstown, OH
  became train #142
- Akron Express 1918 — 1919
  Chicago, IL — Pittsburgh, PA via Youngstown, OH
  renamed Pittsburgh Night Express
- The Akronite 1936 — 1958
  New York, NY — Akron, OH via Youngstown, OH
- The Alexandria 1941 — 1958
  New York, NY — Washington, DC
- The All-Florida Special 1924 — 1925
  New York, NY — Florida via SAL
  renamed Orange Blossom Special
- The All-Florida Special 1925 — 1927
  New York, NY — Florida via SAL
- The Allegheny 1948 — 1959
  St. Louis, MO — Pittsburgh, PA
- Altoona Express 1919 — 1921
  Philadelphia, PA — Altoona, PA
- The American 1925 — 1956
  New York, NY — St. Louis, MO via Dayton, OH
- Anthracite Express 1901 — 1941
  Philadelphia, PA — Pottsville, PA — Wilkes-Barre, PA
- The Arlington 1933 — 1962
  Washington, DC — New York, NY
- Atlanta Special 1892 — 1895
  New York, NY — Washington, DC — Atlanta, GA via SAL
- Atlantic City & Washington Express 1899 — 1903
  Washington, DC — Atlantic City, NJ
  renamed Washington & Atlantic City Express
- Atlantic City & Washington Express 1907 — 1916
  Washington, DC — Atlantic City, NJ
  renamed Atlantic City Express/Washington Express
- Atlantic City Express/Washington Express 1916 — 1942
  Washington, DC — Atlantic City, NJ
- Atlantic City Limited/New York Limited 1919 — 1931
  New York, NY — Atlantic City, NJ
- Atlantic City Special 1904 — 1907
  Washington, DC — Atlantic City, NJ
  renamed Atlantic City & Washington Express
- Atlantic Coast Line Express 1896 — 1903
  St. Augustine, FL/Tampa, FL — Washington, DC — New York, NY via ACL
- Atlantic Coast Line Express 1903 — 1921
  Jacksonville, FL — Washington, DC — New York, NY via ACL
  renamed Coast Line Florida Mail
- Atlantic Coast Line Limited 1925
  Jacksonville, FL — New York, NY
- Atlantic Express 1906 — 1913
  St. Louis, MO — Pittsburgh, PA via Piqua, OH
- Atlantic Express 1913 — 1935
  Chicago, IL — Columbus, OH — Pittsburgh, PA
  renamed The Ohioan
- Augusta Special 1915 — 1966
  New York, NY — Augusta, GA via SOU

== B ==
- Baltimore Day Express 1958 — 1968
  Buffalo, NY — Baltimore, MD — Washington, DC
- Bankers Special 1928 — 1930
  Jersey City, NJ — Philadelphia, PA
- Bar Harbor Express 1917 — 1960
  Washington, DC — Bangor, ME — Rockland, ME
- The Bay State 1940 — 1975
  Philadelphia, PA — New Haven, CT — Boston, MA via NYNH&H
- Birmingham Special 1909 — 1975
  New York, NY — Washington, DC — Atlanta, GA — Birmingham, AL via SOU
- The Blue Diamond 1965
  Wilmington, DE — Delmar, DE
  6-month experimental train
- Blue Grass Special 1952 — 1959
  Chicago, IL — Louisville, KY
- Boston Express 1892 — 1901
  Washington, DC — New York, NY — Boston, MA
  renamed Federal Express
- Boston & Southern Express 1892 — 1901
  Boston, MA — New York, NY — Washington, DC
  renamed Federal Express
- Boston & Washington Night Express 1877 — 1884
  Boston, MA — New York, NY — Washington, DC
  renamed Fast Mail
- Boston, Philadelphia & Washington Night Express 1876 — 1877
  Boston, MA — New York, NY — Philadelphia, PA — Washington, DC
  renamed Boston & Washington Night Express
- Boston-Pittsburgh-St. Louis Express 1917 — 1918
  Boston, MA — Pittsburgh, PA — St. Louis, MO
- The Broadway Limited 1912 — 1995
  New York, NY — Chicago, IL
- The Buckeye 1936 — 1956
  Cleveland, OH — Pittsburgh, PA via Youngstown, OH
- The Buckeye 1957 — 1969
  Cincinnati, OH — Chicago, IL via Richmond, IN, and Logansport, IN
- The Buckeye Limited 1934 — 1936
  Cleveland, OH — New York, NY via Salem, OH
  renamed The Clevelander
- Bucks County Express 1962 — 1978
  Philadelphia, PA Suburban Station — Trenton, NJ
- Buffalo & Northern Express 1904 — 1916
  Philadelphia, PA — Buffalo, NY
- The Buffalo Day Express 1900 — 1968
  Washington, DC — Baltimore, MD — Harrisburg, PA — Buffalo, NY
- Buffalo Express 1900 — 1916
  Buffalo, NY — Philadelphia, PA
- Buffalo Night Express 1900 — 1916
  Washington, DC / Philadelphia, PA — Buffalo, NY
- Buffalo, Erie & Philadelphia Express 1908 — 1916
  Buffalo, NY / Erie, PA — Philadelphia, PA
- Buffalo Special 1906 — 1916
  Pittsburgh, PA — Buffalo, NY
- The Bullet 1937 — 1947
  Easton, MD — Wilmington, DE

== C ==
- The Camilla 1947 — 1948
  New York, NY — Florida via SAL
  renamed The Sunland
- Capital Express 1904 — 1913
  Pittsburgh, PA — Indianapolis, IN — St. Louis, MO via Piqua, OH
- Capital Express 1913 — 1927
  Washington, DC — Pittsburgh, PA
- Capitol Express 1925 — 1929
  Indianapolis, IN — Pittsburgh, PA
- Carolina-Florida Special 1923 — 1929
  New York, NY — Florida via SAL
  renamed New York-Florida Limited
- Carolina Golfer 1929 — 1930
  New York, NY — Raleigh, NC — Pinehurst, NC via SAL/NS
- Carpenter Express 1962 — 1978
  Philadelphia, PA Suburban Station — Chestnut Hill, PA
- Catskill Express 1893 — 1900
  Philadelphia, PA — Jersey City, NJ
- The Cavalier 1927 — 1956
  New York, NY — Cape Charles, VA via ferry boat Norfolk, VA
- The Champion 1939 — 1979
  New York, NY — Miami, FL
- The Champion (East Coast) 1943 — 1949
  New York, NY — east coast of Florida
  renamed East Coast Champion
- The Champion (West Coast) 1943 — 1949
  New York, NY — west coast of Florida
  renamed West Coast Champion
- Chesapeake & Ohio Express 1894 — 1917
  New York, NY — Washington, DC
  renamed Southern Railway & Chesapeake & Ohio Express
- Chester Countian 1965 — 1968
  Harrisburg, PA — Philadelphia, PA Suburban Station
- The Chicago & Cincinnati Express 1885 — 1898
  Chicago, IL — Cincinnati, OH
  renamed Cleveland & Cincinnati Express
- The Chicago & New York Express 1906 — 1909
  Chicago, IL — Pittsburgh, PA
- The Chicago & St. Louis Express 1893 — 1912
  New York, NY — Columbus, OH — Chicago, IL / St. Louis, MO
  split into St. Louis Express and Chicago Express
- The Chicago Arrow 1935 — 1949
  Detroit, MI — Chicago, IL
- The Chicago Day Express 1913 — 1929
  Pittsburgh, PA — Chicago, IL
- Chicago Daylight Express 1906 — 1952
  Louisville, KY / Cincinnati, OH — Chicago, IL
  renamed The Red Bird
- Chicago Daylight Special 1906
  Louisville, KY / Cincinnati, OH — Chicago, IL
- Chicago Express 1904 — 1914
  Louisville, KY / Cincinnati, OH — Chicago, IL
  renamed Chicago Night Express
- Chicago Express 1913
  Pittsburgh, PA — Chicago, IL
  renamed Metropolitan Express
- Chicago Express 1929 — 1942
  Philadelphia, PA — Chicago, IL
- Chicago Limited 1893 — 1913
  New York, NY — Chicago, IL via Columbus, OH
  renamed Manhattan Limited
- Chicago Midnight Express 1915 — 1917
  Louisville, KY — Chicago, IL
  renamed Chicago Night Express
- Chicago Midnight Special 1906 — 1914
  Cincinnati, OH — Chicago, IL
  renamed Chicago Night Express
- Chicago Night Express 1914 — 1952
  Louisville, KY / Cincinnati, OH — Chicago, IL
- Chicago Special 1890 — 1906
  Louisville, KY / Cincinnati, OH — Chicago, IL
  renamed Chicago Daylight Special
- Chicago Special 1904 — 1913
  renamed Metropolitan Express
- The Chicagoan 1923 — 1928
  Washington, DC — Chicago, IL
- Cincinnati & New York Express 1906 — 1913
  Cincinnati, OH — New York, NY
  renamed Metropolitan Express
- Cincinnati Commercial Express 1916 — 1932
  Pittsburgh, PA — Cincinnati, OH
- Cincinnati Daylight Express 1906 — 1952
  Chicago, IL — Cincinnati, OH via Logansport, IN
  renamed The Red Bird
- Cincinnati Express 1900 — 1930
  Pittsburgh, PA — Cincinnati, OH
  renamed The Red Knight
- Cincinnati Express 1933 — 1940
  Cincinnati, OH — Pittsburgh, PA
- The Cincinnati Limited 1920 — 1971
  New York, NY — Cincinnati, OH
- Cincinnati Midnight Express 1915 — 1916
  Chicago, IL — Cincinnati, OH
  renamed The Southland
- Cincinnati Midnight Special 1906 — 1914
  Chicago, IL — Cincinnati, OH
  renamed Chicago Night Express
- Cincinnati Night Express 1914 — 1952
  Cincinnati, OH — Logansport, IN — Chicago, IL
- Cincinnati Special 1904 — 1906
  Chicago, IL — Cincinnati, OH
  renamed Cincinnati Daylight Express
- Cleveland & Cincinnati Express 1897 — 1911
  New York, NY — Cleveland, OH / Cincinnati, OH
  renamed Cleveland, Cincinnati & Chicago Express
- Cleveland, Cincinnati & Chicago Express 1911 — 1930
  New York, NY — Chicago, IL
- Cleveland Express 1920
  Pittsburgh, PA — Cleveland, OH
- Cleveland Night Special 1908 — 1909
  Cleveland, OH — Columbus, OH
- The Cleveland Special 1904 — 1908
  Pittsburgh, PA — Cleveland, OH
- The Cleveland Special 1908 — 1916
  Cleveland, OH — Columbus, OH
- The Cleveland-Youngstown-Pittsburgh Express 1926 — 1936
  Crestline, OH — Alliance, OH — Youngstown, OH — Pittsburgh, PA
- The Clevelander 1916 — 1934
  New York, NY — Cleveland, OH
  renamed The Buckeye Limited
- The Clevelander 1936 — 1965
  New York, NY — Cleveland, OH via Youngstown, OH
- Coast Line Florida Mail 1921 — 1933
  New York, NY — Jacksonville, FL via ACL
- The Colonial 1939 — 1973
  Boston, MA — New York, NY — Washington, DC
- Colonial Express 1892 — 1939
  Boston, MA — New York, NY — Washington, DC
  renamed The Colonial
- Columbian Express 1891 — 1893
  Jersey City, NJ — Chicago, IL
  for World's Fair
- Commercial Express 1913 — 1942
  New York, NY — St. Louis, MO
- The Commodore 1933 — 1938
  Philadelphia, PA — Long Branch, NJ
- The Congressional 1931 — 1952
  New York, NY — Washington, DC
  renamed The Afternoon Congressional
- Congressional Express 1882 — 1885
  Washington, DC — New York, NY
  renamed Congressional Limited Express
- Congressional Limited 1906 — 1931
  New York, NY — Washington, DC
  renamed The Congressional
- Congressional Limited Express 1885 — 1906
  New York, NY — Washington, DC
  renamed Congressional Limited
- The Consolidated Champions 1965
  New York, NY — Jacksonville, FL via ACL
- The Constitution 1933 — 1956
  New York, NY — Washington, DC
  renamed The President
- The Crescent 1938 — 1970
  New York, NY — Atlanta, GA — New Orleans, LA via SOU/A&WP/L&N
- Crescent Limited 1925 — 1938
  New York, NY — New Orleans, LA via SOU/A&WP/L&N
  renamed The Crescent
- Cresson Special 1888 — 1905
  Pittsburgh, PA — Cresson, PA
- Cyclone Express 1884 — 1885
  Chicago, IL — Cincinnati, OH
  renamed train #12

== D-E ==
- Day Express 1916 — 1942
  Pittsburgh, PA — New York, NY
- Dayton Express 1928 — 1933
  Chicago, IL — Dayton, OH — Springfield, OH
- Daytonian 1946 — 1948
  Chicago, IL — Dayton, OH
- Delaware Valley Express 1904 — 1932
  Philadelphia, PA — Trenton, NJ — East Stroudsburg, PA
- Delaware Valley Express 1962 — 1972
  Philadelphia, PA Suburban Station — Trenton, NJ
- Del-Mar-Va Express 1926 — 1958
  New York, NY — Philadelphia, PA — Cape Charles, VA via boat ferry Norfolk, VA
- The Detroit Arrow 1935 — 1949
  Chicago, IL — Ft. Wayne, IN — Detroit, MI
- Detroit Express 1929 — 1932
  Pittsburgh, PA — Detroit, MI
  renamed The Fort Dearborn
- Detroit Express 1948 — 1958
  Pittsburgh, PA — Detroit, MI
- Dominion Express 1913 — 1958
  Washington, DC / Philadelphia, PA — Sunbury, PA — Buffalo, NY
- The Duquesne 1929 — 1971
  New York, NY — Pittsburgh, PA
  renamed The Keystone
- The Duquesne Express 1921 — 1929
  New York, NY — Pittsburgh, PA bypassing Philadelphia, PA
  renamed The Potomac
- The Duquesne Special 1906 — 1916
  Buffalo, NY — Pittsburgh, PA
- Early Bird Express 1962 — 1978
  Trenton, NJ — Philadelphia, PA Suburban Station
- The East Coast Champion 1949 — 1965
  New York, NY — Miami, FL
  renamed The Consolidated Champions
- The East Wind 1940 — 1946
  Washington, DC — Worcester, MA — Lowell, MA — Exeter, NH — Portland, ME — Bangor, ME
- Eastern & Southern Express 1904 — 1906
  Chicago, IL — Louisville, KY
  renamed Southern Express
- Eastern Express 1888 — 1942
  Chicago, IL — New York, NY via Columbus, OH
- Eastern Mail 1898 — 1920
  Chicago, IL — New York, NY
  renamed Mail
- Eastern Mail 1920
  St. Louis, MO — Pittsburgh, PA
- The Edison 1931 — 1971
  New York, NY — Washington, DC
- The Embassy 1933 — 1981
  New York, NY — Washington, DC
- Erie & Philadelphia Express 1904 — 1908
  Erie, PA — Philadelphia, PA
  renamed Buffalo, Erie & Philadelphia Express
- Erie, Buffalo & Rochester Express 1893 — 1914
  Philadelphia, PA — Buffalo, NY / Erie, PA
- Erie Express 1902
  Harrisburg, PA — Erie, PA
- Erie Express 1919 — 1948
  Pittsburgh, PA — Erie, PA
- Erie Mail 1869 — 1901
  Harrisburg, PA — Erie, PA
  split into Northern Express and Southern Express
- Erie Night Express 1913 — 1914
  Erie, PA — Philadelphia, PA
- Evening Keystone 1956 — 1971
  Washington, DC — New York, NY
- The Everglades 1925 — 1927
  Boston, MA — New York, NY — Washington, DC — Florida via ACL/FEC
  merged into The Everglades Limited
- The Everglades Limited 1920 — 1929
  Boston, MA — New York, NY — Washington, DC — Jacksonville, FL via ACL/FEC
  renamed Magnolia Limited
- The Executive 1941 — 1971
  New York, NY — Washington, DC
- Expo Train 1902 — 1904
  Pittsburgh, PA — Fort Wayne, IN — Columbia City, IN — Logansport, IN — St. Louis, MO
  for World's Fair
- Exposition Express 1901
  St. Louis, MO — Columbus, OH — Akron, OH — Buffalo, NY via Erie
  for World's Fair
- Exposition Flyer 1895 — 1896
  New York, NY — Atlanta, GA
  for Cotton States Expo
  renamed New York & Florida Short Line Limited

== F ==
- F.F.V. Limited 1889 — 1968
  New York, NY — Cincinnati, OH
- Fast Line 1847 — 1904
  Philadelphia, PA — Pittsburgh, PA
  split into Main Line Express and Philadelphia Express
  among oldest named trains in the US
- Fast Mail 1884 — 1891
  Boston, MA — Washington, DC
  renamed Southern Fast Mail
- Fast Mail 1896 — 1904
  New York, NY — Chicago, IL
  renamed Chicago Special
- Fast Mail 1929 — 1930
  Chicago, IL — New York, NY
  renamed The New Yorker
- Fast Southern Express 1880 — 1892
  New York, NY — Washington, DC — New Orleans, LA
  renamed New York & Washington Fast Express
- The Federal 1939 — 1971
  Boston, MA — Washington, DC
- Federal Express 1900 — 1939
  Washington, DC — New York, NY — Boston, MA
  renamed The Federal
- The Flamingo 1909 — 1918
  New York, NY — Miami, FL via SAL
- The Flamingo 1929 — 1933
  Chicago, IL — Louisville, KY — Florida via L&N/CofG/ACL
  changed interchange point
- The Flamingo 1933 — 1943
  Chicago, IL — Cincinnati, OH — Florida via L&N/CofG/ACL
- Florida & Metropolitan Limited 1901 — 1903
  New York, NY — Florida via SAL
  renamed Seaboard Express
- Florida & Southwestern Express 1897 — 1903
  New York, NY — Tampa, FL / Memphis, TN via SOU
  renamed Norfolk & Western Railway & Southern Railway Express
- Florida & West Indian Limited 1896 — 1917
  New York, NY — St. Augustine, FL / Tampa, FL via ACL
  renamed Havana Special
- The Florida Arrow 1935 — 1949
  Chicago, IL — Louisville, KY — Birmingham, AL — Montgomery, AL / Miami, FL via L&N/CofG/ACL/FEC
- Florida East Coast Limited 1926 — 1927
  New York, NY — Miami, FL via ACL
  renamed Miamian
- Florida Gulf Coast Limited 1925 — 1927
  New York, NY — St. Petersburg, FL
  renamed Gulf Coast Limited
- Florida Special 1902 — 1903
  Chicago, IL — Cincinnati, OH — Atlanta, GA — Macon, GA — Jesup, GA — St. Augustine, FL
- The Florida Special 1920 — 1939
  New York, NY — Miami, FL
  renamed Florida Special (East Coast)
- The Florida Special 1947 — 1972
  New York, NY — Miami, FL
- Florida Special (East Coast) 1939 — 1947
  Boston, MA — Miami, FL
  renamed The Florida Special
- Florida Special (West Coast) 1939 — 1947
  Boston, MA — Florida
  renamed The Champion (West Coast)
- Florida Sunbeam 1930 — 1931
  Boston, MA — Florida via SAL
  renamed Seaboard Fast Mail
- Florida West Coast Limited 1923 — 1927
  New York, NY — St. Petersburg, FL via SAL
  renamed The Southerner
- Floridian 1924 — 1925
  New York, NY — Florida via SAL
  renamed Orange Blossom Special
- Flying Quaker 1936 — 1938
  Harrisburg, PA — Philadelphia, PA
  renamed The Susquehannock
- Flying Spray 1937 — 1942
  New York, NY — Atlantic City, NJ
- Forest City Special 1903 — 1920
  Pittsburgh, PA — Cleveland, OH
  renamed Cleveland Express
- The Fort Dearborn 1932 — 1938
  New York, NY — Chicago, IL
  split into Mid-City Express and The Golden Triangle
- The Fort Duquesne 1929
  Chicago, IL — Pittsburgh, PA
  renamed Fast Mail
- The Fort Hayes 1935 — 1956
  Columbus, OH — Bradford, OH — Logansport, IN — Chicago, IL
- The Fort Pitt 1947 — 1971
  Chicago, IL — Pittsburgh, PA
- Franklin City Express 1906 — 1914
  Philadelphia, PA — Ocean City, NJ / Franklin City, VA
- The Furlough 1944 — 1958
  Philadelphia, PA — Cape Charles, VA
  renamed The Mount Vernon

== G-K ==
- The General 1937 — 1971
  New York, NY — Chicago, IL
- The Golden Arrow 1929 — 1947
  Chicago, IL — New York, NY
- The Golden Triangle 1938 — 1966
  Chicago, IL — Pittsburgh, PA
- The Gotham Limited 1922 — 1956
  Chicago, IL — New York, NY
- The Governor 1937 — 1956
  Philadelphia, PA — Harrisburg, PA
  renamed Pennsy Aerotrain
- Gulf Coast Limited 1927 — 1939
  New York, NY — St. Petersburg, FL
- Gulf Coast Special 1964 — 1971
  New York, NY — Tampa, FL
- Harrisburg & Williamsport Express 1898 — 1902
  Philadelphia, PA — Williamsport, PA
  renamed Williamsport Express
- Harrisburg Express 1898 — 1904
  Philadelphia, PA — Harrisburg, PA
- Harrisburger 1965 — 1972
  Philadelphia, PA Suburban Station — Harrisburg, PA
- Havana Special 1917 — 1964
  New York, NY — Key West, FL via ACL/FEC
  renamed Gulf Coast Special
- Indiana Arrow 1936 — 1937
  Chicago, IL — Logansport, IN — Louisville, KY / Richmond, IN
- Indianapolis Limited 1950 — 1957
  New York, NY — Indianapolis, IN
- International Express 1913 — 1937
  Washington, DC / Philadelphia, PA — Harrisburg, PA — Buffalo, NY
- Iron City Express 1909 — 1953
  New York, NY — Pittsburgh, PA
- The Jacksonian 1941 — 1943
  Chicago, IL — Louisville, KY — Miami, FL via L&N/ACL/FEC
- Jamestown Limited 1906 — 1907
  New York, NY — Portsmouth, VA — Memphis, TN / Birmingham, AL via SAL
  for Jamestown Tercentennial
- The Jeffersonian 1941 — 1953
  New York, NY — St. Louis, MO
- The Judiciary 1932 — 1956
  New York, NY — Washington, DC
  renamed The Midday Congressional
- The Juniata 1927 — 1960
  St. Louis, MO — New York, NY
- The Juniata 1961 — 1971
  Pittsburgh, PA — New York, NY
- The Kentuckian 1935 — 1968
  Chicago, IL — Louisville, KY
- The Keystone 1956 — 1968
  New York, NY — Washington, DC
- Keystone Express 1891 — 1940
  Chicago, IL — Jersey City, NJ via Ft. Wayne, IN

== L ==
- The Legion 1944 — 1952
  New York, NY — Washington, DC
  renamed The Morning Congressional
- The Legislator 1932 — 1971
  New York, NY — Washington, DC
- Lehigh-Pennsylvania Express 1916 — 1932
  Phillipsburg, NJ — Easton, PA — Mount Carmel, PA — Sunbury, PA — Lock Haven, PA — Tyrone, PA — Altoona, PA via LV
  renamed Pittsburgh-Wilkes-Barre Express
- The Liberty Limited 1925 — 1957
  Washington, DC — Chicago, IL
- Limited Mail 1876
  New York, NY — Washington, DC
  renamed Boston, Philadelphia & Washington Night Express
- Lock Haven Express 1923 — 1933
  Philadelphia, PA — Lock Haven, PA
  renamed Williamsport Express
- Logansport and Fort Wayne Express 1904
  Pittsburgh, PA — Ft. Wayne, IN — Columbia City, IN — Logansport, IN — St. Louis, MO
  for World's Fair
- London Limited 1894
  Philadelphia, PA — Jersey City, NJ
- Louisville Daylight Express 1906 — 1953
  Chicago, IL — Louisville, KY
  renamed Blue Grass Special
- Louisville Daylight Special 1910
  Chicago, IL — Louisville, KY
- Louisville Express 1906 — 1910
  Chicago, IL — Louisville, KY
  renamed Louisville Daylight Special
- Louisville Midnight Express 1915 — 1917
  Chicago, IL — Louisville, KY
  renamed Chicago Night Express
- Louisville Night Express 1914 — 1935
  Chicago, IL — Louisville, KY
  renamed The Kentuckian
- Louisville Special 1904 — 1910
  Chicago, IL — Louisville, KY
  renamed Louisville Daylight Special

== M ==
- Magnolia Limited 1929 — 1930
  New York, NY — Florida via ACL
  renamed Tamiami
- Main Line Express 1893 — 1930
  Pittsburgh, PA — Philadelphia, PA
- The Manhattan 1929 — 1932
  Cleveland, OH — Pittsburgh, PA
  renamed Iron City Express
- Manhattan Limited 1903 — 1971
  New York, NY — Chicago, IL
- The Mariner 1944 — 1947
  Philadelphia, PA — Cape Charles, VA via boat ferry Norfolk, VA
- Memphis Special 1909 — 1941
  New York, NY — Memphis, TN via SOU/N&W/SOU
  renamed The Tennessean
- Mercantile Express 1912 — 1948
  New York, NY — St. Louis, MO
  renamed The Allegheny
- Mercantile Express 1930 — 1933
  Pittsburgh, PA — Chicago, IL
  renamed Progress Limited
- The Metropolitan 1927 — 1932
  New York, NY — Chicago, IL
  renamed Pittsburgh Day Express
- Metropolitan Express 1913 — 1927
  New York, NY — Chicago, IL
  split into The Metropolitan and The Metropolitan Limited
- The Metropolitan Limited 1925 — 1926
  Cincinnati, OH — New York, NY
  renamed The Cincinnati Limited
- The Miamian 1927 — 1962
  New York, NY — Miami, FL via ACL/FEC
- The Mid-City Express 1935 — 1949
  Chicago, IL — Ft. Wayne, IN — Detroit, MI via WAB
- Mid-City Express 1962 — 1978
  Trenton, NJ — Philadelphia, PA Suburban Station
- The Midday Congressional 1956 — 1971
  New York, NY — Washington, DC
- The Midday Keystone 1956 — 1958
  New York, NY — Washington, DC
  renamed The Legislator
- The Midnight Keystone 1956 — 1959
  New York, NY — Washington, DC
- The Mid-South Special 1921 — 1923
  New York, NY — Columbia, SC via SAL/NS
- The Mid-West Express 1910 — 1913
  Washington, DC — Pittsburgh, PA
  renamed Capital Express
- The Mid-Westerner 1935 — 1937
  Pittsburgh, PA — Chicago, IL
  renamed train #37
- Monmouth Express 1920 — 1932
  Philadelphia, PA — Long Branch, NJ via Trenton, NJ
  renamed The Sea Breeze
- Montrealer/Washingtonian 1924 — 1966
  Washington, DC — Montreal, Canada via NYNH&H/B&M/CV
- The Morning Congressional 1952 — 1971
  New York, NY — Washington, DC
- Morning Express 1873 — 1876
  New York, NY — Washington, DC via York, PA
  renamed New York Day Express
- The Morning Keystone 1956 — 1959
  Washington, DC — New York, NY
- The Morning Steeler 1950 — 1957
  Pittsburgh, PA — Cleveland, OH via Salem, OH
- The Mount Pocono Special 1899
  Philadelphia, PA — Tobyhanna, PA
- The Mount Vernon 1933 — 1971
  New York, NY — Washington, DC
- The Mountaineer 1901 — 1934
  Philadelphia, PA — Pottsville, PA — Wilkes-Barre, PA

== N ==
- Nashville Express 1901
  Buffalo, NY — Akron, OH — Columbus, OH — St. Louis, MO / Cincinnati, OH / Nashville, TN via ERIE
  for World's Fair
- Nellie Bly 1926 — 1961
  New York, NY — Atlantic City, NJ via Trenton, NJ and West Haddonfield, NJ
- The New England Express 1920 — 1930
  Philadelphia, PA — Boston, MA
  renamed The New Englander
- The New Englander 1930 — 1961
  Pittsburgh, PA — New York, NY via North Philadelphia, PA
  renamed The Junianta
- The New Southland 1935 — 1938
  Chicago, IL — Ft. Wayne, IN — Ridgeville, IN — Richmond, IN — Cincinnati, OH — Atlanta, GA — Jacksonville, FL
  renamed The Southland
- New York Aiken-Augusta Special 1908 — 1910
  New York, NY — Aiken, SC / Augusta, GA via SOU
  renamed The Southeastern Limited
- New York & Atlanta Express 1901 — 1910
  New York, NY — Atlanta, GA via SOU
- New York & Chicago Limited 1881 — 1887
  New York, NY — Chicago, IL
  renamed Pennsylvania Limited
- New York & Florida Express 1899 — 1902
  New York, NY — Aiken, SC / Augusta, GA — Florida via SOU
- New York & Florida Express 1923 — 1929
  New York, NY — Florida via SAL
  renamed New York-Florida Limited
- New York & Florida Limited 1897 — 1902
  New York, NY — St. Augustine, FL via SOU
  renamed The Southern's Palm Limited
- New York & Florida Short Line Limited 1895 — 1897
  New York, NY — St. Augustine, FL via SOU/FC&P
  renamed New York & Florida Limited
- New York & Florida Special 1888 — 1920
  New York, NY — Jacksonville, FL via ACL
  renamed Florida Special
- New York & Memphis Limited 1902 — 1909
  New York, NY — Memphis, TN via SOU
  renamed Memphis Special
- New York & New Orleans Limited 1907 — 1925
  New York, NY — Atlanta, GA — New Orleans, LA via SOU/L&N
  renamed Crescent Limited
- New York & Norfolk Express 1894 — 1917
  New York, NY — Cape Charles, VA
- New York & Richmond Express 1892 — 1894
  New York, NY — Richmond, VA
  renamed New York & Washington Express
- New York & Southern Express 1888 — 1893
  New York, NY — Washington, DC
  renamed Chesapeake & Ohio Express
- New York & Southern Express 1893 — 1903
  New York, NY — Washington, DC
  split into Southern Railway Express and Atlantic Coast Line Express
- New York & Southern Express 1893 — 1909
  New York, NY — Chicago, IL via Columbus, OH
  renamed Keystone Express
- New York & Washington Fast Express 1890 — 1896
  New York, NY — Washington, DC
  renamed New York & Washington Express
- New York Day Express 1873 — 1880
  Washington, DC — New York, NY
  renamed Washington & New York Express
- New York Day Express 1906 — 1927
  Pittsburgh, PA — New York, NY
  renamed The Juniata
- New York Express 1899 — 1914
  Cape Charles, VA — New York, NY
- New York Express 1904 — 1919
  St. Louis, MO / Chicago, IL — Ft. Wayne, IN — New York, NY
  renamed New York Night Express
- New York Express 1919 — 1928
  Pittsburgh, PA — New York, NY
- New York-Florida Limited 1927 — 1941
  New York, NY — Florida via SAL
  renamed The Palmland
- New York Limited 1924 — 1925
  Florida — New York, NY via ACL
- New York Limited Express/Washington Limited Express 1874 — 1903
  Washington, DC — New York, NY
  renamed New York & Washington Express
- New York Mail 1913 — 1917
  Pittsburgh, PA — Jersey City, NJ
- New York Night Express 1873 — 1892
  Washington, DC — New York, NY
  renamed Washington & New York Express
- New York Night Express 1919 — 1922
  Pittsburgh, PA — New York, NY
- New York-Richmond & Danville Express 1892
  New York, NY — Atlanta, GA — New Orleans, LA
- New York-Richmond Express/Richmond-New York Express 1912 — 1918
  New York, NY — Richmond, VA via RF&P
- New York Special 1903 — 1913
  St. Louis, MO / Cincinnati, OH — Pittsburgh, PA — New York, NY
  split into Iron City Express and Metropolitan Express
- New York-Washington-Atlanta-New Orleans Express 1919 — 1936
  New York, NY — Washington, DC — Atlanta, GA — New Orleans, LA via SOU/A&WP/L&N
- The New Yorker 1930 — 1947
  Chicago, IL — New York, NY
  renamed The Fort Pitt
- The New Yorker 1937 — 1940
  Washington, DC — New York, NY
- The New Yorker 1948 — 1953
  Atlanta, GA — New York, NY via SOU
- News Express 1889 — 1914
  Baltimore, MD / Philadelphia, PA — Lock Haven, PA
  renamed Newspaper Special
- Newspaper Special 1914 — 1934
  New York, NY — Williamsport, PA
- Niagara & Buffalo Express 1900
  Philadelphia, PA — Buffalo, NY
- Niagara 1920 — 1932
  Harrisburg, PA — Williamsport, PA — Ridgway, PA
- Niagara Express 1870 — 1920
  Baltimore, MD / Philadelphia, PA — Emporium, PA — Buffalo, NY
  renamed Niagara
- Norfolk Express 1926 — 1927
  New York, NY — Cape Charles, VA
  renamed The Cavalier
- North Michigan Resorter 1915 — 1918
  Chicago, IL — Kalamazoo, MI — Grand Rapids, MI
  renamed North Michigan Special via MC(NYC)
- North Michigan Special 1918 — 1930
  Chicago, IL — Kalamazoo, MI — Mackinaw City, MI via MC(NYC)
  renamed North Star
- North Star 1930 — 1931
  Chicago, IL — Kalamazoo, MI — Mackinaw City, MI via MC(NYC)
  Name dropped.
- Northern Arrow 1935 — 1961
  Cincinnati, OH — Mackinaw City, MI
- Northern Express 1873 — 1876
  Washington, DC — New York, NY
  renamed Washington, Philadelphia & Boston Night Express
- Northern Express 1892 — 1971
  Washington, DC — Erie, PA / Canandaigua, NY
- The Northland 1923 — 1935
  Cincinnati, OH — Mackinaw City, MI
  renamed Northern Arrow
- Northland Express 1898 — 1903
  Cincinnati, OH — Mackinaw City, MI
  renamed Northland Limited
- Northland Limited 1903 — 1923
  Cincinnati, OH — Mackinaw City, MI
  renamed The Northland
- Northwest Express 1963 — 1978
  Philadelphia, PA Suburban Station — Chestnut Hill, PA

== O ==
- Ohio & Virginia Express 1904 — 1906
  St. Louis, MO — Pittsburgh, PA via Piqua, OH
  renamed Atlantic Express
- Ohio Valley Express 1899 — 1904
  Pittsburgh, PA — Wheeling, WV — Portsmouth, OH — Ironton, OH / Cincinnati, OH via OR/N&W
- The Ohioan 1935 — 1958
  Chicago, IL — Columbus, OH via Bradford, OH
  renamed The Kentuckian
- Oil City Express 1938 — 1950
  Pittsburgh, PA — Oil City, PA
- Old Point Express 1891 — 1926
  Philadelphia, PA — Cape Charles, VA
  renamed Del-Mar-Va Express
- Orange Blossom Special 1925 — 1953
  New York, NY — West Palm Beach, FL via SAL
- Orange Blossom Special (West Coast) 1927 — 1942
  New York, NY — St. Petersburg, FL
- Overnight Express 1913
  Philadelphia, PA — Pittsburgh, PA

== P ==
- Pacific Express 1865 — 1934
  Jersey City, NJ — Chicago, IL via Columbus, OH
- The Palmetto 1943 — 1966
  New York, NY — Savannah, GA via ACL
- Palmetto Limited 1909 — 1943
  New York, NY — Tampa, FL via ACL
  renamed The Palmetto
- The Palmland 1941 — 1971
  New York, NY — Miami, FL / St. Petersburg, FL
- Panama-Pacific Express 1913 — 1915
  New York, NY — Columbus, OH — Chicago, IL
  renamed Pan-Handle Express
- Pan-American Express 1901
  St. Louis, MO / Nashville, TN — Columbus, OH — Akron, OH — Buffalo, NY via ERIE
  for World's Fair
- Pan-Handle Express 1915 — 1935
  New York, NY — Chicago, IL via Columbus, OH
  renamed The Fort Hayes
- Pan-Handle Limited 1912 — 1914
  New York, NY — Chicago, IL via Columbus, OH
- Passenger, Mail & Express 1932 — 1941
  New York, NY — Washington, DC — Jacksonville, FL
- The Patriot 1936 — 1986
  Washington, DC — New York, NY
- The Peach Queen 1947 — 1970
  New York, NY — Atlanta, GA — New Orleans, LA via SOU
- The Pelican 1946 — 1969
  New York, NY — Bristol, VA — Chattanooga, TN — New Orleans, LA via SOU/N&W/SOU
- Peninsula Express 1889 — 1896
  Baltimore, MD — Newark, NJ
- Penn Center Express 1962 — 1978
  Chestnut Hill, PA — Philadelphia, PA Suburban Station
- The Penn Texas 1948 — 1970
  New York, NY — St. Louis, MO connections with MP and MKT
  Renamed.
- Pennsy Aerotrain 1956 — 1957
  New York, NY — Pittsburgh, PA
  experimental run of lightweight GM Aerotrain
- Pennsylvania & Shore Line Day Express 1890 — 1892
  Boston, MA — Philadelphia, PA
  renamed Colonial Express
- The Pennsylvania Limited 1887 — 1971
  New York, NY — Chicago, IL
- Pennsylvania Special 1902 — 1912
  New York, NY — Chicago, IL
  renamed Broadway Limited
- The Pennsylvania-Wilkes Barre Express 1932 — 1949
  Wilkes-Barre, PA — Sunbury, PA — Lock Haven, PA — Altoona, PA
- The Pennsylvanian 1941 — 1949
  New York, NY — Chicago, IL
- Philadelphia & Baltimore Express 1900 — 1902
  Lock Haven, PA — Philadelphia, PA / Baltimore, MD
- Philadelphia & Boston Express 1876 — 1880
  Philadelphia, PA — Boston, MA
- Philadelphia & Washington Express 1900
  Kane, PA — Philadelphia, PA
- Philadelphia Express 1888 — 1904
  Jersey City, NJ — Chicago, IL
  renamed Eastern Express
- Philadelphia Express 1907 — 1916
  Pittsburgh, PA — Philadelphia, PA
  renamed Day Express
- Philadelphia Express 1919 — 1939
  Williamsport, PA — Philadelphia, PA
- Philadelphia Night Express 1909 — 1932
  Pittsburgh, PA — Philadelphia, PA
  renamed The Sea Gull
- Philadelphia Night Express 1932 — 1956
  Pittsburgh, PA — Philadelphia, PA
- Philadelphia Night Express 1958 — 1965
  Harrisburg, PA — Philadelphia, PA
  renamed Chester Countian
- Philadelphia Special 1903 — 1909
  Pittsburgh, PA — Philadelphia, PA
  renamed Philadelphia Night Express
- Philadelphian 1919 — 1930
  Pottsville, PA — Philadelphia, PA
- Philadelphian 1965 — 1972
  Harrisburg, PA — Philadelphia, PA
- Piedmont Limited 1923 — 1967
  New York, NY — Atlanta, GA — Montgomery, AL — New Orleans, LA via SOU/A&WP/L&N
- The Pilgrim 1929 — 1930
  New York, NY — St. Louis, MO
  renamed The St. Louisian
- The Pilgrim 1937 — 1949
  Philadelphia, PA — Boston, MA
- Pittsburgh & Chicago Express 1923 — 1929
  Philadelphia, PA — Pittsburgh, PA — Chicago, IL
  renamed Chicago Express
- Pittsburgh & Northern Express 1907 — 1914
  Philadelphia, PA / Washington, DC — Pittsburgh, PA
- Pittsburgh Day Express 1900 — 1938
  Buffalo, NY — Pittsburgh, PA
- Pittsburgh Day Express 1906 — 1914
  New York, NY — Pittsburgh, PA
- Pittsburgh Day Express 1929 — 1935
  Detroit, MI — Pittsburgh, PA
  renamed The New Yorker
- Pittsburgh Day Express 1932
  New York, NY — Pittsburgh, PA
  renamed The Metropolitan
- Pittsburgh Express 1896 — 1923
  Philadelphia, PA — Pittsburgh, PA
  renamed Pittsburgh & Chicago Express
- Pittsburgh Express 1914
  St. Louis, MO — Pittsburgh, PA
- Pittsburgh Express 1941 — 1942
  Chicago, IL — Pittsburgh, PA
- Pittsburgh Limited 1898 — 1903
  Pittsburgh, PA — New York, NY
  split into New York Special and Pittsburgh Special
- Pittsburgh Night Express 1900 — 1947
  Buffalo, NY — Pittsburgh, PA
- Pittsburgh Night Express 1907 — 1932
  Philadelphia, PA — Pittsburgh, PA
  renamed The Sea Gull
- Pittsburgh Night Express 1918 — 1919
  Chicago, IL — Pittsburgh, PA
  renamed Youngstown-New Castle Express
- Pittsburgh Night Express 1932 — 1964
  Philadelphia, PA — Pittsburgh, PA
- Pittsburgh Special 1900 — 1909
  Chicago, IL / Cleveland, OH / Toledo, OH — Pittsburgh, PA
- Pittsburgh Special 1903 — 1909
  New York, NY — Pittsburgh, PA
  renamed Iron City Express
- Pittsburgh Special 1904 — 1914
  St. Louis, MO — Pittsburgh, PA — New York, NY
  renamed Pittsburgh Express
- Pittsburgh-Wilkes Barre Express 1932 — 1934
  Sunbury, PA — Altoona, PA
  name dropped
- The Pittsburgher 1916 — 1917
  Philadelphia, PA — Pittsburgh, PA
  renamed Altoona Express
- The Pittsburgher 1924 — 1964
  New York, NY — Pittsburgh, PA
- Pocono Limited 1915 — 1930
  Philadelphia, PA — Stroudsburg, PA
- Pocono Mountain Express 1915
  Philadelphia, PA — Tobyhanna, PA
- The Potomac 1929 — 1931
  Washington, DC — Pittsburgh, PA
  renamed The Statesman
- The Potomac 1933 — 1962
  New York, NY — Washington, DC
- The President 1931 — 1971
  New York, NY — Washington, DC
  northbound renamed The Morning Congressional
- The Progress Limited 1933 — 1935
  Pittsburgh, PA — Chicago, IL
  renamed The Mid-Westerner

== Q-R ==
- The Quaker 1920 — 1958
  Boston, MA — Philadelphia, PA
  became NYNH&H-only train
- Quaker City Express 1906 — 1929
  Pittsburgh, PA — Philadelphia, PA
  renamed The New Englander
- Queen Lane Express 1962 — 1963
  Philadelphia, PA Suburban Station — Chestnut Hill, PA
  renamed Northwest Express
- The Rainbow 1929 — 1951
  Chicago, IL — New York, NY
- The Red Arrow 1925 — 1960
  Detroit, MI — Pittsburgh, PA — New York, NY
- The Red Bird 1941 — 1949
  Chicago, IL — Ft. Wayne, IN — Detroit, MI via WAB
- The Red Bird 1952 — 1971
  Chicago, IL — Cincinnati, OH via Logansport, IN
- The Red Knight 1929 — 1930
  New York, NY — Chicago, IL
  renamed The Rainbow
- The Representative 1931 — 1971
  New York, NY — Washington, DC
- Resort Special 1923 — 1928
  Cincinnati, OH — White Sulphur Springs, WV — Hot Springs, VA — Washington, DC — New York, NY via C&O
  renamed West Virginian
- Richmond & Danville Express 1892 — 1894
  New Orleans, LA / Augusta, GA / Memphis, TN — Washington, DC — New York, NY
- Richmond & Danville Limited 1892 — 1894
  Philadelphia, PA — Washington, DC — Atlanta, GA / New Orleans, LA / Asheville, NC / Augusta, GA
- Richmond & New York Express 1892 — 1893
  Richmond, VA — Washington, DC — New York, NY
  renamed Washington & New York Express
- Richmond Express 1873 — 1877
  New York, NY — Washington, DC — Richmond, VA
- Richmond Night Express 1880 — 1894
  Richmond, VA — Washington, DC — New York, NY
  renamed Southern Night Express
- River Valley Express 1919 — 1930
  Philadelphia, PA — Pottsville, PA
- The Robert E. Lee 1935 — 1942
  New York, NY — Washington, DC — Atlanta, GA — Birmingham, AL via SAL
- Rochester & Buffalo Express 1893
  Washington, DC — Buffalo, NY

== S ==
- The Sailor 1944 — 1946
  Norfolk, VA via ferry boat Cape Charles, VA — New York, NY
- The St. Louis & Chicago Express 1920 — 1925
  Pittsburgh, PA — Columbus, OH — St. Louis, MO
- The St. Louis & Cincinnati Express 1891 — 1893
  St. Louis, MO — Cincinnati, OH — Chicago, IL via Columbus, OH
  renamed Chicago & St. Louis Express
- St. Louis & Pittsburgh Special 1908
  St. Louis, MO — Pittsburgh, PA
- St. Louis, Chicago & Cincinnati Express 1889 — 1891
  Jersey City, NJ — Cincinnati, OH — St. Louis, MO / Chicago, IL via Columbus, OH
  renamed The St. Louis & Cincinnati Express
- St. Louis Express 1900 — 1913
  New York, NY — St. Louis, MO
  renamed The Mercantile Express
- St. Louis Express 1912 — 1933
  Pittsburgh, PA — St. Louis, MO via Dayton, OH
- St. Louis Express 1918 — 1920
  Washington, DC — Pittsburgh, PA
- St. Louis Limited 1903 — 1913
  New York, NY — St. Louis, MO
  renamed The Commercial Express
- St. Louis Mail 1913
  New York, NY — St. Louis, MO
- St. Louis Special 1904
  Pittsburgh, PA — St. Louis, MO via Dayton, OH
- The St. Louisan 1913 — 1927
  New York, NY — St. Louis, MO
  renamed The Spirit of St. Louis
- The St. Louisan 1930 — 1959
  New York, NY — St. Louis, MO
  westbound train renamed The Juniata
- The St. Louisan 1930 — 1971
  New York, NY — St. Louis, MO
- Sandusky Fast Line 1909 — 1911 Sunday-only
  Columbus, OH — Sandusky, OH
- Sandusky Special 1903 — 1909
  Columbus, OH — Sandusky, OH
  renamed Sandusky Fast Line
- Saratoga Express 18931896
  Philadelphia, PA — New York, NY — Saratoga, NY via MC(NYC)
- Schuylkill 1920 — 1930
  Hazleton, PA — Philadelphia, PA
- Sea Breeze 1932 — 1942
  Philadelphia, PA — Long Branch, NJ via Trenton, NJ
  name dropped
- The Sea Clipper 1937 — 1942
  New York, NY — Atlantic City, NJ
  name dropped
- Sea Gull 1927 — 1932
  Pittsburgh, PA — Atlantic City, NJ
  split into Pittsburgh Night Express and Philadelphia Night Express
- Sea Plane 1937 — 1942
  New York, NY — Atlantic City, NJ
  name dropped
- Sea-Shore Express 1893 — 1921
  Williamsport, PA — Philadelphia, PA
- Seaboard Express 1903 — 1911
  New York, NY — Jacksonville, FL
  renamed Florida-Cuba Special
- Seaboard Express 1910 — 1935
  Chicago, IL — New York, NY via Columbua, OH
  renamed The Fort Hayes
- Seaboard Fast Mail 1901 — 1903
  New York, NY — Washington, DC — Jacksonville, FL
  renamed Seaboard Mail
- Seaboard Fast Mail 1910 — 1930
  New York, NY — Washington, DC — Jacksonville, FL
  renamed Florida Sunbeam
- Seaboard Fast Mail 1931 — 1932
  New York, NY — Washington, DC — Jacksonville, FL
  renamed Passenger, Mail & Express
- Seaboard Florida Limited 1903 — 1927
  New York, NY — St. Augustine, FL via SAL
  renamed New York-Florida Limited
- Seaboard Florida West Coast Limited 1923 — 1924
  Boston, MA — Tampa, FL / St. Petersburg, FL via SAL
- Seaboard Mail 1903 — 1910
  New York, NY — Washington, DC — Jacksonville, FL via SAL
  renamed Seaboard Fast Mail
- Seashore Limited 1903
  New York, NY — Chicago, IL via Ft. Wayne, IN
  renamed Manhattan Limited
- Second Iron City Express 1920
  Philadelphia, PA — Harrisburg, PA
- The Senator 1929 — 1958
  Boston, MA — New York, NY — Washington, DC
- Silver Comet 1947 — 1968
  New York, NY — Raleigh, NC — Atlanta, GA — Birmingham, AL via SAL
- Silver Meteor 1939 — 1972
  New York, NY — Miami, FL / St. Petersburg, FL
  renamed
- Silver Star 1947 — As of 1996 still operated
  New York, NY — Miami, FL
- The South Wind 1940 — 1969
  Chicago, IL — Indianapolis, IN — Louisville, KY — Miami, FL via L&N/ACL/FEC
- Southeastern Limited 1910 — 1915
  New York, NY — Augusta, GA — Aiken, SC — Jacksonville, FL via SOU
- Southern & Boston Express 1880 — 1892
  Washington, DC — Boston, MA
  renamed Boston Express
- Southern & New York Express 1880 — 1892
  Washington, DC — New York, NY
  renamed Washington & New York Express
- Southern Day Express 1880 — 1892
  New York, NY — Washington, DC
  renamed New York & Washington Express
- Southern Express 1891 — 1896
  New York, NY — Tampa, FL via ACL
  renamed Atlantic Coast Line Express
- Southern Express 1893 — 1971
  Erie, PA / Canandaigua, NY — Washington, DC / Philadelphia, PA
- Southern Express 1904 — 1914
  Chicago, IL — Cincinnati, OH / Louisville, KY
  renamed Louisville Night Express
- Southern Night Express 1880 — 1892
  New York, NY — Washington, DC
  renamed New York & Southern Express
- Southern Night Express 1893 — 1903
  Washington, DC — New York, NY
  renamed Atlantic Coast Line Express
- Southern States Special 1929 — 1941
  New York, NY — St. Petersburg, FL / Birmingham, AL via SAL
  renamed The Sun Queen
- The Southerner 1926 — 1929
  New York, NY — Florida via SAL
  renamed Southern States Special
- The Southerner 1936 — 1940
  Pittsburgh, PA — Washington, DC
- The Southerner 1941 — 1959
  New York, NY — New Orleans, LA via Atlanta, GA and Birmingham, AL
- The Southern's Palm Limited 1902 — 1910
  New York, NY — Charlotte, NC — St. Augustine, FL via SOU
  renamed Southeastern Limited
- The Southland 1915 — 1935
  Chicago, IL — Ft. Wayne, IN — Ridgeville, IN — Richmond, IN — Cincinnati, OH — Atlanta, GA — Jacksonville, FL via L&N/CofG/ACL
  renamed The New Southland
- The Southland 1938 — 1957
  Chicago, IL — Ft. Wayne, IN — Ridgeville, IN — Richmond, IN — Cincinnati, OH — Atlanta, GA — Jacksonville, FL via L&N/CofG/ACL
  renamed The Buckeye
- Southwestern Express 1892 — 1900
  New York, NY / Cincinnati, OH / Louisville, KY / St. Louis, MO / Memphis, TN via Piqua, OH
  renamed St. Louis Express
- The Speaker 1941 — 1952
  New York, NY — Washington, DC
- The Spirit of St. Louis 1927 — 1971
  New York, NY — St. Louis, MO
  renamed
- The Statesman 1931 — 1958
  Washington, DC — Pittsburgh, PA
- The Steel City Express 1915 — 1934
  Chicago, IL — Pittsburgh, PA
- The Steel King 1946 — 1947
  New York, NY — Pittsburgh, PA
- The Steeler 1948 — 1950
  Pittsburgh, PA — Cleveland, OH via Salem, OH and Alliance, OH
  split into The Morning Steeler and The Afternoon Steeler
- The Sun Queen 1941 — 1947
  New York, NY — Miami, FL / St. Petersburg, FL
  renamed The Camillia
- The Surfside 1932
  Washington, DC — New York, NY — Laconia, NH — Plymouth, NH and Rockland, ME via NYNH&H/B&M
- The Susquehannock 1938 — 1960
  Philadelphia, PA — Williamsport, PA

== T-V ==
- The Tamiami 1930 — 1941 spring-fall-only
  New York, NY — Florida via ACL
  split into The Tamiami-Champion (East Coast) and The Tamiami-Champion (West Coast)
- The Tamiami-Champion (East Coast) 1941 — 1943
  New York, NY — Miami, FL via ACL
  renamed The Champion (East Coast)
- The Tamiami-Champion (West Coast) 1941 — 1943
  New York, NY — St. Petersburg, FL via ACL
  renamed Champion (West Coast)
- The Tar Heel 1927 — 1937
  New York, NY — Washington, DC — Wilmington, NC via ACL
  name dropped
- The Tennessean 1941 — 1959
  New York, NY — Memphis, TN via SOU/N&W/SOU
- The Thirty-Seven
  New York, NY — Washington, DC
- The Trail Blazer 1939 — 1959
  New York, NY — Chicago, IL
  name dropped
- The 24-Hour St. Louis 1909 — 1913
  New York, NY — St. Louis, MO
  renamed The St. Louisian
- The Union 1933 — 1971
  Chicago, IL — Cincinnati, OH via Ft. Wayne, IN, and Ridgeville, IN
- United States Fast Mail 1893 — 1919
  New York, NY — Atlanta, GA — New Orleans, LA via SOU
  renamed New York-Washington-Atlanta-New Orleans Express
- The Vacationer 1938 — 1955
  New York, NY — Miami, FL via ACL
- Valley Special 1936 — 1948
  Chicago, IL — Orrville, OH — Alliance Jct., OH — Niles, OH — Youngstown, OH — Pittsburgh, PA
- Vandalia-Toledo Day Express 1913 — 1914
  Toledo, OH — Terre Haute, IN
- Vandalia-Toledo Night Express 1913 — 1914
  Toledo, OH — Terre Haute, IN

== W-Z ==
- Washington & Atlanta Express 1898 — 1901
  New York, NY — Washington, DC — Atlanta, GA / Aiken, SC — Savannah, GA via SOU
  renamed Washington & Florida Limited
- Washington & Atlantic City Express 1903 — 1904
  Washington, DC — Atlantic City, NJ
  renamed Atlantic City Special
- Washington & Boston Night Express 1877 — 1880
  Washington, DC — Boston, MA
  renamed Southern & Boston Express
- Washington & Chattanooga Limited 1899 — 1917
  New York, NY — Washington, DC — Chattanooga, TN via SOU/N&W/SOU
  renamed Washington-Chattanooga-New Orleans Limited
- Washington & Florida Limited 1899 — 1911
  New York, NY — Washington, DC — Charlotte, NC — Florida via SOU/FEC
- Washington & New York Fast Express 1884 — 1893
  Washington, DC — New York, NY
  renamed Atlantic Coast Line Express
- Washington & Philadelphia Express 1906 — 1951
  Buffalo, NY — Philadelphia, PA / Washington, DC
  renamed Washington Express
- Washington & Southwestern Limited 1891 — 1907
  New York, NY — Washington, DC — Atlanta, GA — New Orleans, LA via SOU/L&N
  renamed New York & New Orleans Limited
- Washington Broadway Limited 1923 — 1925
  Washington, DC — Chicago, IL
  renamed Liberty Limited
- Washington-Chattanooga-New Orleans 1931 — 1946
  New York, NY — Bristol, VA — Chattanooga, TN — New Orleans, LA
  renamed The Pelican
- Washington-Chattanooga-New Orleans Limited 1917 — 1931
  New York, NY — Bristol, VA — Chattanooga, TN — New Orleans, LA via SOU/N&W/SOU
  renamed Washington-Chattanooga-New Orleans
- Washington Day Express 1873 — 1880
  New York, NY — Washington, DC
  renamed Southern Day Express
- Washington Day Express 1884 — 1892
  New York, NY — Washington, DC
- Washington Day Express 1906
  Buffalo, NY — Washington, DC
  renamed Washington & Philadelphia Express
- Washington Express 1900 — 1906
  Buffalo, NY — Washington, DC
  renamed Washington Day Express
- Washington Express 1910 — 1912
  Pittsburgh, PA — Washington, DC
  renamed Capital Express
- Washington Express 1918 — 1929
  Pittsburgh, PA — Washington, DC
  renamed The Potomac
- Washington Express 1951 — 1958
  Buffalo, NY — Washington, DC
  renamed Baltimore Day Express
- Washington Night Express 1873 — 1880
  New York, NY — Washington, DC via York, PA
  renamed Southern Night Express
- Washington Night Express 1893
  Buffalo, NY — Washington, DC
- Washington, Philadelphia & Boston Night Express 1876 — 1877
  Washington, DC — Philadelphia, PA — New York, NY — Boston, MA
  renamed Washington & Boston Night Express
- Waterville Express 1932
  Washington, DC — New York, NY — Portland, ME — Waterville, ME via NYNH&H/B&M
- The Weekend Champion 1957
  Miami, FL — New York, NY
- Week-End Special 1906 — 1907 Saturday-only
  Pittsburgh, PA — Erie, PA
- The West Coast Champion 1949 — 1967
  New York, NY — Waycross, GA — St. Petersburg, FL
  renamed The Champion
- West Indian Limited 1925 — 1928
  New York, NY — Jacksonville, FL / west coast of Florida via ACL
- West Virginian 1924 — 1932
  Cincinnati, OH — White Sulphur Springs, WV — Hot Springs, VA — Washington, DC — New York, NY
- The West Virginian 1946
  Pittsburgh, PA — Fairmont, WV via MGH
- Western Express 1888 — 1932
  New York, NY — Pittsburgh, PA — Chicago, IL
- The William Penn 1940 — 1958
  Boston, MA — New York, NY — Philadelphia, PA
- Williamsport & Philadelphia Express 1893 — 1919
  Philadelphia, PA — Williamsport, PA
  renamed Philadelphia Express
- Williamsport Express 1893 — 1923
  Philadelphia, PA — Williamsport, PA
  renamed Lock Haven Express
- Williamsport Express 1933 — 1949
  Philadelphia, PA — Williamsport, PA
- World's Fair Express 1903 — 1904
  Columbus, OH — St. Louis, MO
  renamed World's Fair Special
- World's Fair Special 1904
  Pittsburgh, PA — St. Louis, MO via Dayton, OH
  renamed St. Louis Special
- Youngstown-New Castle Express 1919 — 1920
  Chicago, IL / Cleveland, OH — New Castle, PA — Pittsburgh, PA
  renamed Akron-Cleveland Express
