= 6446 =

6446 may refer to:

- 6-4-4-6, a Whyte notation classification of steam locomotive
- 6446 Lomberg, a minor planet
- The year in the 7th millennium
