= Pennsylvania Railroad class S1 =

Experimental American 6-4-4-6 duplex locomotive

Pennsylvania Railroad S1
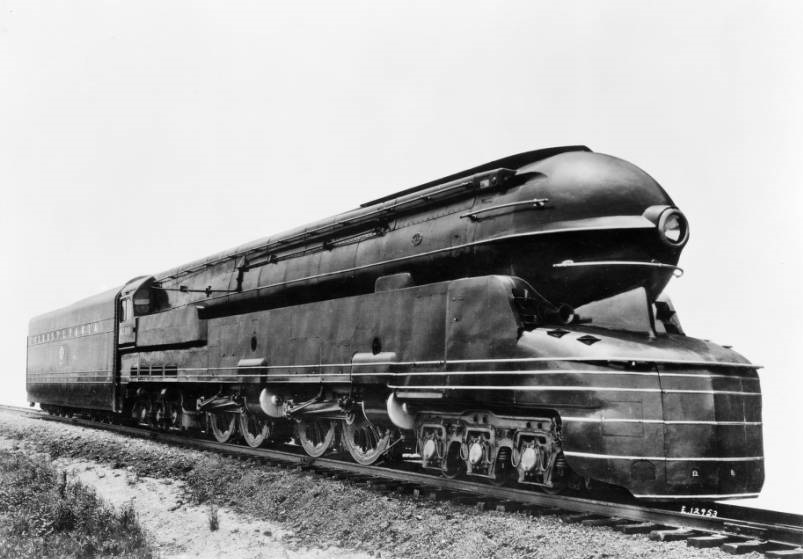
- The official publicity photo of PRR S1 6100 of 1939
Type and origin
- Power type: Steam
- Builder: PRR Altoona Works
- Serial number: Altoona 4341
- Build date: 1939
- Total produced: 1
Specifications
- Configuration
  - Whyte: 6-4-4-6
  - UIC: 3′BB3′h4S
- Gauge: 4 ft 8 1/2 in (1,435 mm)
- Leading dia.: 36 in (914 mm)
- Driver dia.: 84 in (2,134 mm)
- Trailing dia.: 42 in (1,067 mm)
- Wheelbase: Coupled: 26 ft 6 in (8.08 m), Loco: 64 ft 4 in (19.61 m), Loco & tender: 123 ft 9 1/4 in (37.73 m)
- Length: 140 ft 2 1/2 in (42.74 m)
- Width: 10 ft 7 in (3.23 m)
- Height: 16 ft 0 in (4.88 m)
- Adhesive weight: 281,440 lb (127,700 kg; 127.7 t) 1st Driver: 73,800 lb (33,475 kg; 33 t), 2nd Driver: 73,130 lb (33,171 kg; 33 t), 3rd Driver: 66,970 lb (30,377 kg; 30 t), 4th Driver 67,460 lb (30,599 kg; 31 t)
- Loco weight: 608,170 lb (275,861 kilograms; 276 tonnes)
- Tender weight: Empty: 197,020 lb (89,370 kg; 89.37 t); Loaded: 451,840 lb (205,000 kg; 205.0 t)
- Total weight: 1,060,010 lb (480,812 kilograms; 481 tonnes)
- Tender type: 250 P84 16-wheel tender (two 4-axle trucks)
- Fuel type: Coal
- Fuel capacity: 52,900 lb (20,000 kg; 20 t)
- Water cap.: 24,230 US gal (91,700 L; 20,180 imp gal)
- Firebox
  - Grate area: 132 sq ft (12.3 m^{2})
- Boiler: 100 in (2,540 mm)
- Boiler pressure: 300 lbf/in^{2} (2.07 MPa)
- Heating surface
  - Firebox: 660 sq ft (61.3 m^{2})
  - Tubes and flues: 219 tubes (2.25 in), 69 flues (5.5 in).
  - Total surface: 7,746 sq ft (719.6 m^{2})
- Superheater
  - Heating area: 2,085 sq ft (193.7 m^{2})
- Cylinders: Four
- Cylinder size: 22 in × 26 in (559 mm × 660 mm)
- Valve gear: Walschaerts
Performance figures
- Maximum speed: 152 mph (245 km/h) (Claimed); Operating speed ≤ 120 mph (193 km/h)
- Power output: 7,200 hp (5,400 kW) when hauling 1,200 tons train at 100 mph (161 km/h)
- Tractive effort: 76,403 lbf (339.86 kN) (at 85% cut-off) or 71,900 lbf (319.83 kN) (at 70.6% cut-off)
- Factor of adh.: 3.68
Career
- Operators: Pennsylvania Railroad
- Numbers: 6100
- Retired: 1946
- Disposition: Scrapped 1949

The PRR S1 class steam locomotive (nicknamed "The Big Engine") was a single experimental duplex locomotive of the Pennsylvania Railroad. It was designed to demonstrate the advantages of duplex drives espoused by Baldwin Chief Engineer Ralph P. Johnson. The streamlined Art Deco styled shell of the locomotive was designed by Raymond Loewy.

The S1 had a unique 6-4-4-6 wheel arrangement, meaning that it had two pairs of cylinders, each driving two pairs of driving wheels. To achieve stability at fast passenger train speeds (above 100 mph), articulation was not used. The S1 was completed on January 31, 1939, at Altoona shop, and was numbered 6100.

At 140 ft 2 1/2 in (42.74 m) overall, engine and tender, the S1 was the longest reciprocating steam locomotive ever; it also had the heaviest tender (451,840 lb (204.95 t)), highest tractive effort (76,403 lbf (339.86 kN)) of a passenger steam engine when built and the largest driving wheels (7 feet in diameter) ever used on a locomotive with more than three driving axles. The problem of wheel slippage, along with a wheelbase that was too long for many of the rail line's curves, limited the S1's usefulness. No further S1 models were built as focus shifted to the much smaller but more practical class T1 in June 1940. Design of the 4-4-4-4 T1 and the 6-4-4-6 S1 occurred concurrently, however, the S1 was the first produced.

== Construction and historical background ==
Industrial designer Raymond Loewy stands on the front of the S1

As early as June 1936, the management of Pennsylvania Railroad decided to build a new passenger locomotive to replace its aging K4s locomotives. They also hoped that the new S1 steam locomotive would have a performance equal to their Pennsylvania Railroad class GG1 electric engine and would be capable of hauling a 1,000-ton passenger train at 100 mph. A conference was held between Baldwin Locomotive Works officials and W. F. Kiesel, J. V. B. Duer and W. R. Elsey for PRR, where PRR demanded a passenger locomotive to haul 15 standard cars at 100 mph (160 km/h) on level track between Paoli and Chicago. Baldwin presented several 4-8-4 and 4-4-4-4 designs made for other railroads. However, PRR rejected the 4-8-4 design in favor of a rigid frame duplex and asked Baldwin to consider the wheel arrangement 4-4-6-4. In July 1936, PRR requested Baldwin Locomotive Works to submit a design for a 4-8-4 engine capable of handling a 2,000-ton train between Colehour and Harsimus Cove.

Two months after the conference, Baldwin Locomotive Works officials presented four designs to PRR:

- a 4-4-4-4 passenger locomotive that could haul 1,200 tons but exceeded existing weight and clearance restrictions
- a 4-4-4-6 passenger locomotive that could haul 1,200 tons but also exceeded limits
- a 4-8-4 freight locomotive with the same weight on drivers as an M1a, which failed to meet the requirements for a 2,000-ton train
- an articulated 4-6-6-4 locomotive

PRR chose the 4-4-4-4 and asked Baldwin to consider a passenger version with 6 ft 8 in (2.03 m) drivers and a freight version with 6 ft (1.8 m) drivers. However the cooperation between PRR and Baldwin, which proceeded without any official agreement or contract for developing the new duplex engine, didn't go smoothly. Ten months after the first conference (April 1937), PRR ended Baldwin Locomotive Work's consultation and assigned the task to a consortium of Baldwin, American Locomotive Company, and Lima Locomotive Works under a joint contract. T. W. Demarest headed the joint committee, General Superintendent of Motive Power in PRR's Western Region.

The members of the joint committee were:

- Ralph P. Johnsonn (Baldwin)
- William Winterwood
- H. Glaenzer (Baldwin)
- Dan Ennis (American Locomotive Company)
- William E. Woodard (Lima)
- Samuel Allen

On 28 April 1937, PRR's Board authorized $300,000 for this experimental high-speed passenger locomotive project. The design started with a 4-4-4-4 duplex.

On 2 June 1937, PRR officially announced the development of the “Pennsylvania Type” high-speed passenger locomotive which would become Class S1. After various details were discussed and finalized, it became necessary to make changes that substantially increased the locomotive's weight. By the time the plans were finalized and approved it had evolved into a 6-4-4-6.

== Duplex design ==
The benefits of a duplex design included lighter machinery, shorter cylinder stroke, less wear, lower piston thrust, smaller more efficient cylinders, and a more stable frame than an articulated underframe; also, no hinged connection had to be maintained. Reduced hammer blows on the track resulted in lower maintenance cost. Two sets of drivers with four wheels each could have lighter (as much as 25%) running gear than a locomotive with all four axles coupled together, smaller and lighter moving parts ensured less wear and tear. Baldwin's chief engineer believed that the 8-coupled, two-cylinder locomotives of the time were at or near practical limits in terms of steam flow, cylinder efficiency could be improved at high speed by getting the same power from four smaller cylinders with proportionately larger valves. Cylinder valve travel was 7.5 in (190 mm), valve lap was 1.875 in (47.6 mm), valve diameter 12 in (300 mm), the lead was .3125 in (7.9 mm), and the exhaust clearance was .25 in (6.4 mm).

== Construction ==
The S1 under construction at Altoona. The smaller boiler in the photo is for a B6 switcher giving a sense of scale.

The S1 was the largest passenger locomotive ever constructed, and the cast steel locomotive bed plate made by General Steel Castings was the largest single-piece casting ever made for a locomotive. In order to negotiate sharper radius curves, S1 was equipped with lateral motion devices made by Alco on its first and third set of drivers, allowing 57.2 mm (2.25 inches) of lateral play on the axles, but these proved to be inadequate. Unlike other experimental duplex engines like PRR's Class Q1 #6130 4-6-4-4, there were no flangeless wheels or blind drivers adopted on S1.

In March 1938, a Chicago and North Western class E-4 4-6-4 "Hudson" #4003 was tested by PRR at Altoona. Based on the test results, PRR decided to adopt 84" drivers and a cylinder pressure of 300 psi for the S1. PRR believed that the large diameter drivers could increase the tractive effort without causing undue slipping. In August 1941, PRR VP-Western Region James M. Symes, a senior official who turned against the idea of duplex engine in later years, approved the extension of stall no. 30 of the Crestline roundhouse to accommodate the S1. The stall had a connection at the back because the S1 could only be turned on a wye, but not on the roundhouse's turntable.

Timken roller bearings were equipped on the crosshead pins, all engine trucks, and drive axles as well as the tender trucks. Besides, the lightweight reciprocating parts were manufactured by Timken High Dynamic Steel and designed by Timken engineers. To get enough steel between the crank and axle, the back end of each main rod was offset 1 1/8 inches (29 mm) from the crank in the driver, so the big end made a 26-inch (660 mm) circle while each side rod pin made a 28 1/4-inch (718 mm) circle.

== Boiler, steaming quality and streamlining ==
The boiler for the S1 was the largest built by the Pennsylvania Railroad; with 660 square feet (61 m^{2}) of direct heating surface and 500 one-inch diameter tubes, the total heating surface area of S1 was 7,746 square feet (719.6 m^{2}); it was 99.3% as massive as the boiler for Union Pacific's 4000-class "Big Boy" locomotives. In terms of drawbar horsepower, the S1 was 13% more powerful than the Big Boy, with 7,200 hp (5,400 kW) and 6,345 hp (4,731 kW) respectively. The large Belpaire firebox met the Pennsy's standards; its heating surface area included that supplied by seven American Arch circulators. Water passed through 5.5-inch horizontal tube met at the centerline with the other cross tube forming the bottom of the 7-inch vertical tube that sprayed the water up into the steam space above the crown sheet. The lowest set pair of tubes was forward with the side openings of the other six steadily rising toward the back.

A large Worthington 6 SA feedwater heater was fitted with a 7 SA pump to handle the enormous boiler's thirst. The six-wheel leading and trailing trucks were added, as the locomotive was too heavy for four-wheel units. The streamlined Art Deco styled shrouding of the locomotive was designed by Raymond Loewy, a design concept based on his earlier streamlining design for PRR K4s #3768 in 1936, for which he received U.S. Patent No. 2,128,490. Raymond Loewy conducted the wind-tunnel test by using the clay model of S1 at Guggenheim Aeronautical Laboratory for the design of its streamlined shrouding, and it was the same laboratory where he conducted testing of the streamlining of PRR K4s #3768. The design of the smoke lifting plate around the smokestack on S1 was improved based on the wind-tunnel test result from Guggenheim.

== Construction costs and testing ==
The cost of the S1 was $669,780.00, equal to $15,502,683 today, which was over twice the cost of a PRR T1 4-4-4-4 (#6111 cost $310,676). No. 6100 was completed at Altoona on December 21, 1938 without the streamlined casing. On the same day, it made its first road test with two cars, running backward to Huntingdon and returned to Altoona at speeds up to 50 miles per hour (80 km/h). During the run, it was stopped and checked for overhang on all tight curves. Assistant Chief of Motive Power-Locomotive Carleton K. Steins (1891-1973) noted superior riding and steaming qualities. During another pre-service road test, the S1 was clocked at 73 miles per hour (117 km/h) towing 90 freight cars.

== 1939 World's Fair display ==
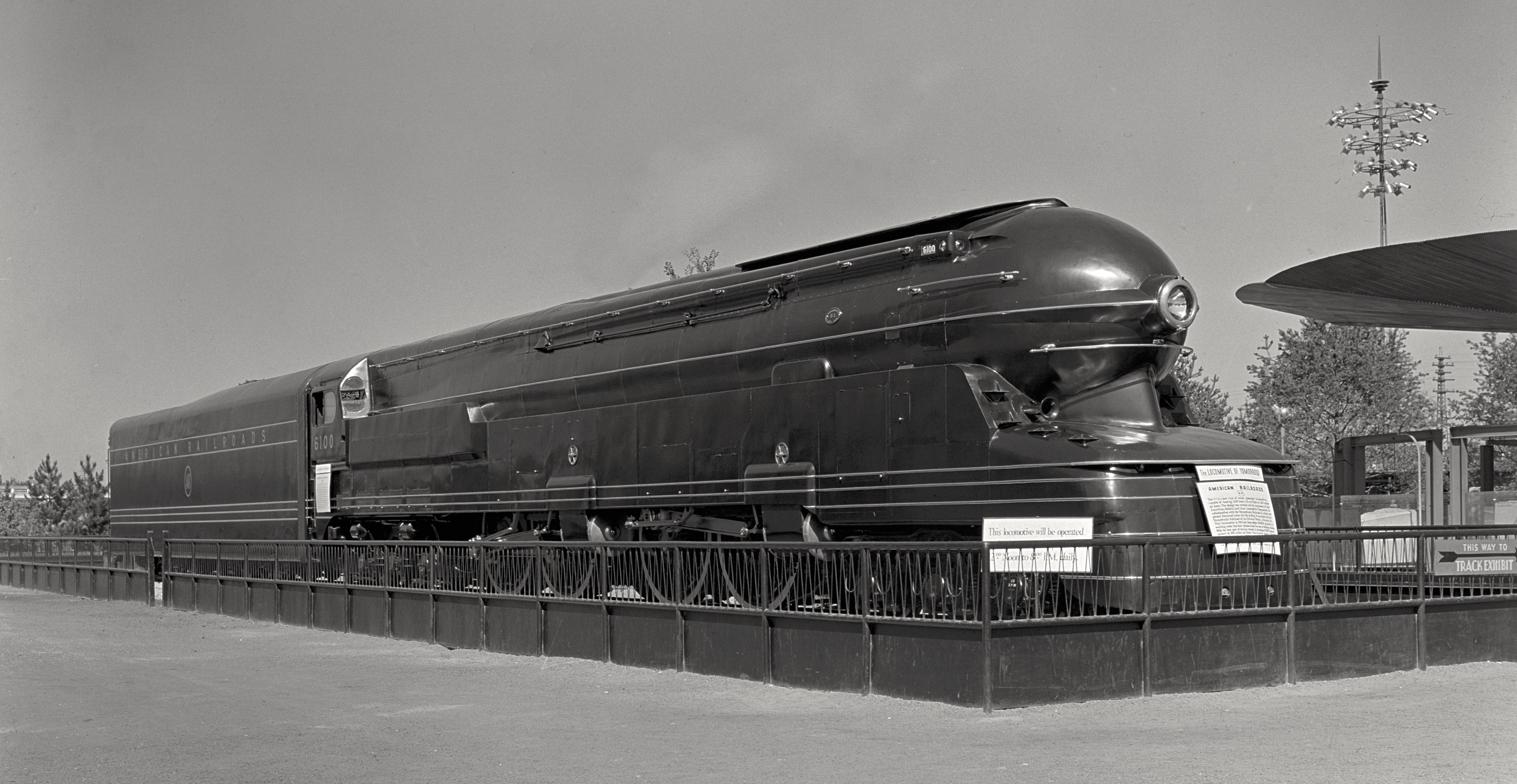
The S1 at the New York World's Fair of 1939

The S1 was displayed at the 1939 New York World's Fair with the lettering "American Railroads" rather than "Pennsylvania Railroad", as 27 eastern railroads had one combined 17-acre (6.9 ha) exhibit, which also included the Baltimore and Ohio class N-1. To reach the Fair, the S1 took a circuitous route over the Long Island Rail Road. Many obstacles, like some of the third rail guards, had to be temporarily removed while other obstacles were passed at a crawl to reach the fairgrounds. S1 was towed (facing backward) by smaller freight engines like PRR Ils and took a round-about route to the fair site. She ran up the Bel-Del, interchanged with the Lehigh and Hudson River Railway at Belvidere and NH at Maybrook. The S1 traveled over the Poughkeepsie and Hell Gate Bridge, crossed over the Hudson River and then brought it across on the NY Connecting. On March 13, 1939, the S1, lettered “American Railroads” on the tender, arrived at New York World's Fair.

At the Fair, the drive wheels operated under the locomotive's steam power ran continuously on the roller platform at 60 mph (97 km/h) for an entire day. Film footage shows that all the wheels on S1, besides the drive wheels, were also placed on rollers powered by electricity; every time S1 started its performance by moving the drive wheels, all the wheels were rolling, including the wheels on the tender's truck.

The World's Fair was open for two seasons, from April to October each year, and was officially closed on October 27, 1940. During the five-month break between October 1939 and April 1940, No. 6100 was put back on the system for passenger service and road testing. There is photo evidence showing that the S1 was hauling the Manhattan Limited, a named train serving as an alternative to the Broadway Limited, in November 1939.

Popular Mechanics described S1 as the "Pride of American Railroad" in an article in their June 1939 issue. The World's Fair attracted nearly 25 million visitors, S1's first 50,000 service mile was accumulated from this fair's live steam show. After the World's Fair, the S1 was re-lettered for the Pennsylvania Railroad fleet. As one of the most important exhibits of the World's Fair, S1 was used by the PRR for various publicity purposes; her image was featured in calendars, stamps, advertisements, brochures, puzzles, etc. The American Bank Note Company issued a series of stamps in 1939, published by the Eaton paper company as part of an advertising campaign. One of the stamps depicts the S1 hauling the Broadway Limited.

== Service history ==
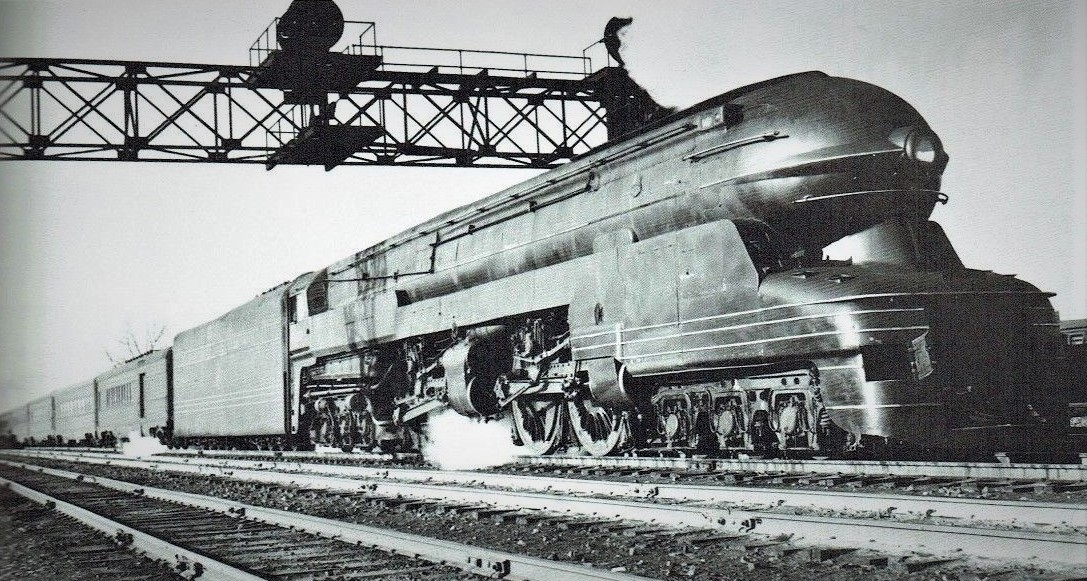
PRR S1 #6100 hauling the Trail Blazer, PRR's premier, luxury all-coach train between New York and Chicago in Nov 1942.

The S1 began its passenger train services starting from December 1940, on the run between Chicago and Pittsburgh. On its first run out of Fort Wayne, Indiana, the crew was led by H.H. Lehman (Fireman), C.J. Wappes (Road Foreman) and Frank Ritcha (Engineer). Due to its gigantic size, the S1 had to turn on the Chicago, Burlington and Quincy Railroad's wye (Y) at Chicago before going eastbound and was unable to go through the 130 lb/yd (64 kg/m) switch (No. 8) just west of Pittsburgh Union Station. This problem wasn't fixed until 1946 (which also prevented the PRR class T1 operating through Pittsburgh).

The S1 was so large that it could not negotiate the track clearances on most of the lines of the PRR system, in its brief service life it was restricted to the 283 mi (455 km) mainline between Chicago, Illinois and Crestline, Ohio. It was assigned to the Fort Wayne Division and based at the Crestline engine-house. As such, the S1 had to be turned on the wye at Crestline whenever it was in town, and suffered from repeated derailments as a result. Based on photographic evidence, the S1 hauled the Broadway Limited (New York to Chicago) and Liberty Limited (Washington D.C. to Chicago) in the first few months of its revenue service, and was then assigned to haul other popular, heavier and commercially successful passenger trains such as the General, Trail Blazer and Golden Arrow on this route.

Monthly mileage reports from the Hagley Library indicated that the S1 racked up 10,388-mile (16,718 km) per month, equivalent to twenty round trips between Chicago, Illinois and Crestline, Ohio, which in Aug 1941 was very remarkable for an experimental engine, compared to K4s' monthly average of 6,000 to 8,000 mi (9,700 to 12,900 km). This implied the PRR had high regard for the S1's power and speed. The S1 helped PRR to handle the extreme busy wartime traffic until the end of WWII and paid off its high construction cost within one year. Crews liked the S1, partly because of its very smooth ride at speed. The locomotive's great mass and inertia combined with the unique 6-wheel trailing truck dampened the bumps and surging often experienced with duplex locomotives.

== Operating performance and alleged speed records ==
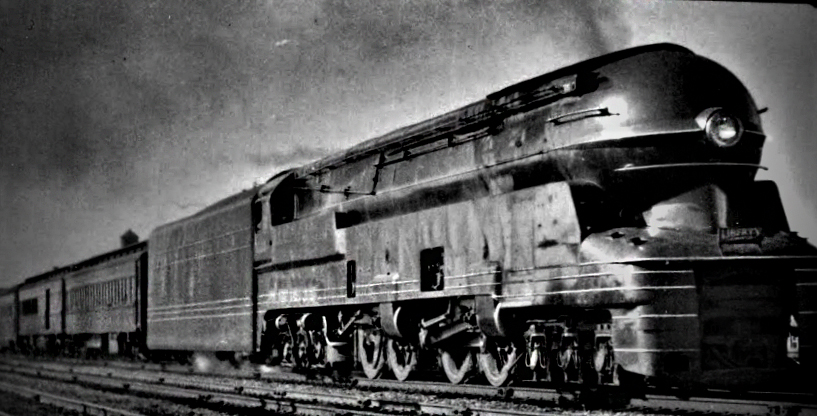
PRR S1 #6100 was seen hauling the Liberty Limited eastbound at New Freedom, PA in April 1941.

In terms of tractive effort and drawbar horsepower, the PRR S1 was the most potent reciprocating steam locomotive ever built for passenger service. Starting tractive effort calculated in the usual way (85% mean effective pressure) comes out 76,400 lbf (340 kN), but the engine used 70.6% limited cutoff (presumably to increase port openings at short cutoff), so the railroad claimed a correspondingly lower tractive effort. During a test run between Chicago, Illinois and Crestline, Ohio in December 1940, the S1 managed to reach 100.97 miles per hour (162.50 km/h) on level track with a 1,350 short tons (1,220 t; 1,210 long tons) passenger train, which was equal to 24 postwar lightweight passenger cars. In this test run, the S1 also achieved an average speed of 66 miles per hour (106 km/h), which was 27% faster than the average schedule speed of the route. Some publications from Germany stated that the S1 was able to reach 120.01 miles per hour (193.14 km/h) in other road tests during the late 1940s when pulling lighter load, but PRR never claimed this record. On April 19, 1941, during an excursion run organized by the Detroit Railroad Club, the S1 reached 105 miles per hour (169 km/h) on the route between Fort Wayne and Chicago.

An article "Riding the Gargantua of the Rails" in the Dec 1941 Popular Mechanics Magazine cites a speed recorded by assistant road foreman Charlie Wappes of the Fort Wayne Division during the S1's test runs at 133.4 miles per hour (214.7 km/h) with a train of 12 heavyweight passenger cars. There are other stories of the S1 reaching or exceeding 140 miles per hour (230 km/h). In the German trade press and literature from 1945 there was a report of a record run of the S1, citing railroad officials of Interstate Commerce Commission that a speed of 141.2 miles per hour (227.2 km/h) was reached when the engine was trying to make up time for a delayed westbound train, the Trail Blazer.

Its high-speed capability was such that many have claimed that the S1 exceeded on multiple occasions the 126 mph (203 km/h) record steam locomotive speed set in 1938 by the British LNER locomotive 4468 Mallard. The engine was claimed to have exceeded 152 mph (245 km/h) on the Fort Wayne-Chicago run, as it was reported that the PRR received a fine for the feat.

The streamlining designer of the train Raymond Loewy himself wrote in 1979: "On a straight stretch of track without any curves for miles; I waited for the S1 to pass through at full speed. I stood on the platform and saw it coming from the distance at 120 miles per hour. It flashed by like a steel thunderbolt, the ground shaking under me, in a blast of air that almost sucked me into its whirlwind. Approximately a million pounds of locomotive were crashing through near me. I felt shaken and overwhelmed by an unforgettable feeling of power, by a sense of pride at the sight of what I had helped to create."

== Suspected design flaws ==
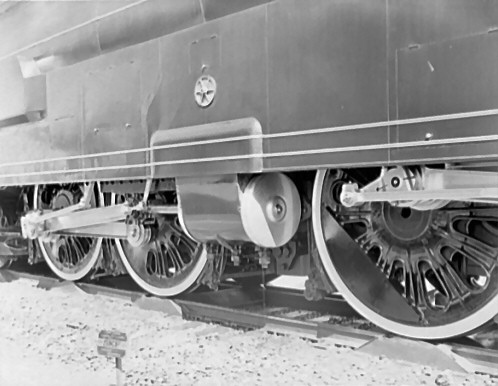
Detail view of the driving wheels and cylinders; note the rollers upon which the wheels rested while on display

The lack of curve compatibility led to the S1 not being used for its intended long-distance express service. Although the S1 had less than half (47%) its total weight on the driving wheels, its Factor of adhesion was still close to the much more successful PRR Q2, Santa Fe "Northern" 4-8-4s the 2900s, and the renowned N&W J class 4-8-4s. More than half of its weight was carried by the three-axle pilot (leading) and trailing trucks instead of the drivers, which left the four duplex driving axles susceptible to wheel slippage. However, during the 5 1/2 years service history of the S1, no serious accident occurred due to wheel slippage. The S1 served between Chicago and Crestline, Ohio for almost 5 1/2 years, giving it a longer career than other experimental PRR steam locomotives, such as the Q1 4-6-4-4 and S2 turbine 6-8-6.

== Mitigation measures ==
To increase the adhesion and improve performance, PRR enlarged the sand dome on the S1. It ensured the supply of sand for steam sanding and slightly increased the axle load above the first and second set axle. The S1 was partially de-skirted in 1942 to improve the visibility of the reciprocating parts for the crews and better operation. Suspension springs of the pilot truck and trailer truck were fine-tuned to straighten out the overall weight distribution to achieve better performance. Railway Historian and Author Alvin F. Staufer agrees that she (S1) was oversized and thus unable to visit most roundhouses or handle tight curves, but contends: "She was an excellent steamer and gave trouble-free service."

== Retirement ==
Based on the experience gained from the S1, PRR improved the design of the T1. A total of 52 of them were ordered from 1940 to 1945.

According to an official report from PRR dated December 1, 1945, which is now stored in The Hagley Museum and Library, No. 6100 was awaiting engine truck repairs at Crestline. It was expected to be returned in service after a few days. This is one solid proof that the S1 was still in service at least until December 1945. At the time, at least 13 T1 4-4-4-4s were already put into service.

The design flaws of the S1 led to only one example being produced. Before the S1 was officially put in revenue service, the PRR already ordered the T1s. Unlike its duplex sisters, the S1 didn't install any form of Poppet Valve Gear, even though it was proposed to install Franklin Type A rotary cam poppet valve gear when it was already under construction, but such proposal was rejected due to technical difficulties in 1938. This decision unexpectedly prevented many issues that would have been caused by the problematic Franklin valves in the T1's service. The total service years or total service mileage of the S1 (from Nov 1939 to March 1940, Dec 1940 to May 1946) was indeed slightly longer than some of the younger T1s.

A time-book belonging to Pennsy engineman Byron Breininger from the Ft. Wayne division records a trip to Chicago on No. 6100 at 8:59 AM on May 5, 1946. This run was possibly one of its last in service, as less than two years later PRR president Martin W. Clement announced that “by May of this year (1948) we expect all of our through passenger trains west of the electrified territory to be dieselized”. Preservation of the S1 was discussed inside PRR's board, but due to the deteriorating financial situation since 1946, 6100 was scrapped in 1949. The PRR continued developing the T1 class of 4-4-4-4 duplex locomotives but wheel slip and mechanical failures also plagued the T1.

Before Pennsylvania Railroad commissioned Baldwin Locomotive Works for the T1 in 1940, it had already begun developing duplex designs for fast locomotives since 1938, including a rigid-frame 4-2-2-4 and three-cylinder 4-4-4 for lightweight trains and the preliminary design for a 4-4-4-4 for heavy trains; BLW presented these designs to several railroads, but only the PRR adopted the duplex concept. In Oct 1939, when the S1 was still on display in the 1939-40 World's Fair, Baldwin placed a stock order to build a 4-4-4-4 duplex high-speed passenger locomotive as a demonstrator, with bullet nose streamlining by noted industrial designer Otto Kuhler. However before it could be built, the PRR placed an order for two locomotives of this type in July 1940. This implied that the S1 was a showpiece exclusively built for the World's Fair instead of replacing the K4s as the new prime power of the PRR. The PRR T1 was developed when the S1 was under construction or on display in the World Fair.

== Cultural references ==
The stylish appearance of the S1 has proved to be very popular:

- The S1 was represented in a 1939 painting by railroad artist Grif Teller that appeared in the Pennsylvania Railroad's picture calendar.
- The American Bank Note Company issued a series of posters published by the Eaton paper company as part of an advertising campaign in 1939, one of the posters depicts the S1 hauling the Broadway Limited.
- Famed artist Emmanuel Zurin's Bronze sculpture Train futuriste, a 43 inches long sculpture which features some elements of S1's front-end styling like the bullet head, lines, and curves at the pilot and its 6-wheel trucks.
- A painting of the S1 is used as the album cover for the compilation album Night Train, Classic Railroad Songs, Volume 3, published by Rounder in 1998.
- Compilation album Black Diamond Express to Hell, published by Rev. A. W. Nix in 2006, features a perspective drawing of the S1 which was used as the backbone of the cover's art design.
- In the PC game Gadget: Invention, Travel, & Adventure, one of the trains the player travels on is pulled by an S1 modeled locomotive, which also appears on the cover art.
- The Danish pop group 'Laid Back's third album Play It Straight, released in 1985, features a three-quarter view of the S1's bow on its cover, albeit in a red hue it never wore in service.
- The S1 appears in the Sandman comic series, book IX.
- In The Galaxy Railways, the engine for Vega Platoon, Iron Burger, is loosely based on the S1, with the 4-8-8-4 wheel arrangement used for the Union Pacific Big Boy, which was used as the basis for Big One, the engine for Sirius Platoon.
- A locomotive inspired by the S1, minus the tender, appears in the PC game Grim Fandango as "the Number Nine," the best vehicle for travel to the eternal rest.
- Solomon Islands Stamps released a set of stamps in 2017 (Neofile #SI-17212a) with the S1 and other express steam locomotives from all over the world, such as the LNER A4 Mallard.
- A streamlined locomotive similar to the S1 appears in Batman: The Animated Series season 1, episode 2, Christmas with the Joker.
- Aunt Billie's "toy trains" in the 2007 film Meet the Robinsons are loosely based on this particular locomotive design.
- Engine Engine No. 9, a 34-page children’s chapter book by Edith Thacher Hurd, illustrated by Clement Hurd, published in 1940 by Lothrop, Lee & Shepard Co. of Boston, has as its main character an anthropomorphic steam locomotive. Clement Hurd’s illustrations show No. 9 to be nearly identical to a PRR class S1, except for its 4-6-2 “Pacific” wheel arrangement, making No. 9 considerably shorter than a 6-4-4-6 PRR class S1.
- Paramount’s 1941 Technicolor Superman cartoon by Max and Dave Fleischer, Billion Dollar Limited, stars a steam locomotive with the same Art Deco streamlining as a PRR class S1, except for a 4-8-4 wheel arrangement instead of the S1’s 6-4-4-6 arrangement.
- There are Lionel and MTH models of 6100.
- The locomotive has appeared in train games like Trainz and Train Simulator Classic.

== See also ==
- Pennsylvania Railroad locomotive classification
