= Trail Blazer (train) =

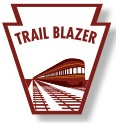
- The keystone plate of the Trail Blazer

Overview
- Predecessor: The General
- First service: July 28, 1939
- Last service: July 26, 1959
- Successor: General
- Former operator(s): Pennsylvania Railroad (1939–1959)

Route
- Stops: 1. New York, NY (Pennsylvania Station) (ET); 2. Newark, NJ; 3. Trenton, NJ; 4. Philadelphia, PA (North Philadelphia Station); 5. Paoli, PA; 6. Lancaster, PA; 7. Harrisburg, PA; 8. Altoona, PA; 9. Pittsburgh, PA; 10. Canton, OH; 11. Mansfield, OH; 12. Crestline, OH; 13. Lima, OH (ET); 14. Fort Wayne, IN (CT); 15. Plymouth, IN; 16. Gary, IN; 17. Englewood, IL (Union Station); 18. Chicago, IL (Union Station) (CT)
- Distance travelled: 907.7 miles (1,460.8 km)
- Average journey time: 17 hours
- Service frequency: Daily
- Train number(s): 76 (Chicago to New York; 77 (New York to Chicago)

On-board services
- Seating arrangements: 644 (14-car consist, incl. 72 Lounge seat)
- Catering facilities: Twins-Unit Dining Car
- Observation facilities: Lounge observation car
- Entertainment facilities: Radio broadcast, magazines and beverages
- Baggage facilities: Combine Baggage car provided
- Other facilities: Extra lounge car at the front-end

Technical
- Operating speed: 53.4 mph (86 km/h)

The Trail Blazer was a deluxe all-coach train, inaugurated between New York and Chicago via Pittsburgh, Pennsylvania on 17:25 schedule operated by the Pennsylvania Railroad. The trains departed New York City and Chicago every day at 4:30 pm and 3:00 pm, respectively, and arrived at the destination the next morning. The Trail Blazer was one of the first all-coach trains (along with the Santa Fe's El Capitan) to provide premium services comparable to a Pullman train. The Trail Blazer name was first used in 1927 for the East St. Louis-Pittsburgh preferred freight VL-6.

Two days before service began, the Trail Blazer equipment, including streamlined P70's, twin-unit diner, and observation designed by Raymond Loewy, were exhibited at Penn Station, made press runs to Philadelphia, and returned to New York on July 28 after display at Philadelphia. On July 28, 1939, service officially began, and was an immediate success. On July 29, 1939, the first eastbound Trail Blazer arrived at New York World's Fair for a special ceremony. Eastbound trips continued to run direct to the Fair.

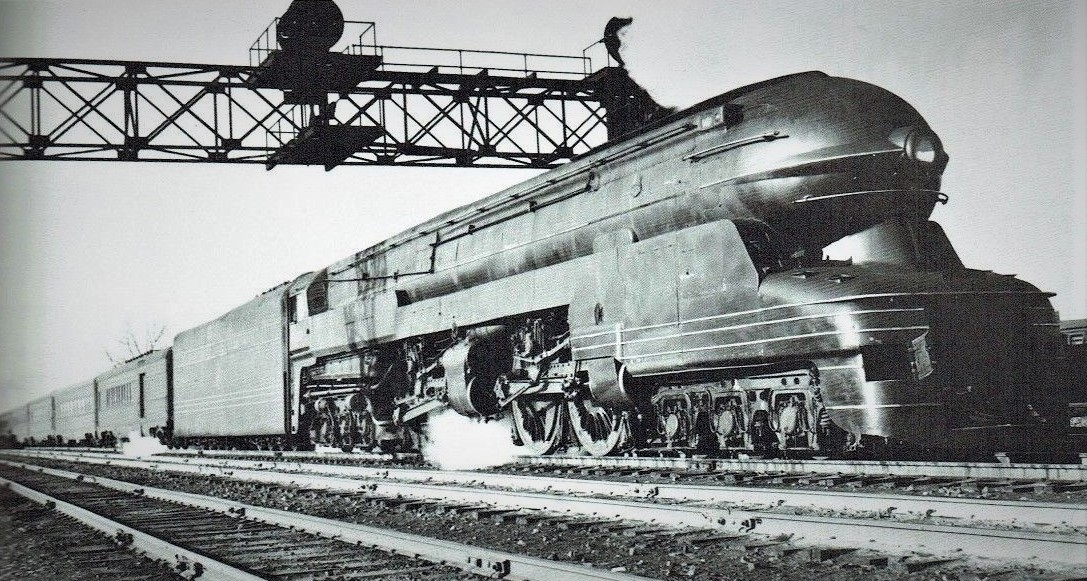
PRR S1 #6100 hauling the Trail Blazer, PRR's premier, luxury all-coach train between New York and Chicago in Nov., 1942.

According to LIFE magazine, reservations were made as far as six weeks in advance during the first month of service. The PRR felt very pleased with the performance of this new coach-only train. Instead of the eight-car consist originally planned, the train had to carry an average of ten. The number of passengers on the Trail Blazer frequently exceeded those of Pennsylvania's better-known train, the Broadway Limited and PRR's rival, New York Central's coach-only Pacemaker. New York Central's Pacemaker offered identical service and schedule but with ordinary heavyweight equipment inaugurated on same day. The Trail Blazer carried about 132,000 passengers in the first year and 175,000 in the second. In 1940-41 it sometimes operated in second and third sections.

Historical photographic and films evidences showing that PRR S1 #6100 "The Big Engine" was the preferred engine of this popular, highly profitable (It carried 35 times more passengers than Broadway Limited in 1939, gross revenue equal to $2,260,000 in 1940 or $50,723,848 in 2024). The Trail Blazer was one of the longest and heaviest passenger train (more than 1000 tons) during the heyday of PRR's passenger services in the early 40s. Besides PRR S1 #6100, streamlined K4s, PRR S2 direct-drive steam turbine engine #6200, and PRR T1 were assigned to haul the train occasionally.

In 1948, PRR re-equipped the Trail Blazer with new EMD E8 Diesel engines, new lightweight P85b 44-seat coaches and new twin-unit dining car built by PRR's own shop and ACF. In 1949, the westbound schedule shortened to 15 hours 40 mins. Due to rapidly declining demand, the Pennsylvania Railroad combined the Trail Blazer and General into one service. However, their timetable continued to distinguish the two trains until July 26, 1959, when PRR removed the name Trail Blazer

== Standard Consist in 1943 ==
According to the PRR's roster on November 26, 1943, the consist of Train #77 The Trailblazer had 14 rebuilt heavyweight passenger cars with streamlined features in total which including one PB70ER passenger baggage car, nine P70KR 56-seat coaches, one D70CR Kitchen Dormitory car with 18 berths for the staff and a D70DR full Dining car with Polaroid windows installed, one P70GSR 68-seat coach, and one POC70R coach-observation.

Location: Chicago, Illinois, USA Train Number: 76 The Trail Blazer, Westbound, Depart at 3pm

Destination: New York City, arrive at 9:25am

- PRR S1 #6100 6-4-4-6 Duplex Steam Engine or PRR K4s Double Headed
- PB70ER Baggage Lounge Car (25 lounge seats)
- P70KR Reclining Seat Coach (56 seats)
- P70KR Reclining Seat Coach (56 seats)
- P70KR Reclining Seat Coach (56 seats)
- P70KR Reclining Seat Coach (56 seats)
- P70KR Reclining Seat Coach (56 seats)
- D70CR Full Dining Car (60 seats, 18 tables)
- D70DR Kitchen Dormitory (18 berths)
- P70KR Reclining Seat Coach (56 seats)
- P70KR Reclining Seat Coach (56 seats)
- P70KR Reclining Seat Coach (56 seats)
- P70KR Reclining Seat Coach (56 seats)
- P70GSR Reclining Seat Coach (68 seats)
- POC70R Observation-Lounge Car (31 lounge seats, 16 dining seats, 4 tables)

Consist weight (minus locomotive): 2,124,700 lb (1,062 short tons)

== Motive Power ==
Here is a list of motive power used on the Trail Blazer:

- PRR GG1 4-6-0+0-6-4 electric locomotive (1939-1959, East of Harrisburg, electrified region)
- PRR K4s 4-6-2 type steam locomotive (1939-1948)
- PRR S1 6-4-4-6 type steam locomotive (1941-1946)
- PRR S2 6-8-6 type steam turbine locomotive (1944-1948)
- PRR T1 4-4-4-4 type steam locomotive (1942-1948)
- ALCO PA passenger diesel electric locomotive (1948-1952)
- BLW DR-6 passenger diesel electric locomotive (1948-1952)
- BLW DR-12 passenger diesel electric locomotive (1948-1952)
- EMD E8 passenger diesel electric locomotive (1948-1959)
