= Pennsylvania Railroad class S2 =

American steam turbine locomotive

Pennsylvania Railroad S2 class
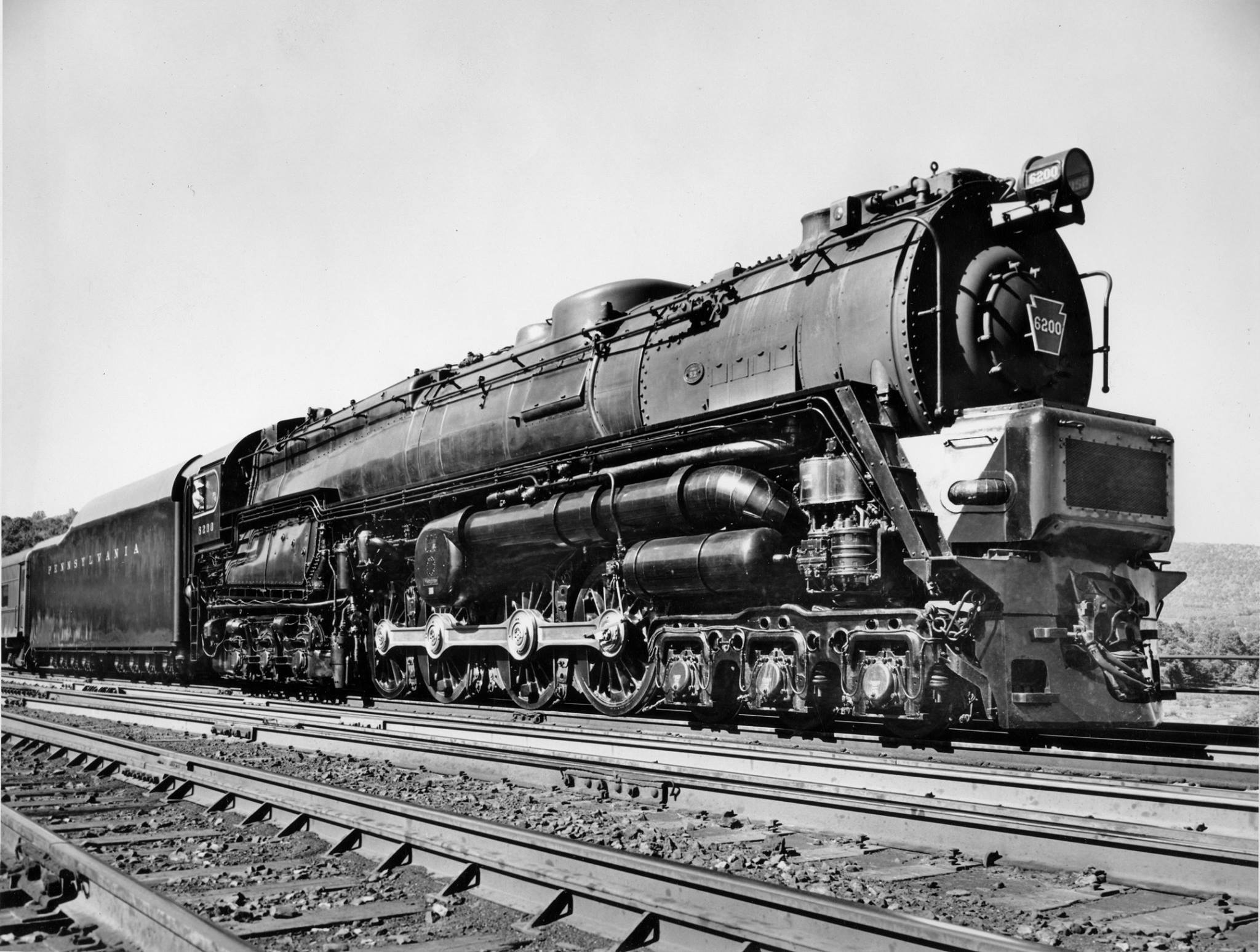
- PRR 6200 at Baldwin Locomotive Works c. 1944 (PRR promotional image)
Type and origin
- Power type: Steam turbine
- Builder: Baldwin Locomotive Works, Westinghouse Electric & Manufacturing Company
- Order number: 70900
- Serial number: 6200
- Build date: 1944
- Total produced: 1
Specifications
- Configuration
  - Whyte: 6-8-6
  - UIC: 3D3
- Gauge: 4 ft 8 1/2 in (1,435 mm) standard gauge
- Leading dia.: 36 in (914 mm)
- Driver dia.: 68 in (1,727 mm)
- Trailing dia.: 42 in (1,067 mm)
- Wheelbase: 108 ft (32.92 m)
- Length: 122 ft 7 1/4 in (37.37 m)
- Height: 16 ft (4,877 mm)
- Adhesive weight: 271,450 lb (123 tonnes)
- Loco weight: 589,920 lb (268 tonnes)
- Tender weight: 442,180 lb (201 tonnes)
- Total weight: 1,032,100 lb (468 tonnes)
- Tender type: 180-P-85 16-wheel tender (two 4-axle trucks)
- Fuel type: Bituminous coal
- Water cap.: 19,500 US gal (74,000 L)
- Tender cap.: 37.5 t (41.3 short tons)
- Firebox
  - Grate area: 120 sq ft (11 m^{2})
- Boiler: Modified Belpaire type 102 in (2,591 mm) diameter (back)
- Boiler pressure: 310 psi (2.1 MPa)
- Feedwater heater: Worthington Corporation
- Heating surface
  - Tubes: 18 ft (5,486 mm)
- Superheater
  - Type: Worthington Type E single-loop
  - Heating area: 2,050 sq ft (190 m^{2})
- Transmission: Direct geared turbine
Performance figures
- Maximum speed: At least 110 mph (177 km/h)
- Power output: Forward turbine - 6,900 hp (5,150 kW), reverse turbine - 1,500 hp (1,120 kW)
- Tractive effort: 65,000 lbf (289.13 kN)
Career
- Operators: Pennsylvania Railroad
- Class: S2
- Number in class: 1
- Numbers: 6200
- Nicknames: "The Big Whoosh"
- Delivered: November 28, 1944
- First run: March 26, 1945
- Last run: June 11, 1949
- Withdrawn: August 1949
- Disposition: Scrapped May 29, 1952

The Pennsylvania Railroad's S2 class was a one-off experimental prototype steam turbine locomotive designed and built in a collaborative effort by Baldwin Locomotive Works and Westinghouse Electric & Manufacturing Company, as an attempt to prolong the dominance of the steam locomotive by adapting technology that had been widely accepted in the marine industry. One was built, #6200, delivered in September 1944. The S2 was the sole example of the 6-8-6 wheel arrangement in the Whyte notation, with a six-wheel leading truck keeping the locomotive stable at speed, eight powered and coupled driving wheels, and a six-wheel trailing truck supporting the large firebox. The S2 used a direct-drive steam turbine provided by the Westinghouse Electric & Manufacturing Company, geared to the center pair of axles with the outer two axles connected by side rods; the fixed gear ratio was 18.5:1. Such design was to prevent energy loss and S2 achieved a mechanical efficiency of 97% which means only 3% of steam energy was lost within the propulsion equipment. The disadvantage of a direct-drive steam turbine was that the turbine could not operate at optimal speeds over the locomotive's entire speed range. The S2 was the largest, heaviest and fastest direct-drive turbine locomotive design ever built.

== Design specification ==
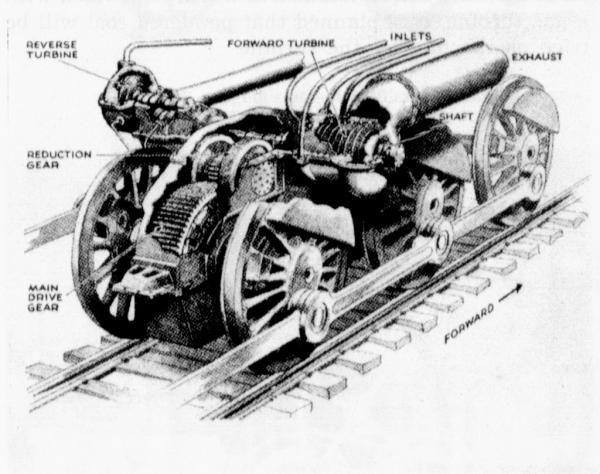
A diagram showing how the turbine works on PRR S2

The locomotive was to be a 4-8-4, but wartime restrictions on light steel alloys increased weight until six-wheel leading and trailing trucks were needed; its construction was also delayed by World War II. Construction of the locomotive took place at the Baldwin plant in Eddystone. Two turbines were fitted, one for forward travel and a smaller one for reversing at speeds up to 22 mph (35 km/h). Superheated steam at a rate of about 2,000 pounds per hour was directed onto the turbine blades through 4 nozzles; thousands of turbine blades transmitted steam energy to the transmission gear. The maximum rotation speed of the forward turbine is 9,000 rpm, developing 6,900 hp; the reverse turbine generates 1,500 hp at 8,300 rpm. A monitoring system ensured that the forward turbine could only be started when the reverse turbine was switched off. Weight of propulsion equipment was 39,000 lbs., or 5.65 lbs/hp. A large boiler with a Belpaire firebox and long combustion chamber was fitted. An automatic lubrication system was installed, connecting the transmission case, where the driving gear wheels were immersed in a lubricant reservoir filled with lubricating oil. Lubricant goes through all lubrication points, including roller bearings on all axles via the filtered pipes with the help of two steam pumps. A Worthington-pattern feedwater heater was fitted for increased efficiency. Twin air pumps for train braking were fitted below the running boards beside the smokebox front, and a large radiator assembly at the nose cooled the compressed air.

The turbine exhaust was piped through a set of four nozzles in the smokebox, providing an even draft for the fire and exiting through a unique quadruple stack. S2 had no smoke deflector when it was delivered from Baldwin to PRR in September 1944, but, soon after it began its service, PRR found out that the locomotive blew heavy smoke at lower speed during operation. So, a pair of small smoke deflectors was acquired and a thin semi-circular metal plate for smoke lifting was filled a few feet behind the smokestack. Apparently, these weren't adequate, so a much-larger pair which look like the "elephant ears" used on New York Central class S1b 4-8-4 Niagara and Union Pacific FEF-3 4-8-4 was added at Altoona Works in December, 1946. Using a smoke deflector was never a tradition of the Pennsylvania Railroad. Prior to S2 #6200, there were only three K4s-installed smoke deflectors between 1939 and 1941, for an experimental purpose: PRR #5038, #3876 and #3878. Their smoke deflectors were all removed after the war, so the steam turbine #6200 was the only Pennsy locomotive with huge "elephant ears" after the war.

The tender of the PRR S2 #6200 was originally made for a class L1s locomotive with the designation 180-F-82. Later, it was assigned as 180-P-75 for class K4s No. 3768; the tender was rebuilt again and received the designation 180-P-85 for S2 6200 use. This large 16-wheel tender was similar to that used on the PRR's other large passenger locomotives, the T1 and S1. In order to reduce the crew's workload, a "Fluid Pressure Control System" (U.S. patent 2,515,962) designed by Westinghouse engineer Harry C. May was installed on the locomotive. It controlled starting, running, reversing, power output, and speed, and limited speed in both directions of operation, all in one single control lever which was installed in front of the engineer's seat.

The locomotive proved to be powerful and capable, with reserves of power at speed and reasonable fuel economy. The turbine drive was easy on the track and allowed more power at the rail. During a test run officially arranged by PRR on 30 March 1945, S2 #6200 towing a dynamometer car was able to pull a 17-car train over a distance of 48 kilometers (level track) at a speed of 110 mph (180 km/h) between Fort Wayne and Chicago. Engineer Mr. Flaya Cartwright and Fireman Mr. M.E. Brown were assigned to this official test run. E.S. Cox, a British locomotive engineer, once traveled on the footplate and reported that "100mph was maintained and exceeded for 12 consecutive minutes". While economical at speed, the locomotive was highly-uneconomical at lower speed. The turbine used less steam than conventional locomotives above 30 mph (48 km/h), but below that the locomotive used too much steam and fuel. The boiler normally operated at 310 psi (2.1 MPa), but at low speed the pressure could drop as low as 85 psi (0.59 MPa). The increased fuel usage at low speeds caused the firebox to run hotter, which sometimes caused stay bolts to break.

The locomotive's problems, the rapid decline of PRR's ridership since 1947 and the advantages of the emerging diesel locomotive ensured that #6200 would never be duplicated, but S2 still participated in the 1948 Chicago Railroad Fair with a T1 4-4-4-4 Duplex Steam Locomotive. In August 1949, the locomotive suffered severe turbine damage. Since the maintenance costs rose steadily, the S2 was finally stored in Crestline and Altoona. In 1952, she was finally retired and was scrapped the following year.

== Wheel arrangement ==
The design is the only known example of the 6-8-6 wheel arrangement.

Under the Whyte notation for the classification of steam locomotives by wheel arrangement, 6-8-6 represents the arrangement of six unpowered leading wheels, eight powered and coupled driving wheels, and six unpowered trailing wheels.

Other equivalent classifications are:

- UIC classification: 3D3 (also known as German classification and Italian classification)
- French classification: 343
- Turkish classification: 410
- Swiss classification: 4/10.

== Service history ==
The S2 was assigned to the Fort Wayne Division and based at the Crestline enginehouse. It hauled various prestigious passenger trains serving the New York to Chicago corridor such as The Broadway Limited, The Liberty Limited, The Trail Blazer, The General, The Manhattan Limited and The Golden Arrow on the route between Chicago and Crestline, Ohio (283 miles/ 446 km). S2 also hauled troop trains and was seen towing express freight trains. PRR S2 #6200, as an experimental prototype of a direct-drive steam turbine locomotive, ran 103,000 miles in total before it was completely withdrawn from service in August, 1949 and would soon await the scrapper's torch. The 6200 was eventually scrapped in Conway, Pennsylvania.

== In popular culture ==
Lionel, the model train builder, made several models of the S2. The first ones, 671 and 2020, were made from 1946 until 1949; the latter was made to run on the tighter curves of the company's O27 track, but was not successful. The improved 681 was sold in 1950 and 1951 with Lionel's Magne-Traction feature which increases traction by magnetizing the driving wheels -- the O27 version was dropped. In 1952 there was a shortage of magnetic material, due to the Korean War, so the 671 was reissued as the 671rr (671 rerun). The 681 returned with Magne-Traction in 1953. In 1954 and 1955 a further modification, numbered 682, was offered with a valve gear on the wheels and a white stripe painted on both sides.

== See also ==
- LMS Turbomotive
- Ljungström locomotives
