= Manhattan Limited =

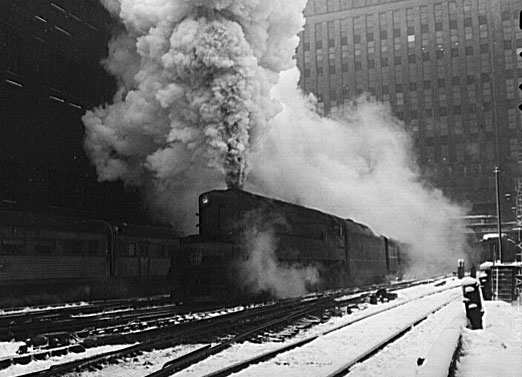
- A T1 prototype leaves Chicago's Union Station in February 1943 with the Manhattan Limited to New York.

Overview
- Service type: Inter-city rail
- Status: discontinued
- Locale: Midwestern United States/Mid-Atlantic States
- First service: 1903
- Last service: 1971
- Former operator(s): Pennsylvania Railroad; 1968–1971: Penn Central

Route
- Termini: New York, New York; Chicago, Illinois
- Distance travelled: 907.7 miles (1,460.8 km) Chicago-New York
- Service frequency: Daily
- Train number(s): 22 (eastbound); 23 (westbound)

On-board services
- Seating arrangements: coaches (1955)
- Sleeping arrangements: Sleeping cars: Roomettes, duplex rooms, double bedrooms (1955)
- Catering facilities: Dining cars

The Manhattan Limited was a passenger train of the Pennsylvania Railroad which served the Chicago—New York City route.

== History ==
The Manhattan Limited was originally the Seashore Limited, an eastbound-only train which was renamed in 1903. The Manhattan Limited became a westbound train as well in 1913 with the renaming of the Chicago Limited. Both trains then ran with all-Pullman consists.

The Manhattan Limited served as an alternative to the Broadway Limited. The Broadway Limited was a sleeping car passenger train, although there were dining accommodations on the train. As with the Broadway, the Manhattan Limited departed New York City's Penn Station in Manhattan en route for Union Station in Chicago, Illinois. The train also carried more second and third class passengers while first class passengers took the Broadway Limited. Departing and arriving earlier than its flagship sister, the Manhattan Limited made far more local stops during daytime hours on a consequently more protracted schedule. It was late to receive streamlined equipment; as late as 1941 it carried just one lightweight 10-5 sleeper.

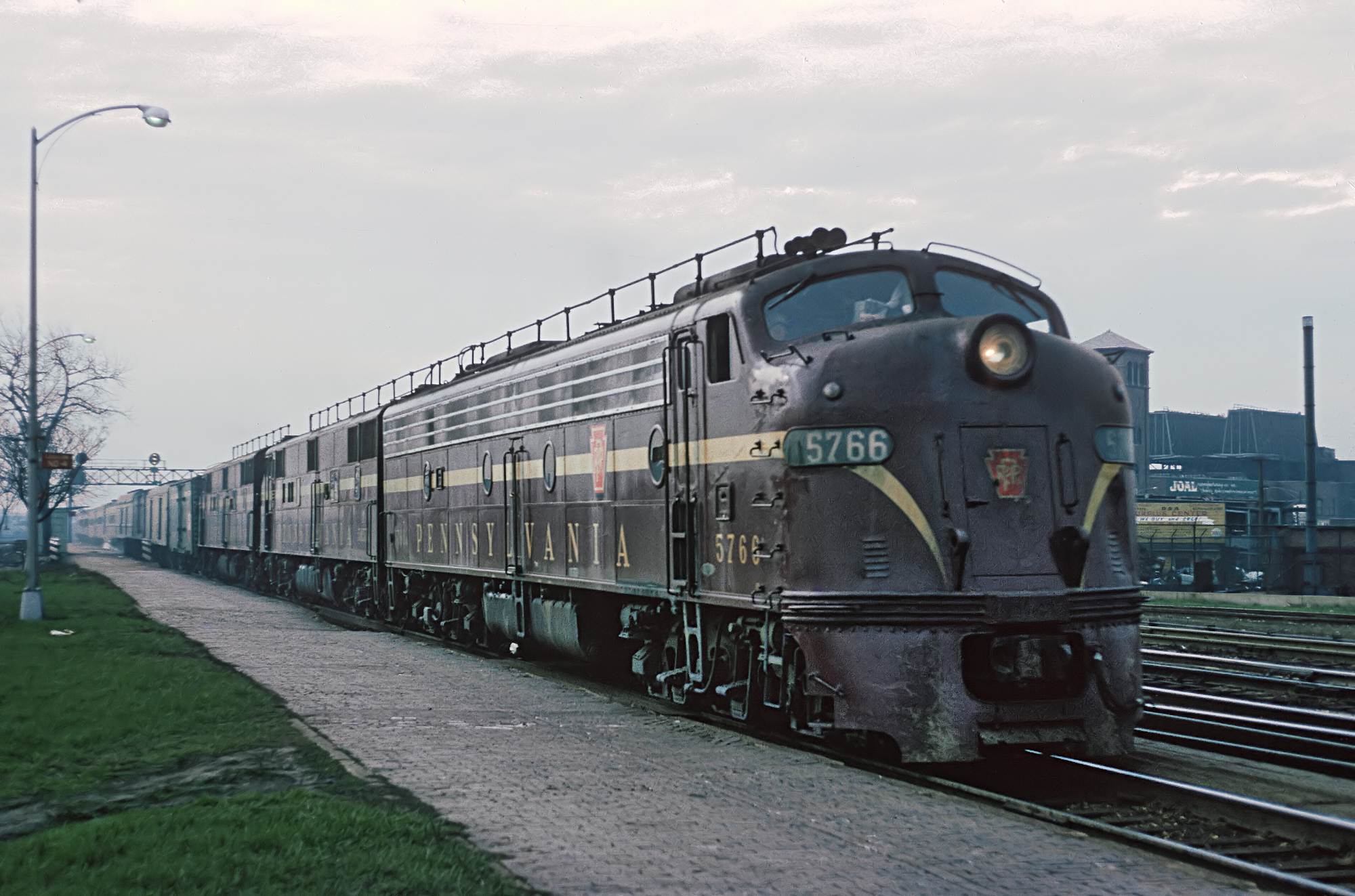
The Manhattan Limited at Englewood, 1965

The train was powered by a GG1 locomotive between New York and Harrisburg. As with the Broadway Limited, it changed locomotives at Harrisburg, Pennsylvania. The famous class K4s took the train the rest of the way. After 1957, when the Pennsylvania Railroad replaced steam locomotives in favor of the new and less costly diesels, the Manhattan Limited was no exception to dieselization, the Pennsylvania Railroad placing in charge of the train tuscan red EMD E8 passenger diesels.

The eastbound Manhattan Limited received the Pittsburgher's sleepers after the latter's demise on September 13, 1964. The Manhattan Limited lost sleeper service west of Pittsburgh in both directions on March 3, 1968. The Manhattan Limited was retained after the Pennsylvania Railroad merged with the New York Central Railroad into the ill-fated Penn Central, but in 1970 the Penn Central petitioned the Interstate Commerce Commission (ICC) to abandon the train. By then the Manhattan Limited's consist was down to two coaches and a snack bar. At Pittsburgh a single waiting underutilized sleeping car and one of the last operating Railway Post Office cars from the sidetracks of the adjacent U.S. Post Office were switched into the eastbound consist behind the locomotive for the overnight leg to New York City, evidently remnants of The Pittsburgher. The train was also available to transport specialty cars of traveling performance shows such as Holiday on Ice. The ICC granted the Penn Central's discontinuation request, but the passage of the Rail Passenger Service Act kept the Manhattan Limited running while Amtrak formed. Amtrak did not retain the Manhattan Limited, choosing the Broadway Limited instead. The Manhattan Limited made its final run on April 30, 1971.

== Motive Power ==
Here is a list of motive power used on the Manhattan Limited:

- PRR E6 4-4-2 type steam locomotive
- PRR K4s 4-6-2 type steam locomotive
- PRR S1 6-4-4-6 type steam locomotive
- PRR S2 6-8-6 type steam turbine locomotive
- PRR T1 4-4-4-4 type steam locomotive
- EMD E8 passenger diesel electric locomotive
- PRR GG1 4-6-0+0-6-4 electric locomotive
