= Leading wheel =

Unpowered wheel at the front of a locomotive

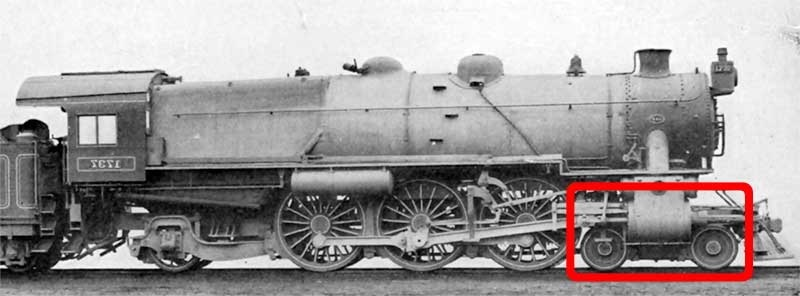
The leading wheels (boxed) on Pennsylvania Railroad 1737

The leading wheel, or leading axle or pilot wheel, of a steam locomotive is an unpowered wheel or axle located in front of the driving wheels. The axle or axles of the leading wheels are normally located on a leading truck. Leading wheels are used to help the locomotive negotiate curves and to support the front portion of the boiler.

== Overview ==
Many leading bogies do not have simple rotational motion about a vertical pivot.

Bogies with a sliding motion controlled by springs was patented by William Adams in 1865. Other designs used swing links to take the weight of the bogie with a centering action. The first use of leading wheels is commonly attributed to John B. Jervis, who employed them in his 1832 design for a locomotive with four leading wheels and two driving wheels (a type that became known as the Jervis). In the Whyte system of describing locomotive wheel arrangements, his locomotive would be classified as a 4-2-0, that is to say, it had four leading wheels, two driving wheels, and no trailing wheels. In the UIC classification system, which counts axles rather than wheels and uses letters to denote powered axles, the Jervis would be classified 2A.

Locomotives without leading trucks are generally regarded as unsuitable for high speed use. The British Railway Inspectorate condemned the practice in 1895, following an accident involving two 0-4-4s at Doublebois, Cornwall, on the Great Western Railway. Other designers, however, persisted with the practice and the famous 0-4-2 Gladstone class passenger expresses of the London, Brighton and South Coast Railway remained in trouble-free service until 1933. A single leading axle (known as a pony truck) increases stability somewhat, while a four-wheel leading truck is almost essential for high-speed operation.

The highest number of leading wheels on a single locomotive is six, as seen on the 6-2-0 Crampton type and the Pennsylvania Railroad's 6-4-4-6 S1 duplex locomotive and 6-8-6 S2 steam turbine. Six-wheel leading trucks were not very popular. The Cramptons were built in the 1840s, but it was not until 1939 that the PRR used one on the S1.

== See also ==
- AAR wheel arrangement
- Adams axle
- UIC classification of locomotive axle arrangements
