= The Jeffersonian (train) =

Luxury train service

Jeffersonian
Overview
- Service type: Inter-city rail
- Status: Discontinued
- Locale: Northeastern United States, Midwestern United States
- First service: 1941
- Last service: 1956
- Former operator: Pennsylvania Railroad

Route
- Termini: St. Louis; Washington, D.C. or New York City

Technical
- Track gauge: 1,435 mm (4 ft 8 1/2 in)

The Jeffersonian was an all-coach passenger train operated by the Pennsylvania Railroad between New York City, Washington, D.C., and St. Louis. Inaugurated in 1941, the service equaled that of the Trail Blazer, and it was equipped with modernized coaches, twin diners, and observation cars. In 1948, it was re-equipped with new lightweight cars and given a unique car, a recreation car, complete with a movie theater, game tables, and a playpen for kids. In 1956, the Jeffersonian was discontinued, and its cars went to other trains. Its coaches went to the Indianapolis Limited and Spirit of St. Louis (breaking that train's all-Pullman status). In addition, the General started carrying through cars to Washington, D.C. Its recreation car went to the Penn Texas.
