= Trailing wheel =

Unpowered locomotive wheel located rear of the driving wheels

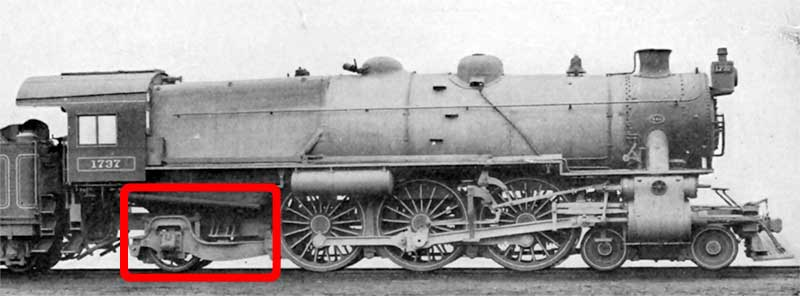
The trailing wheels (boxed) on Pennsylvania Railroad 1737

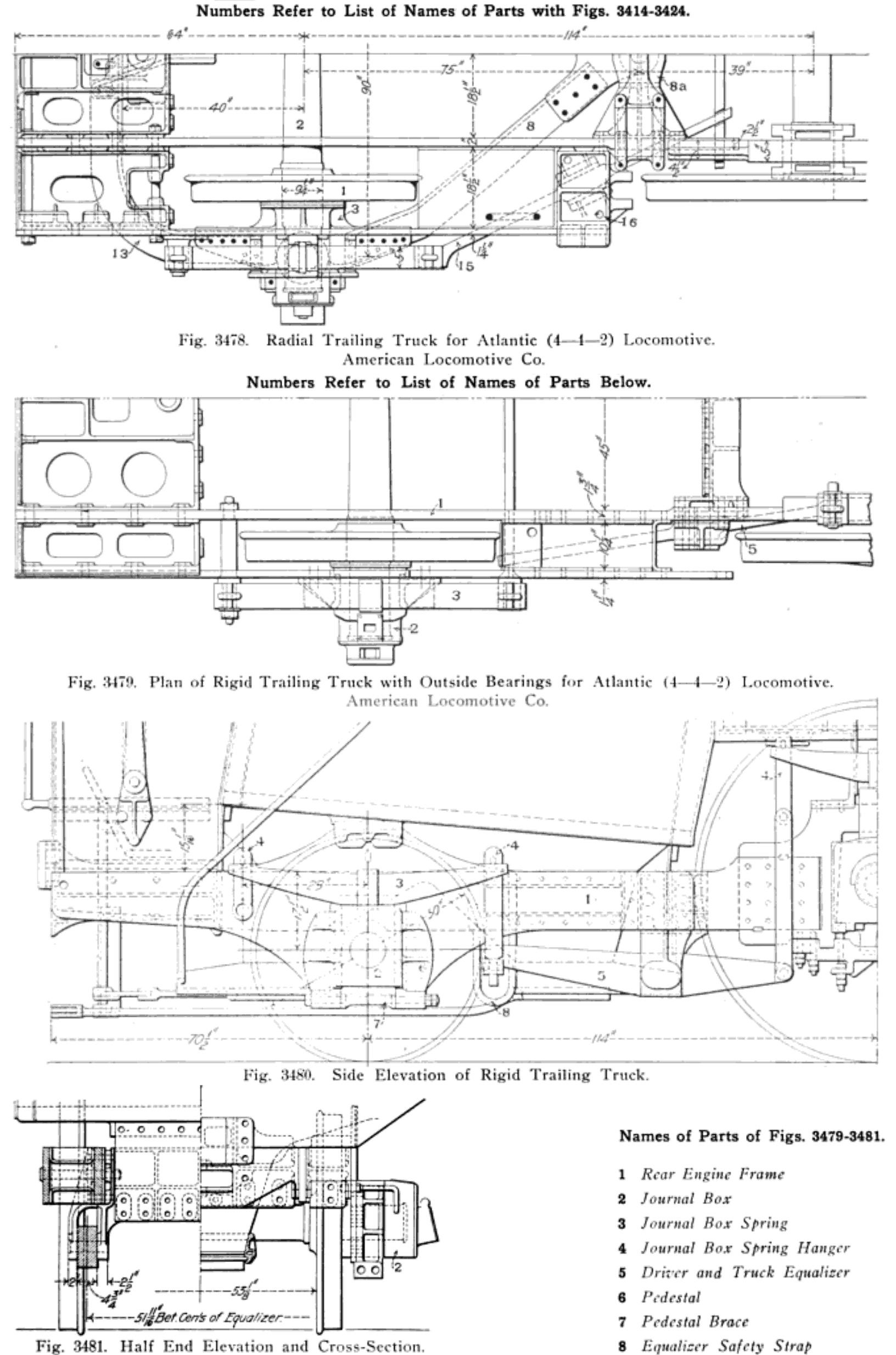
A cross-sectional view of a rigid trailing truck

On a steam locomotive, a trailing wheel or trailing axle is generally an unpowered wheel or axle (wheelset) located behind the driving wheels. The axle of the trailing wheels is usually located in a trailing truck. On some large locomotives, a booster engine was mounted on the trailing truck to provide extra tractive effort when starting a heavy train and at low speeds on gradients.

Trailing wheels were used in some early locomotives but fell out of favor for a time during the latter 19th century. As demand for more powerful locomotives increased, trailing wheels began to be used to support the crew cab and rear firebox area.

Trailing wheels first appeared on American locomotives between 1890 and 1895, but their axle worked in rigid pedestals. It enabled boilers to be lowered, since the top of the main frames was dropped down behind the driving wheels and under the firebox. The firebox could also be longer and wider, increasing the heating surface area and steam generation capacity of the boiler, and therefore its power. The concept was soon improved to provide radial lateral movement by placing the pair of trailing wheels and their axle in a fabricated sub-frame or truck, usually with outside bearings as they gave the best lateral riding stability. One-piece cast-steel trailer trucks were developed about 1915, to provide the additional strength for a booster engine to be fitted to the trailing axle. Finally, about 1921 the Delta trailing truck was developed with an inverted-rocker centering device at the rear ends of the truck frame. Delta trucks were soon enlarged to carry four trailing wheels, and later six.

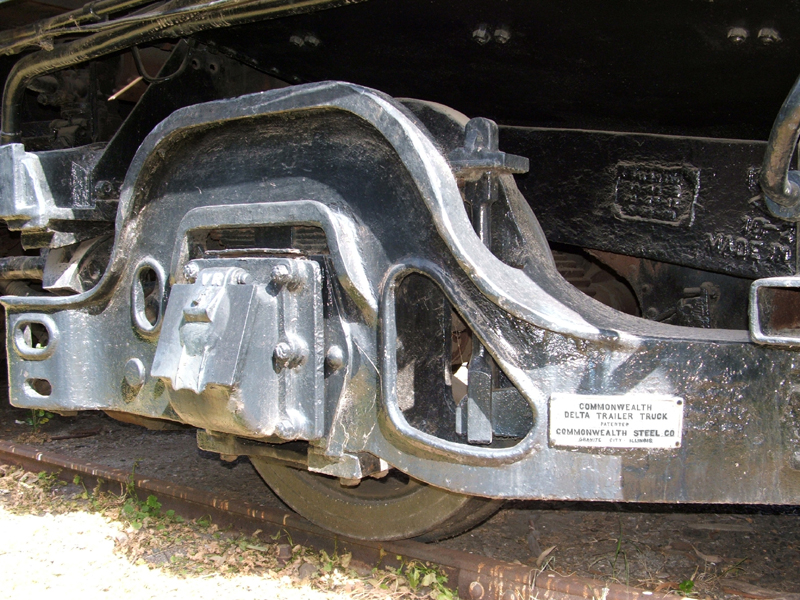
A "Delta" type trailing truck, fabricated using a one-piece casting by Commonwealth Steel Company

In the Whyte notation, trailing wheels are designated by the last numbers in the series. For example, the 2-8-2 Mikado type locomotive had two leading wheels, eight driving wheels, and two trailing wheels. Some locomotives such as the 4-4-0 American type had no trailing wheels and were designated with a zero in the final place.

In the Whyte notation the number designates the number of wheels rather than the number of axles, thus the final 2 in the Mikado's 2-8-2 refers to two wheels (one axle) while the Northern type's 4-8-4 designation refers to four wheels (two axles).

The highest number of trailing wheels on a single locomotive is six, as seen on 2-6-6-6 Allegheny type and the Pennsylvania Railroad's 6-8-6 steam turbine and 6-4-4-6 duplex locomotives, as well as numerous Mason Bogie locomotives.

In the UIC classification system, the number of axles rather than the number of wheels is counted.

== See also ==
- AAR wheel arrangement
- Steam locomotive components
- UIC classification of locomotive axle arrangements
