= Pittsburgher =

Overview
- Service type: Inter-city rail
- Status: Discontinued
- Locale: Northeastern United States
- First service: January 14, 1924
- Last service: 1964
- Former operator(s): Pennsylvania Railroad

Route
- Termini: New York City; Pittsburgh

Technical
- Track gauge: 1,435 mm (4 ft 8 1/2 in)

The Pittsburgher was an overnight limited passenger train operated by the Pennsylvania Railroad between New York City and Pittsburgh, Pennsylvania over the Pennsylvania's Main Line. It operated from 1924 to 1964 and one of the most prestigious trains operated by the Pennsylvania and perhaps the premier train between New York and Pittsburgh.

== History ==
The Pittsburgher began operation on January 14, 1924. The Pittsburgher was the premier Pennsylvania train operating between New York and Pittsburgh. Although not streamlined in 1938 as part of the "Fleet of Modernism", it was completely upgraded with streamlined equipment (but with no observation car) at the express request of U.S. steel business clientele. Although the train was considered all-Pullman, it frequently carried coaches on the end for day travelers going to Pittsburgh and back. In 1944, the Pittsburgher was discontinued as part of a government order that prohibited the use of sleeping cars between points less than 450 miles (720 km) apart so the government could free up sleeping cars for the war effort. The next day, it was reinstated as a day train between the two points. By late 1945, it was back to running as an overnight, all-Pullman train between New York and Pittsburgh. Service was discontinued in 1964, and its sleepers were transferred to the Manhattan Limited.

== Equipment ==
During the 1940s, the Pittsburgher was assigned lightweight equipment from a pool of cars built by Pullman-Standard for the Pennsylvania Railroad immediately before World War II. These included City-series cars, with 18 roomettes; Brook-series cars, with 12 duplex single rooms and 5 double bedrooms; Imperial-series cars with four compartments, two drawing rooms, and four double bedrooms; and County-series cars, with 13 double bedrooms. The trains also carried a Colonial-series car with a drawing room, three double bedrooms, and a bar lounge. These were originally built in 1938 for use on the Liberty Limited, General, and Spirit of St. Louis. The trains also carried heavyweight baggage cars, a lightweight dining car, and westbound conveyed a Boston sleeping car from the New York, New Haven and Hartford Railroad's William Penn.
