= 6-4-4-6 =

Duplex locomotive wheel arrangement

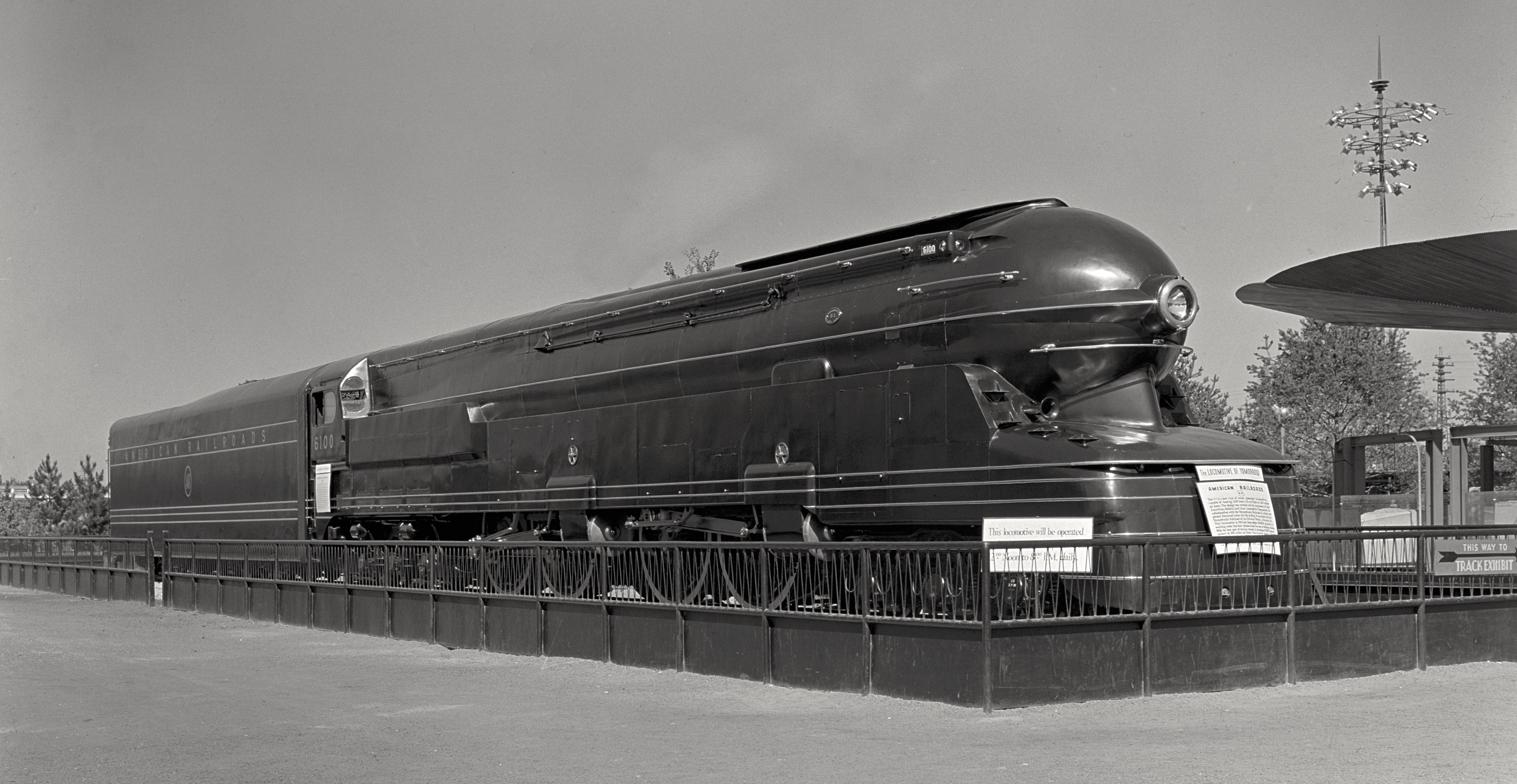
The Pennsylvania Railroad's lone S1 was the only 6-4-4-6 ever constructed.

A 6-4-4-6 steam locomotive, in the Whyte notation for describing locomotive wheel arrangements, is one with six leading wheels, two sets of four driving wheels, and six trailing wheels.

Other equivalent classifications are:

- UIC classification: 3BB3 (also known as German classification and Italian classification)
- French classification: 3223
- Turkish classification: 2525
- Swiss classification: 2/5+2/5 up to the early 1920s, later 4/10

Only one was produced, the Pennsylvania Railroad's sole class S1 of 1939. It was a duplex locomotive, the longest and heaviest rigid frame reciprocating steam locomotive ever built and is referred to as the Pennsylvania Type. This experimental locomotive was exhibited at the 1939 New York World's Fair, and was afterward placed in limited service between Chicago, Illinois, and Crestline, Ohio. The locomotive was too large to work elsewhere in the system. Pennsylvania Railroad executive hoped that the locomotive could haul 1,000 tons at 100 miles per hour, which were exceeded in a December 1940 test run which reached 101 mph with 1,350 tons being pulled. While it was capable of very high speeds, no firm documentary evidence has so far surfaced to confirm the record 133 mph run cited in the December 1941 issue of Popular Mechanics magazine which, if true, would make this locomotive the fastest steam locomotive ever built.
