= Lima station (Pennsylvania Railroad) =

Former train station in Lima, Ohio, U.S.

Lima, OH
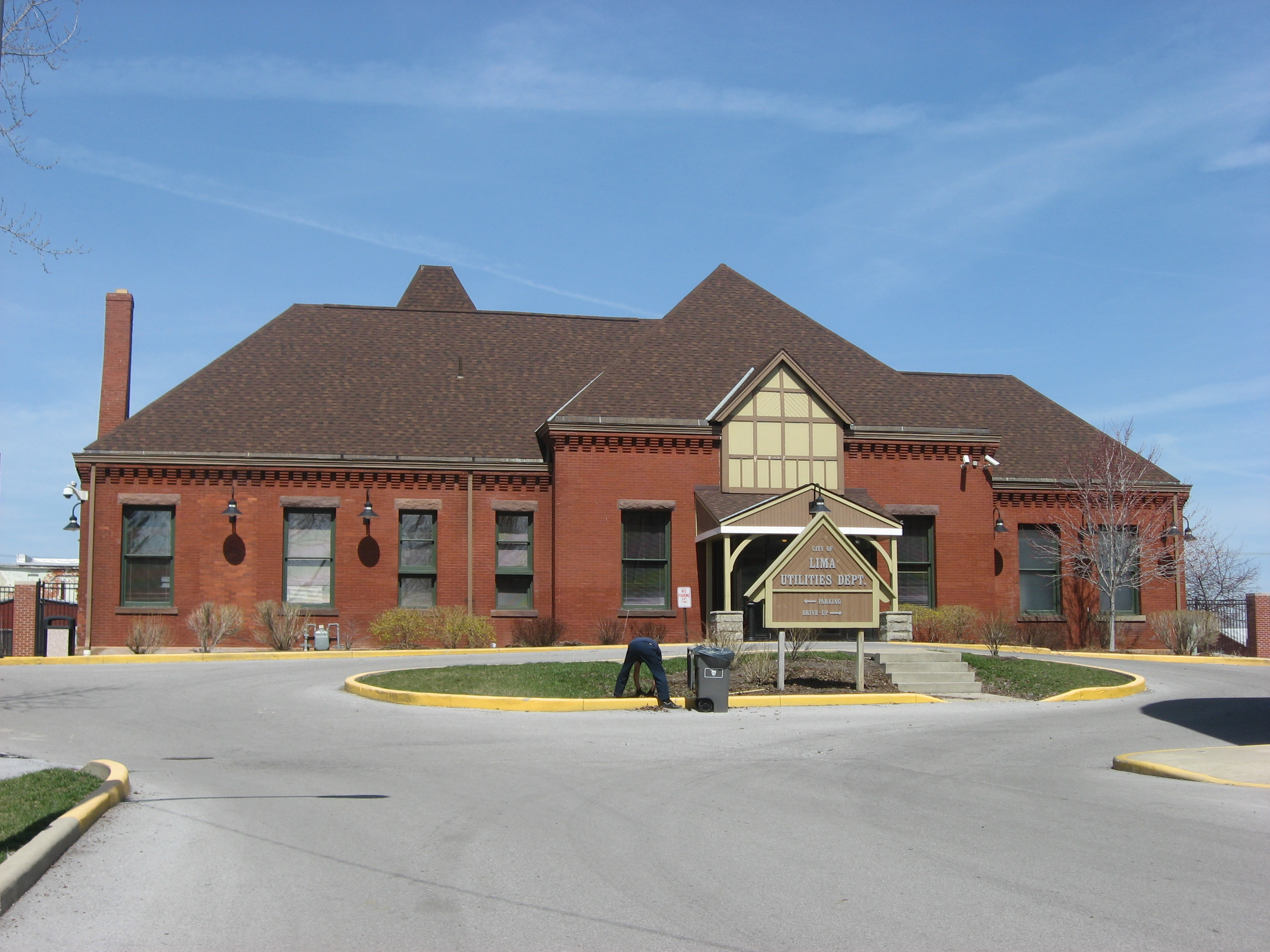
- The former station building in March 2010

General information
- Location: 424 North Central Avenue; Lima, Ohio
- Coordinates: 40°44′42″N 84°6′7″W

History
- Closed: November 11, 1990
- Rebuilt: 1887

Former services
Preceding station	Amtrak	Following station
Fort Wayne toward Chicago	Broadway Limited	Crestline toward New York
Fort Wayne toward Chicago	Capitol Limited	Crestline toward Washington, D.C.
Preceding station	Pennsylvania Railroad	Following station
Elida toward Chicago	Main Line	Lafayette toward New York or Exchange Place
- Lima Pennsylvania Railroad Passenger Depot
- U.S. National Register of Historic Places
- Built: 1887
- Architectural style: Queen Anne
- NRHP reference No.: 03000805
- Added to NRHP: August 21, 2003
Location

Lima station is a historic former train station in Lima, Ohio, United States. Built for the Pennsylvania Railroad in 1887, it is a brick Queen Anne structure that rests on a sandstone foundation. The Lima station is located on the former Pennsylvania Railroad's mainline between New York City and Chicago. Lima station was formerly served by the Pennsylvania Railroad's Pennsylvania Limited and by its flagship Broadway Limited daily passenger trains between New York City and Chicago in its later years.

== Railroad history ==
Allen County's first railroad line was built by the Indiana Railroad in 1854 and later subsumed into the Pennsylvania Railroad system. By the early twentieth century, Lima was a transportation center located at the confluence of five major American railroads: Pennsylvania Railroad; Baltimore & Ohio Railroad (a.k.a. B&O); New York, Chicago & St. Louis Railroad (a.k.a. Nickel Plate Road); Erie Railroad; and Detroit, Toledo & Ironton Railroad (a.k.a. DT&I), and its economy was highly dependent on the industry-leading, world-famous Lima Locomotive Works. The Pittsburgh, Fort Wayne and Chicago Railroad, a subsidiary of the Pennsylvania, built a new station in 1887. From 1942 to 1970, the station hosted the Free Serviceman's Canteen, assisting troops in transit during World War II, the Korean War, and the Vietnam War.

Lima was a stop for several Pennsylvania Railroad Chicago–New York trains including the Admiral (until 1964), General (until 1967), Manhattan Limited (until 1971), and Pennsylvania Limited (until 1971). The Broadway Limited began stopping in 1968; it was the only service on the line kept by Amtrak in 1971. The Capitol Limited began serving the station in 1981. Both the Broadway Limited and Capitol Limited were rerouted in 1990, ending service to Lima.

Through consolidation of class I railroads and subsequent abandonment and downgrading of redundant lines, the railroad industry in Lima has declined significantly: by the 1990s all passenger train service to Lima was discontinued and the former Pennsylvania's mainline through Lima had been relegated to branch line service by the Norfolk Southern Railway. As a result, Lima's Pennsylvania station went vacant, the rest of the city's passenger train stations, freight depots and other railroad buildings had long since been demolished, and by the late 1990s all of the 67-acres of buildings that once housed the Lima Locomotive Works had also been demolished.

Unlike much of Lima's railroad-related structures (e.g., the Baltimore & Ohio, Nickel Plate Road and Erie Railroad train stations and roundhouses), the Pennsylvania Railroad station has survived in good condition. Its well-preserved historic architecture and its place in local history qualified it for addition to the National Register of Historic Places in 2003 as the Lima Pennsylvania Railroad Passenger Depot. One year later, the station was renovated for adaptive reuse: although a new entrance was added and modern restrooms were attached to the station's rear, its historic integrity was little changed, and the yard surrounding the station was kept in its previous state. Working for a Lima business association, the LJB construction company completed the renovation project in May 2004. Today, the station is used as the offices of the customer service center for the Lima utilities department.
