= Railway Museum of Greater Cincinnati =

Coordinates: 39.048069°N 84.508166°W

The Railway Museum of Greater Cincinnati is a railroad museum in Covington, Kentucky.

== Collection ==
The museum owns and maintains a collection of 80 historic railroad equipment located on a 4-acre (16,000 m^{2}) site.

The museum was founded in 1975 when a club of local railroad enthusiasts decided to run passenger cars on Amtrak trains. Several local members purchased cars for this goal. In the late 1980s, Amtrak tightened its restrictions on passenger cars, making it too expensive for most private citizens to keep them up.

Though the Amtrak excursions ended, the cars remained as the core of the present collection. At that point the goal of the museum changed and now focuses on the preservation of the equipment. Tom Holley, former chairman of the board, stated "Now the primary purpose of the museum is the collection of the equipment that belonged to the seven railroads then entered Cincinnati."

Pennsylvania Railroad E8 locomotive #5888 has been undergoing restoration for the past few years. A "theatrical" baggage car (the Juliet, one of 47 built by the Pennsy between 1917 and 1922) sits on the track beside the locomotive and will serve as a mobile staging area for the renovation. The museum also has a large collection of Pullman-Standard cars including the Metropolitan View built in 1938 for the PRR's Broadway Limited, and a BM70nb railway post office (PRR #6518) modernized for the same train.

Some of the other equipment includes former PRR #9408, an EMD SW1 switcher, a preserved Dinky, Brookville BMD 15-ton switcher, former Baltimore and Ohio Railroad modern lightweight coach the La Paz, a preserved troop sleeper, an early Southern Railway business car, and former RI #428 (El Comedor) dining car.

The museum is located at 315 Southern Avenue in the Latonia area of Covington.

== Rolling stock ==
Diesel locomotives

| Image | Operator | Road Number | Class | Model | Date | Notes |
|---|---|---|---|---|---|---|
| EMD E8 | Pennsylvania Railroad | 5888 | EP-22 | EMD E8 | 1951 | Undergoing restoration |
| EMD SW1 | Pennsylvania Railroad | 9408 | ES-6 | EMD SW1 | 1950 | |

Passenger cars

| Image | Operator | Road Number | Class | Type | Manufacturer | Date | Notes |
|---|---|---|---|---|---|---|---|
| | Pennsylvania Railroad | 6518 | BM70nb | Railway Post Office | PRR | 1912 | Fully equipped with sorting racks cancellation tables, parcel bins |
| | Pennsylvania Railroad | 6062 Juliet | B70A | Baggage car | PRR | 1928 | Used for the transportation of Theatrical scenery |
| | Pullman Company; Pennsylvania Railroad | Waltersburg | Plan 3410A | 12-1 sleeping car | Pullman | 1924 | |
| | Pullman Company; Pennsylvania Railroad | Cascade Gardens | Plan 4072B | 10-5 sleeping car | Pullman-Standard | 1939 | |
| | Pullman Company; Pennsylvania Railroad | Cascade Heights | Plan 4072C | 10-5 sleeping car | Pullman-Standard | 1940 | |
| | Pullman Company; Pennsylvania Railroad | Metropolitan View | Plan 4080A | 1-2 sleeper buffet-lounge-observation car | Pullman-Standard | 1938 | |
| | Baltimore and Ohio Railroad | 5503 La Paz | | Coach | Pullman-Standard | 1949 | Built for B&O streamliner The Columbian |
| | Baltimore and Ohio Railroad | 3315 Chicago | | Tavern-Lounge-Observation car | Pullman-Standard | 1949 | Built for B&O streamliner The Columbian |
