= Fort Wayne station =

Historic train station in Fort Wayne, Indiana, U.S.

Fort Wayne, IN
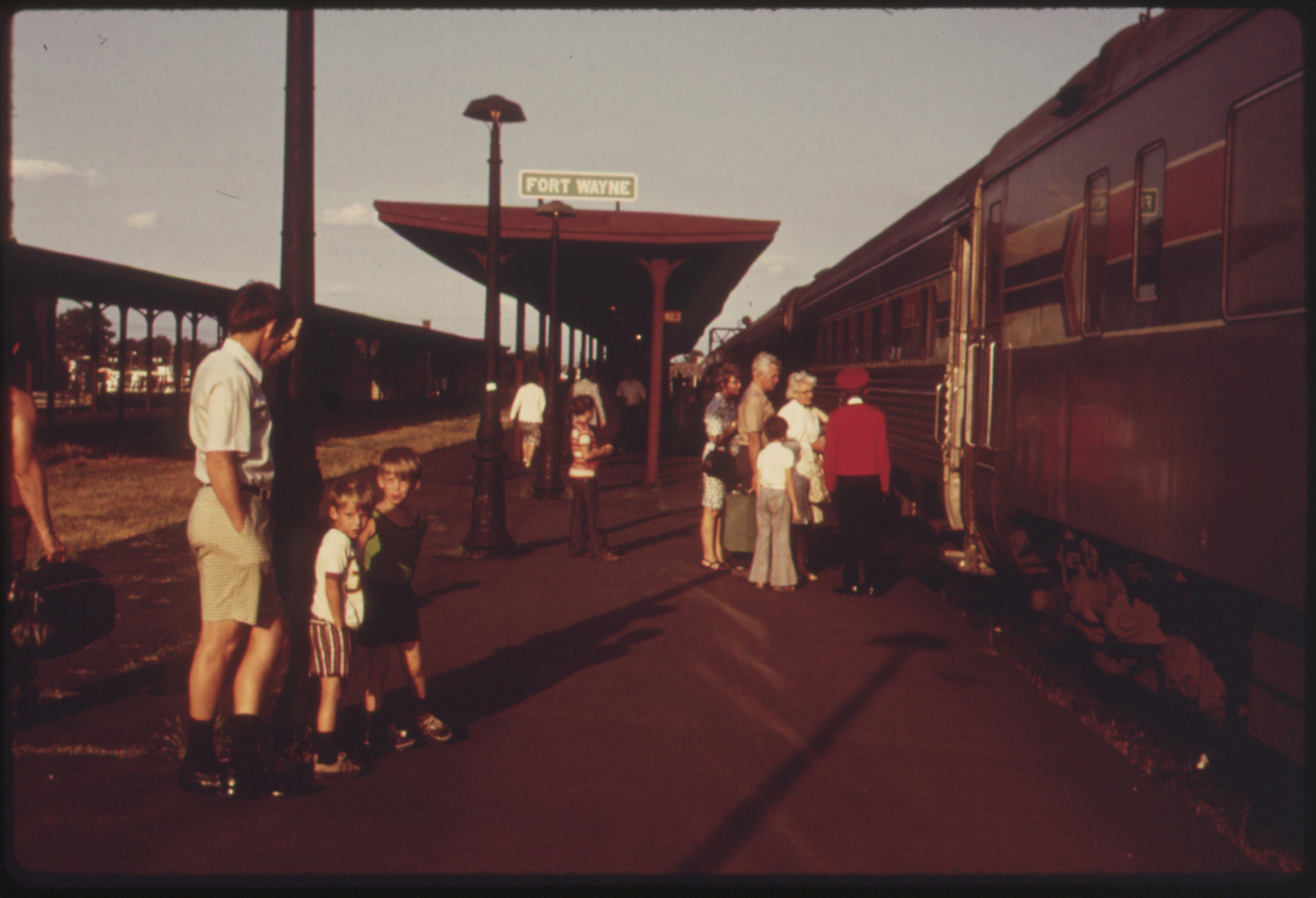
- Passengers board Amtrak's Broadway Limited at the station in 1974

General information
- Location: 221 Baker Street, Fort Wayne, Indiana; USA

History
- Opened: March 23, 1914
- Closed: November 11, 1990

Former services
Preceding station	Amtrak	Following station
Warsaw toward Chicago	Broadway Limited	Lima toward New York
Warsaw toward Chicago	Capitol Limited	Lima toward Washington, D.C.
Preceding station	Pennsylvania Railroad	Following station
Arcola toward Chicago	Main Line	Maples toward New York or Exchange Place
Huntertown toward Mackinaw City	Grand Rapids & Indiana Railway	Hoagland toward Richmond
Preceding station	Wabash Railroad	Following station
Roanoke toward St. Louis	St. Louis – Detroit	New Haven toward Detroit
Terminus	Fort Wayne – Toledo	New Haven toward Toledo
- Pennsylvania Railroad Station
- U.S. National Register of Historic Places
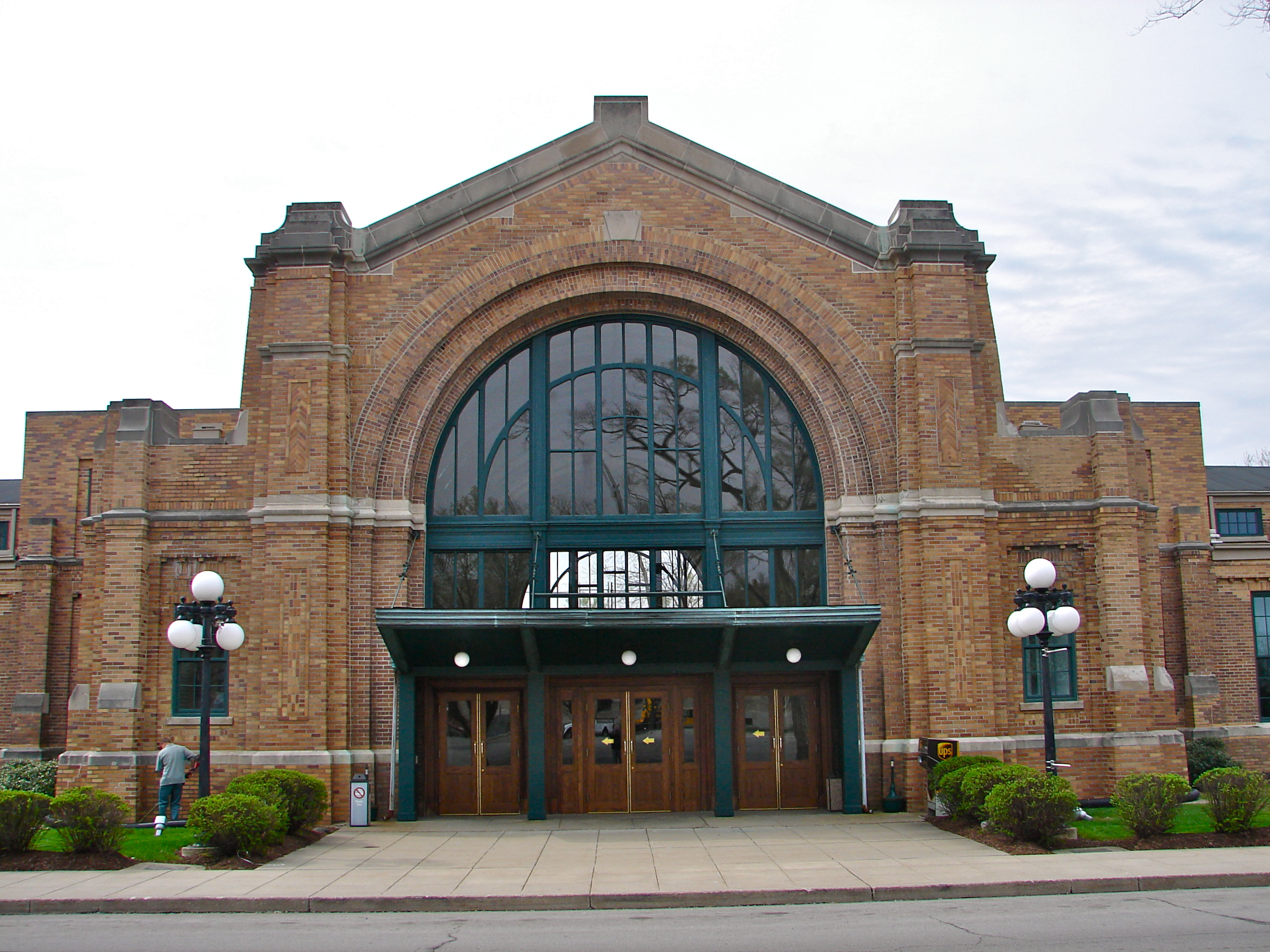

- Location within Indiana Location within the United States
- Location: 221 West Baker Street, Fort Wayne, Indiana
- Coordinates: 41°4′20″N 85°8′26″W
- Built: 1914
- Architect: George B. Swift & Co., William L. Price
- Architectural style: American Craftsman
- NRHP reference No.: 98001056
- Added to NRHP: 1998
Location

The Pennsylvania Railroad Station, also known as Baker Street Station, is a former passenger rail station in downtown Fort Wayne, Indiana. The American Craftsman-style station opened to the public March 23, 1914, at a cost of $550,000.

== History ==
The station saw its most heavy usage during World War II, when about 3,000 visitors passed through the station daily. The station was also frequented by politicians on whistle stop train tours, including U.S. Presidents Harding, Coolidge, Hoover, Franklin D. Roosevelt, Truman, and Eisenhower. Until 1957 a Grand Rapids originating branch of the Pennsylvania Railroad's Chicago-Florida Southland made a stop in at the station, and picked up passengers from a connecting Wabash Railroad train from Detroit, Michigan. Until 1961 the PRR's Cincinnati, Ohio-Mackinaw City, Michigan Northern Arrow also made a stop there, and picked up connecting passenger rail cars from Chicago. Until 1971 the Penn Central ran the Broadway Limited and several other Chicago-New York City passenger trains, Admiral, Manhattan Limited and Pennsylvania Limited through the station.

In the second half of the 20th century, the station served as a stop on Amtrak's Broadway Limited (Chicago—Pittsburgh—New York) and Capitol Limited (Chicago–Pittsburgh–Washington) lines until November 1990 when Amtrak was forced to reroute about 25 miles (40 km) north of Fort Wayne. The nearest active passenger train station is Waterloo (for the Capitol Limited), 32 miles to the north.

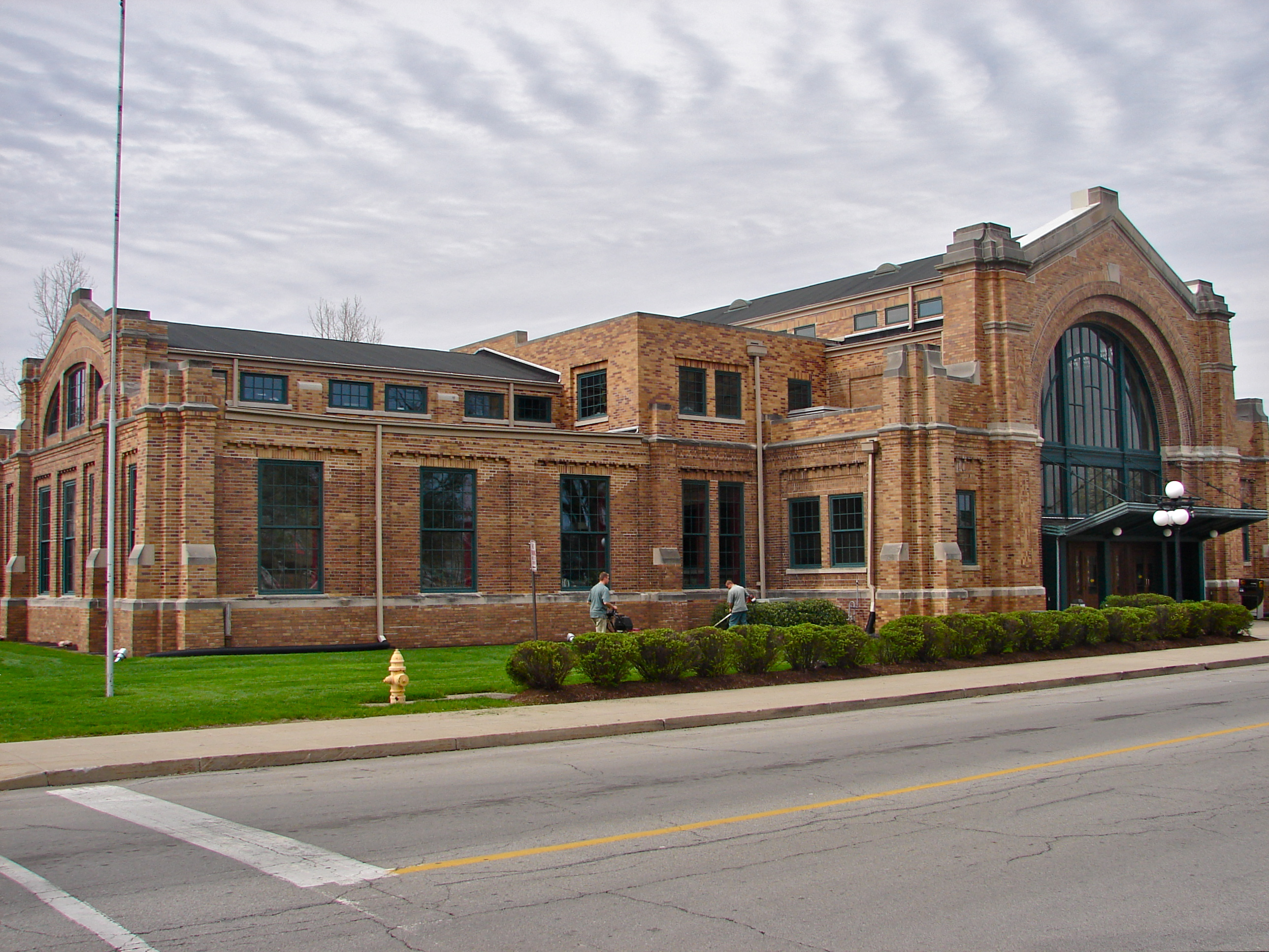
View from the northeast

Today, Baker Street Station's concourse is used as a banquet hall and community events space, while the east and west wings have been converted into office space. Over the last decade, residents and local leaders have begun a movement to bring passenger rail service back to the city and station in the form of Amtrak or other high-speed rail service.

Although the station has been without passenger rail service for over 30 years, it has remained a landmark to the city, designated a Fort Wayne Local Historic District in 1990. and later, was added to the National Register of Historic Places in 1998 as the Pennsylvania Railroad Station.

== See also ==
- National Register of Historic Places listings in Allen County, Indiana
- List of former Amtrak stations
