= Golden Rocket (train) =

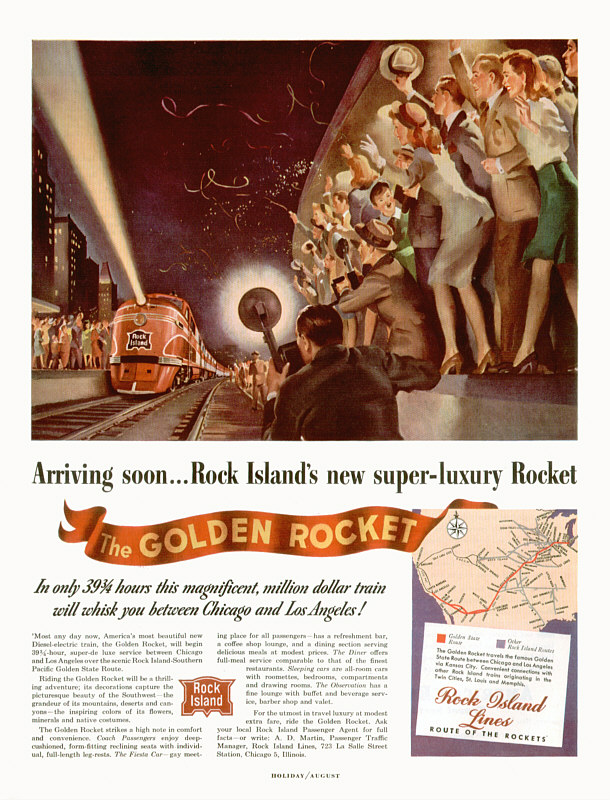
A magazine ad for the Golden Rocket from the Rock Island.

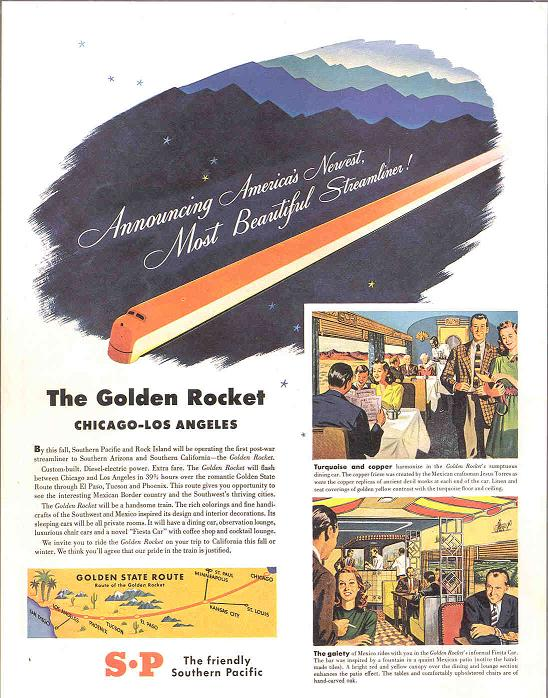
A magazine ad for the Golden Rocket from Southern Pacific.

The Golden Rocket was a proposed named passenger train of the Rock Island (CRIP) and Southern Pacific (SP) railroads. Planned in the late 1940s, Southern Pacific eventually pulled out of the agreement and service never commenced.

== History ==
In February 1946, the Rock Island and Southern Pacific Railroads planned on jointly introducing a high-speed, tri-weekly passenger train that would run between Chicago, Illinois and Los Angeles, California. Two 11-car consists were to have been placed into service on the new line, one owned by the CRIP and the other by the SP. However, just as Pullman-Standard neared completion on the Rock Island trainset in 1947, and in the midst of an aggressive advertising campaign, the Southern Pacific abruptly withdrew from the project. Rock Island took delivery of its rolling stock: a baggage-dormitory car, three coaches, a coffee shop-bar-lounge car, four sleeping cars, and a sleeper-lounge-observation car (with barbershop).

=== Planned rolling stock ===
The Rock Island consist for the Golden Rocket:

1. Baggage-dormitory #820
2. Coach Valle Verde
3. Coach Valle Vista
4. Coach Valle Mar
5. Coffee-shop lounge El Café
6. Diner El Comedor
7. 4-double bedroom, 4-compartment, 2-drawing room sleeper La Quinta
8. 22-roomette sleeper La Costa
9. 12-double bedroom sleeper La Jolla
10. 12-double bedroom sleeper La Palma
11. 2-double bedroom, 1-drawing room sleeper buffet lounge-observation La Mirada

The proposed Southern Pacific consist for the Golden Rocket that was never built:

1. Baggage-dormitory
2. Coach Valle Rio Grande
3. Coach Valle del Sol
4. Coach Valle Imperial
5. Coffee-shop lounge El Café Frontero
6. Diner La Fonda
7. 4-double bedroom, 4-compartment, 2-drawing room sleeper Monte Chiricahua
8. 22-roomette sleeper Monte Santa Rita
9. 12-double bedroom sleeper Monte San Jacinto
10. 12-double bedroom sleeper Santa Catalina
11. 2-double bedroom, 1-drawing room sleeper buffet lounge-observation La Galleria

=== Fate of the equipment ===
The units arrived bearing the ill-fated Golden Rocket's eye-popping livery, painted bright vermilion on top and bare stainless steel on the bottom. The cars also retained the festive Mexican-themed interiors originally intended for the Golden Rocket. Rock Island assigned the cars to service on the Golden State, its other transcontinental train (jointly operated with Southern Pacific).

The Golden State's cars and locomotives retained the Golden Rocket colors well into 1953, after which time the locomotives were repainted in the SP's well-known red-and-orange Daylight livery. Both railroads advertised the Golden Rocket. It was promoted as "America's Newest, Most Beautiful Streamliner"; instead, it became "the train that never was."

== See also ==
- El Comedor
- Passenger trains on the Chicago, Rock Island and Pacific Railroad
- Passenger trains on the Southern Pacific Railroad
