= View series =

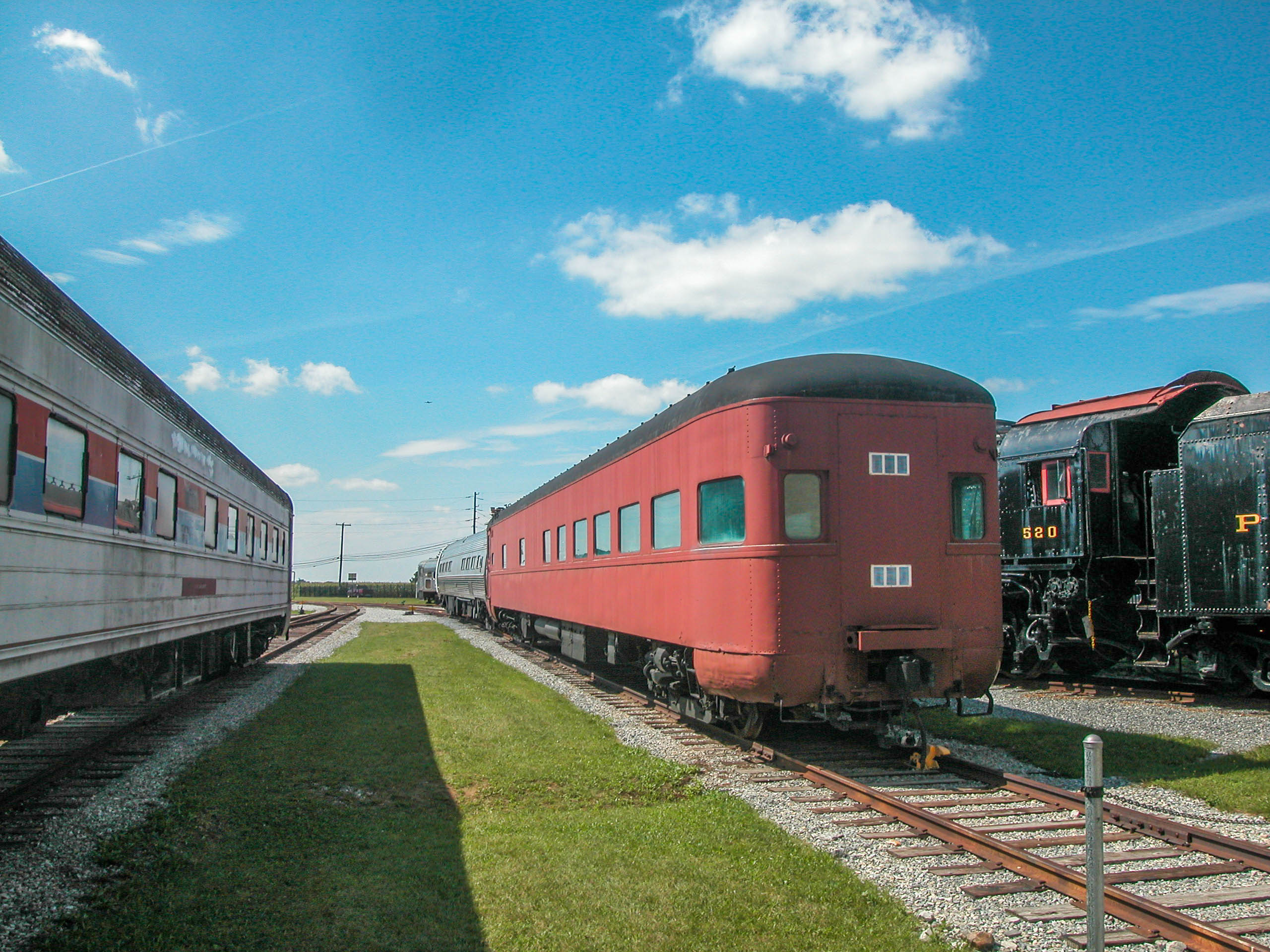
- The Tower View at the Railroad Museum of Pennsylvania in 2006
- Manufacturer: Pullman-Standard
- Order no.: Lot 6548 (1938); Lot 6792 (1949)
- Constructed: 1938; 1949
- Number built: 6
- Diagram: Plan 4080 (1938); Plan 4133 (1949)
- Fleet numbers: 8114–8117; 8419–8420
- Operators: Pennsylvania Railroad

The View series was a fleet of six sleeper-observation lounges built by Pullman-Standard for use on the Pennsylvania Railroad's passenger trains. Pullman built four in 1938 and another two in 1949 after World War II. Their most prominent assignment was on the Broadway Limited, the Pennsylvania's flagship New York–Chicago train, but they were also assigned to the General and the Liberty Limited. Several of the cars have been preserved.

== Design ==
=== Prewar cars ===
The four prewar cars were 84 feet 7 inches (25.78 m) long and weighed 116,400 pounds (52,800 kg). Each car had a vestibule at one end; at the other was a rounded-off observation area. Industrial designer Raymond Loewy gave the cars an Art Deco styling. The exteriors were painted in the Pennsylvania's tuscan red, with a maroon band around the windows and gold pinstripes.

The interior was divided into two sections. At the vestibule end, and extending for half the car length, was a bedroom and two master rooms. The master rooms each contained a private shower. A single hallway to one side led past the private rooms to a lounge area. The lounge contained a buffet, desk, and seating for twenty-two people. Historians describe the interior as "warm, colorful, and cheery."

=== Postwar cars ===
The two postwar cars differed in various minor ways from the prewar cars. Externally, the most obvious difference was that the observation end was squared-off instead of rounded. It was longer, at 85 feet (26 m), and heavier at 137,300 pounds (62,300 kg). The lounge area was arranged with facing chairs, resulting in seating for twenty-five.

== History ==
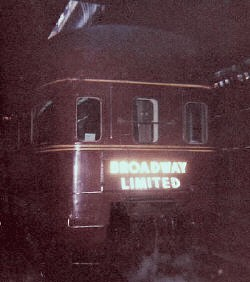
The Mountain View at Chicago in 1963

Pullman-Standard built the first four View series cars as part of the "Fleet of Modernism", comprising 56 new lightweight cars for passenger service on the Pennsylvania Railroad. Two, the Metropolitan View and Skyline View, were assigned to the Broadway Limited. That train was the flagship of the Pennsylvania Railroad, an all-Pullman luxury train providing overnight service between Chicago and New York. The cars went into service on June 15, 1938. The other two, Federal View and Washington View, were assigned to the Liberty Limited, which ran between Chicago and Washington, D.C. The Liberty Limited had once been the Washington section of the Broadway Limited, and while it had gained coaches in 1932, it remained an important train. The shower bath in the master rooms was unique on Pullman trains in the United States well into the 1940s.

Following the end of World War II the Pennsylvania ordered new equipment for the Broadway Limited, including two new View series sleeper-observation cars. These cars, Mountain View and Tower View, were similar in appearance and function to their prewar predecessors. The cars were delivered in January 1949. The displaced prewar cars were assigned to the General, another New York–Chicago train. The cars came off the Liberty Limited in 1957 and two, the Skyline View and Washington View were rebuilt as parlor cars. They were retired no later than 1962. The Pennsylvania merged the Broadway Limited and the General on December 13, 1967. The two postwar cars moved to the Seaboard Coast Line Railroad's Florida Special, a seasonal New York-Florida train. At the end of April Mountain View was sold into private ownership.

Several cars survive. Penn Central, successor to the Pennsylvania, donated Tower View to the Railroad Museum of Pennsylvania in 1970. After a period of private ownership the Railway Museum of Greater Cincinnati acquired the Metropolitan View in 1997. The Railroaders Memorial Museum acquired Mountain View in 2006.
