= Admiral (train) =

Overview
- Service type: Inter-city rail
- Status: Discontinued
- Locale: Midwestern United States/Northeastern United States
- First service: June 30, 1940
- Last service: April 30, 1971
- Former operator(s): Pennsylvania Railroad; From 1968: Penn Central

Route
- Termini: New York City, New York; Chicago, Illinois
- Distance travelled: 907.7 miles (1,460.8 km) (1955)
- Service frequency: Daily (1955)
- Train number(s): Eastbound: 70; Westbound: 71

On-board services
- Seating arrangements: Reclining seat coaches
- Sleeping arrangements: Roomettes, double bedrooms and duplex rooms (1955)
- Catering facilities: Dining car
- Entertainment facilities: Lounge car

Technical
- Rolling stock: Streamlined passenger cars by Pullman Standard
- Track gauge: 4 ft 8 1/2 in (1,435 mm)

The Admiral was a named passenger train of the Pennsylvania Railroad and its successor Penn Central which operated between Chicago, Illinois and New York City. The Admiral began on April 27, 1941, when the Pennsylvania renamed the eastbound Advance General.

== Advance General ==
The Advance General was a train operated by the Pennsylvania Railroad (PRR). It was inaugurated in 1940, and was a second section of the PRR's popular General, and was meant to take the coaches, then only being carried eastbound, and make that train an all-Pullman train. In 1941, it was renamed the Admiral.

== Admiral ==
The new train was eastbound-only until a year later on April 26, 1942, when the Pennsylvania added a westbound counterpart. The Admiral carried both sleepers and coaches plus a diner. After World War II, the Pennsylvania put the Admiral on a 17-hour schedule between Chicago and New York along with the Broadway Limited, Trail Blazer, General and Pennsylvanian. At the time the Admiral carried transcontinental sleeping cars which it exchanged in Chicago with the California Zephyr and other California-bound trains. Mounting losses on its passenger operations led the Pennsylvania to reduce service on the Admiral. From April 29, 1956, onwards the Admiral operated as a local, making more intermediate stops with a longer overall running time. The westbound train ended altogether in 1958. The remaining eastbound Admiral lost its dining car in 1966 and the last of its sleeping cars in 1967, leaving it with mail and express cars, coaches and a snack bar. The eastbound Admiral remained after the merger of the Pennsylvania with the New York Central Railroad as the Penn Central and the train was discontinued on the formation of Amtrak on May 1, 1971.
