= La Paz (B&O) =

The La Paz (B&O #5503) is a 56-seat revenue coach built for the Baltimore and Ohio Railroad by Pullman-Standard in 1949. La Paz was built for the new lightweight Columbian trainset for travel between Baltimore, Maryland, and Chicago, Illinois, via Washington, D.C. La Paz was named in honor of La Paz, Indiana, an important city on the B&O line.

La Paz has been preserved as part of the collection of the Railway Museum of Greater Cincinnati in Covington, Kentucky.
