= New Haven station (Indiana) =

- Wabash Railroad Depot
- U.S. National Register of Historic Places
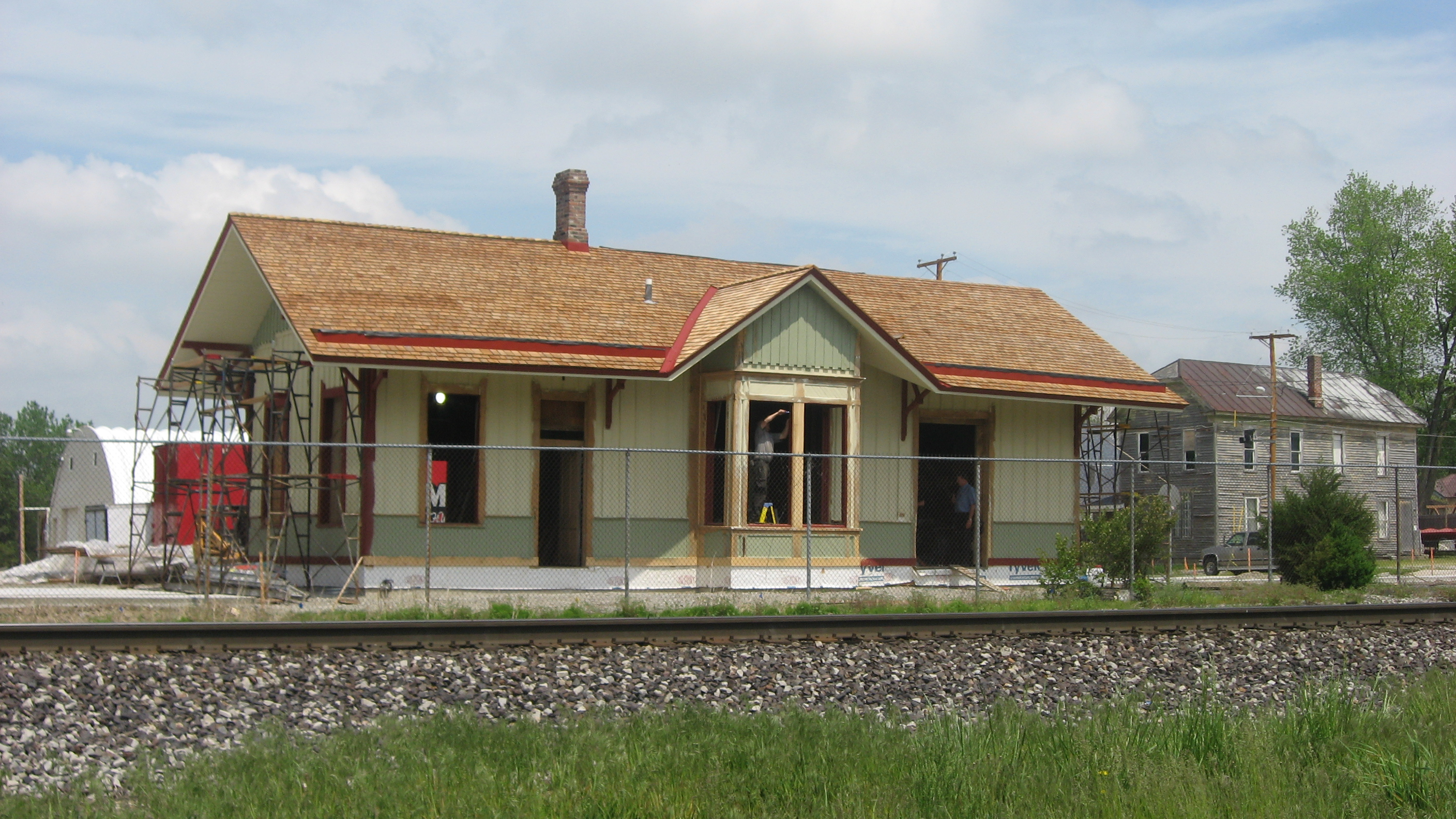
- Wabash Railroad Depot, May 2012

- Location within Indiana Location within the United States
- Location: 530 State St., New Haven, Indiana
- Coordinates: 41°4′18″N 85°1′20″W
- Area: less than one acre
- Architectural style: Stick/eastlake
- NRHP reference No.: 03000146
- Added to NRHP: March 26, 2003

New Haven station is a historic train station located at New Haven, Indiana. It was built in 1890 by the Wabash Railroad. It is a one-story, wood-frame building, with Stick Style / Eastlake movement ornamentation. It measures approximately 50 feet long and 20 feet wide and has a gable roof and board and batten siding.

It was added to the National Register of Historic Places in 2003 as the Wabash Railroad Depot.

Preceding station	Wabash Railroad	Following station
Fort Wayne toward St. Louis	St. Louis – Detroit	Grabill toward Detroit
Fort Wayne Terminus	Fort Wayne – Toledo	Gar Creek toward Toledo
