= Columbian (B&O train) =

Named passenger train operated by the Baltimore and Ohio Railroad

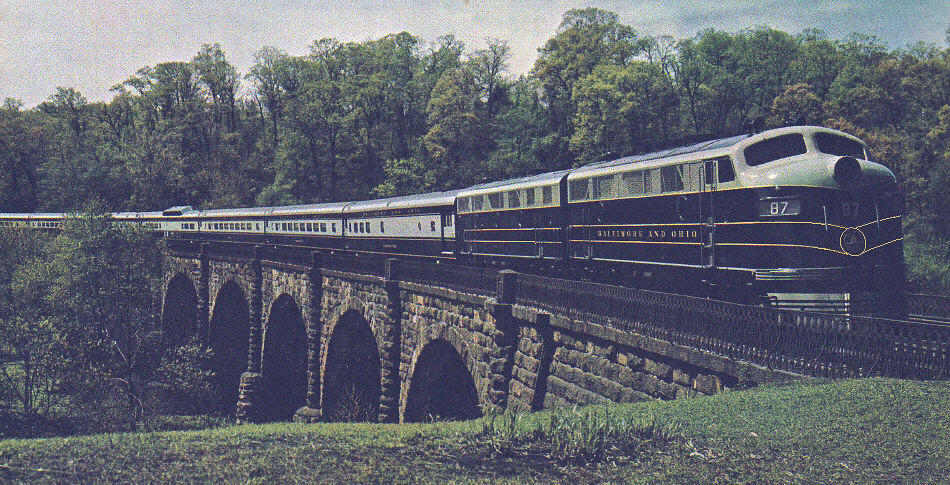
- The Columbian at Thomas Viaduct, Relay, Maryland

Overview
- First service: May 24, 1931
- Last service: April 26, 1964
- Former operator: Baltimore and Ohio Railroad

Route
- Termini: Jersey City, New Jersey (1931–1958); Baltimore, Maryland (1958–1971); Washington, D.C. (1931–1941); Chicago, Illinois
- Train number: 25/26
Route map
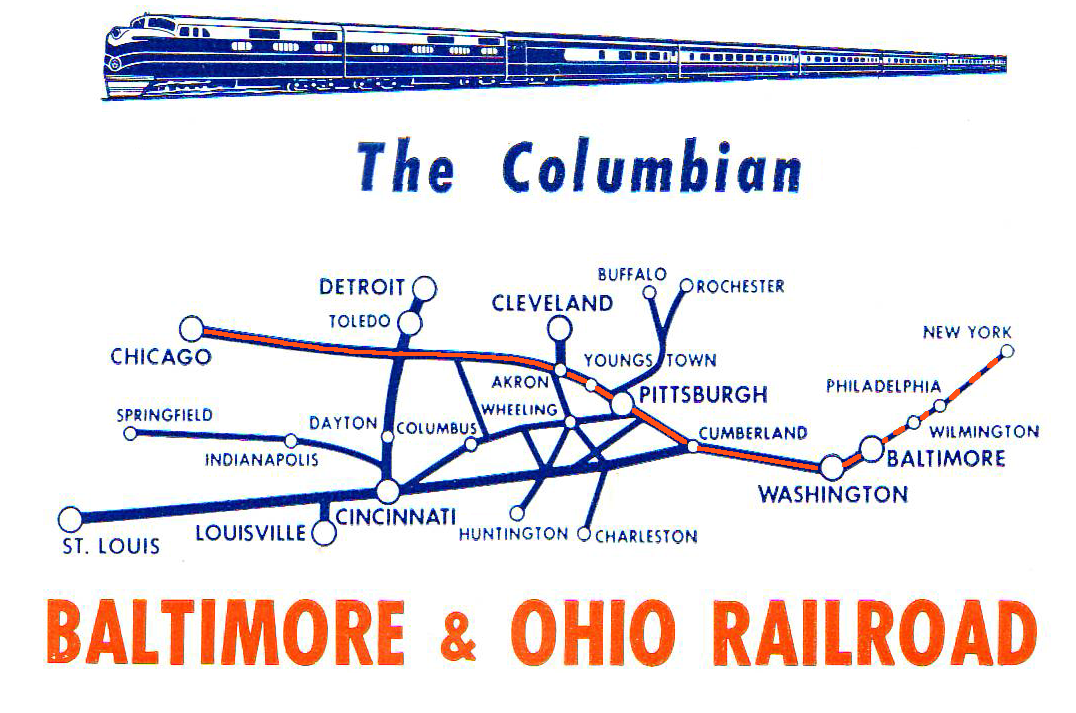

The Columbian was a named passenger train operated by the Baltimore and Ohio Railroad. It was the all-coach supplemental train of the all-Pullman Capitol Limited. It operated from 1931 to 1964. The train's initial route was between Jersey City, New Jersey and Washington, D.C., but in 1941 the Columbian route was lengthened to Jersey City – Chicago, Illinois. It was the first air-conditioned train in the United States.

== History ==
The Columbian between Jersey City and Washington was the first air-conditioned passenger train in North America. Air-conditioned equipment began operating on the train on May 24, 1931. In 1937 the B&O re-equipped the Columbian with cars from the Royal Blue. On December 19, 1941 the B&O extended the Columbian from Washington to Chicago. To support the longer service the Columbian again received cast-offs from the Royal Blue, plus other equipment. The Columbian operated in tandem with the all-Pullman Capitol Limited, running thirty minutes behind. The Capitol Limited conveyed the Columbians coaches between Jersey City and Washington. During World War II the Columbian's consist swelled to 14 cars.

In 1949, a brand new lightweight Columbian train set for travel between Baltimore, Maryland, via Washington to Chicago was built. The consists were ordered from Pullman-Standard for April, 1949 delivery and these two train sets have the distinction of being the only all-new consists built for the B&O in the postwar period. These two eight–car streamlined trains were the first trains in the eastern U.S. to be equipped with dome cars, the "Strata-Dome". Although the pair were intended as a daytime operation between Chicago and Baltimore by way of Washington the two new trains entered overnight service May 5, 1949.

In the 1950s saw a wave of consolidations as the B&O's passenger services contracted. The Columbian and Ambassador (which served Detroit, Michigan) began joint operation between Washington and Willard, Ohio on January 10, 1954. On December 1, 1957, the Columbian's dining car stopped operating west of Willard. On April 26, 1958, the B&O discontinued all passenger service between Jersey City and Baltimore, Maryland, and thereafter the eastern terminus of the Columbian was Baltimore. At the same time the Columbian and Capitol Limited began joint operation between Washington and Baltimore. On October 26, 1958, this joint operation extended all the way to Willard, ending the independence of both trains. The B&O dropped the Columbian name altogether on April 26, 1964.

When Amtrak took over train service on May 1, 1971, the B&O's combined Capitol Limited – Columbian was discontinued, along with all other B&O long-distance passenger trains. On October 1, 1981, Amtrak's Capitol Limited revived Washington–Chicago service, using the old B&O route between the nation's capital and Pittsburgh. Amtrak service continues to the present day.

== Stations ==
Station	State
New York (Rockefeller Center) (bus)	New York (bus)
New York (Grand Central Terminal) (bus)	New York (bus)
Brooklyn (bus)	New York (bus)
Jersey City, NJ (Communipaw Terminal) (originating station for the train)	New Jersey
Wayne Junction	Pennsylvania
Philadelphia (Chestnut Street Station)	Pennsylvania
Chester	Pennsylvania
Wilmington	Delaware
Baltimore (Mt. Royal Station)	Maryland
Baltimore (Camden Station)	Maryland
Washington Union Station	Washington, D.C.
Martinsburg	West Virginia
Cumberland	Maryland
Connellsville	Pennsylvania
McKeesport	Pennsylvania
Pittsburgh (P&L.E. Station)	Pennsylvania
Garrett	Indiana
South Chicago	Illinois
Chicago (B&O Station)	Illinois
Chicago (Grand Central Station)	Illinois

== Equipment ==
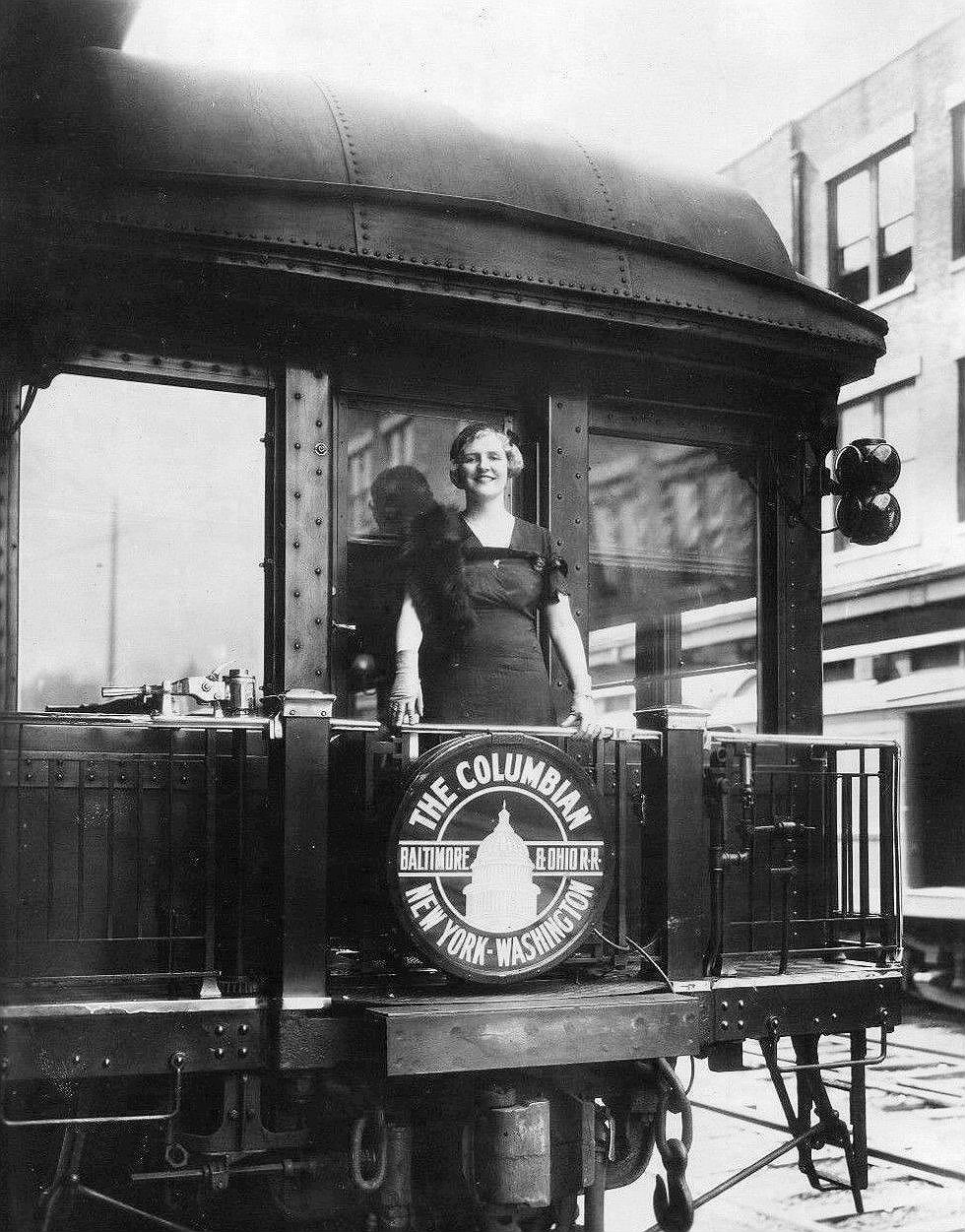
CBS Radio vocalist Harriet Lee aboard the new Columbian in June 1931

In December 1937 the Columbian received equipment originally rebuilt in 1935 for the Royal Blue. These were heavyweight cars given a streamlined appearance. The consist included a baggage-coach, three coaches, a coach-buffet, diner-lunch car, a parlor car which included a drawing room, and a buffet-observation car. The December 1941 re-equipping for long-distance service again involved refurbished Royal Blue equipment, although with long-distance-specific changes such as reducing the number of seats in the coaches. Each consist included a baggage-dormitory-buffet lounge, three coaches (each seating 45), a 46-seat coach with a stewardess' room, a dining car (room for 47), and a buffet-observation car. The B&O removed the buffet-observation cars in 1943. Diesel locomotives began handling the Columbian in 1945.

Pullman-Standard constructed two lightweight consists for the 1949 iteration of the Columbian. Each consist included a baggage-dormitory-coffee shop, four coaches, Strata-Dome dome coach, dining car, and tavern-observation car. Each coach could seat 56; the dining car had seating space for 36. The new Strata-Domes could seat 24 in the dome area (non-revenue) and 40 in revenue seating below, along with two lounges.

First consist

- #1350 Harpers Ferry baggage-dormitory-coffee shop
- #5500 Connellsville coach
- #5502 Gary coach
- #5550 High Dome Strata-Dome dome coach
- #1090 Akron dining car
- #5504 Martinsburg coach
- #5506 New Castle coach
- #3315 Chicago tavern-observation

Second consist

- #1351 Silver Spring baggage-dormitory-coffee shop
- #5501 Cumberland coach
- #5503 La Paz coach
- #5551 Sky Dome Strata-Dome dome coach
- #1091 Pittsburgh dining car
- #5505 McKeesport coach
- #5507 Youngstown coach
- #3316 Washington tavern-observation

The B&O added two slumbercoaches to the Columbian's equipment pool in 1958: the Slumberland (#7700) and Dreamland (#7701). The Columbian lost its tavern-observation cars after it began join operation with the Capitol Limited.
