= El Comedor =

Rock Island 428 El Comedor
- Manufacturer: Pullman-Standard
- Order no.: Lot 6762
- Constructed: 1947
- Diagram: Plan 7517
- Fleet numbers: 428
- Capacity: 36 diners
- Operator: Chicago, Rock Island and Pacific Railroad
- Lines served: Golden Rocket; Golden State

Specifications
- Car length: 85 ft 0 in (25.91 m)
- Track gauge: 4 ft 8 1/2 in (1,435 mm) standard gauge

El Comedor (RI #428) is a former Chicago, Rock Island and Pacific Railroad dining car. It was one of four built in 1947 on Lot 6762 by Pullman-Standard to plan 7517 for the Golden Rocket, "the train that never was." It was subsequently added to the consist of the Golden State along with its brethren, and stayed with the train for many years after. The car is noted for its beautiful copper interior and Mexican theme. The hammered-copper grilles and window trim were designed by the Mexican artist Jesus Torres, of the Hull House, Chicago, Illinois.

El Comedor seats 48 people at 12 tables. For a number of years this car was parked in the LaSalle Street Station in Chicago where it was used as a stationary diner, serving patrons of the station. The car is now smooth-sided in stainless steel, and is in the collection of the Railway Museum of Greater Cincinnati in the Latonia area of Covington, Kentucky.

Comedor is a Spanish language word for diner or a railway dining car.
