= Waltersburg =

Preserved Pullman sleeping car

Waltersburg 12-1 sleeping car
- Manufacturer: Pullman
- Order no.: 4762
- Constructed: 1924
- Refurbished: 1935
- Diagram: Plan 3410; later 3410A
- Capacity: 27 in 12 sections and 1 drawing room
- Operators: Pullman Company for Pennsylvania Railroad

Specifications
- Auxiliaries: 32 Volt
- HVAC: Steam heating; mechanical air-conditioning (from 1935)
- Bogies: Type 242
- Braking system(s): Type UC
- Track gauge: 4 ft 8 1/2 in (1,435 mm)

Waltersburg is a heavyweight Pullman sleeping car named for a city in Western Pennsylvania. The unit was built by the Pullman Company in 1924 as 12-section 1-drawing room heavyweight sleeper (colloquially a “12-1”). The car featured open sections with fold-down upper berths and lower berths made by folding the seats down in each section, and a drawing room — a large enclosed room with three berths and its own toilet and sink.

Waltersburg was one of 71 cars built on Lot 4762, all to Plan 3410. It was fitted with mechanical air-conditioning in June 1935, and redesignaled Plan 3410A.

As a consequence of the Pullman antitrust action, the car was sold to the Pennsylvania Railroad in 1948 as PRR 8968, Waltersburg, and leased back to Pullman. It was renamed J. Finley Wilson in December 1952. The Pullman lease was terminated in May 1957 and subsequently rebuilt as a PRR parlor car. The unit went to the Long Island Rail Road around 1957, where it was operated as private commuter club car.

Upon retirement the car was purchased and brought to Cincinnati, Ohio. It was later donated to the Railway Museum of Greater Cincinnati in Covington, Kentucky, where it now awaits restoration.
