= Liberty Limited =

Overview
- Predecessor: Washington–Broadway Limited
- First service: September 27, 1925; 100 years ago
- Last service: October 27, 1957; 68 years ago
- Successor: General
- Former operator: Pennsylvania Railroad (1938–1957)

Route
- Train numbers: 58 (Chicago to Washington; 59 (Washington to Chicago)

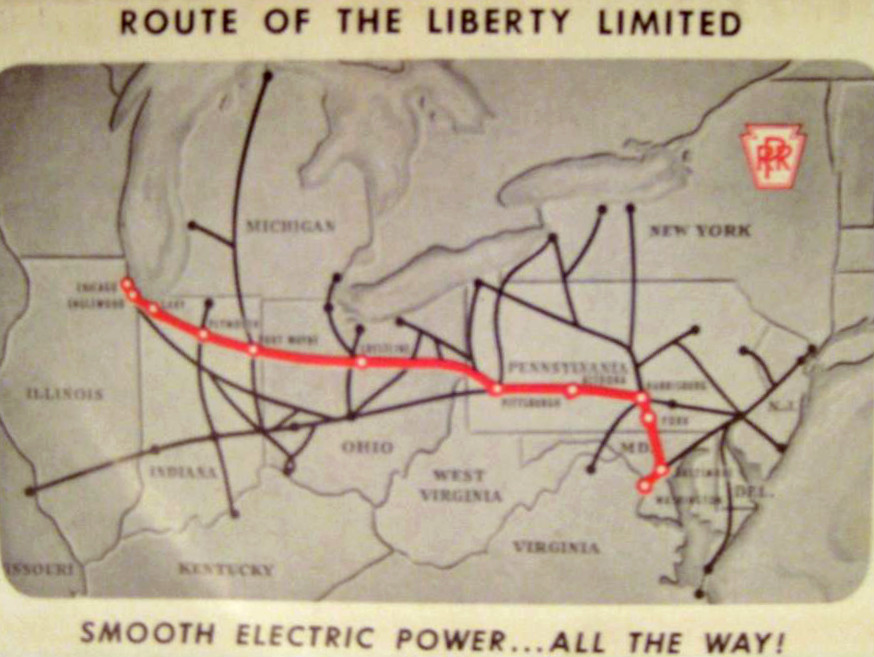
Liberty Limited route map

The Liberty Limited was a named train on the Pennsylvania Railroad. It ran from Washington D.C. to Chicago, Illinois, through Baltimore, Harrisburg and Pittsburgh. It began running on September 27, 1925, as a replacement for the Washington–Broadway Limited, which had been introduced in 1923. It originally was scheduled to complete its route in 19 hours.

In June 1938 it became one of the original trains making up the Pennsylvania Railroad's "Fleet of Modernism", using modern streamlined lightweight equipment, along with the General, the Broadway Limited and the Spirit of St. Louis. Beside streamlining, its travel time was reduced to 16 hours 25 mins; 30 mins slower than B&O's premier train the Royal Blue. The train consisted of one lounge Car (Drawing-room, three Double Bedrooms, Buffet), a 14 sections heavyweight Pullman sleeper, a 12-5 and a 10-5 lightweight Pullman sleeper, one dining car, one coach with reclining seat which was regularly assigned, an observation car with two master bedrooms, one double bedroom and a buffet lounge. Prime power was PRR K4s, PRR S1 #6100, T1s and diesel engines. Its primary competition were the Baltimore & Ohio's Royal Blue and Capitol Limited.

It last ran on October 27, 1957, after which its equipment was moved to the Chicago–New York General, which also picked up a leg connecting from Harrisburg to Washington, D.C.

== Consist ==
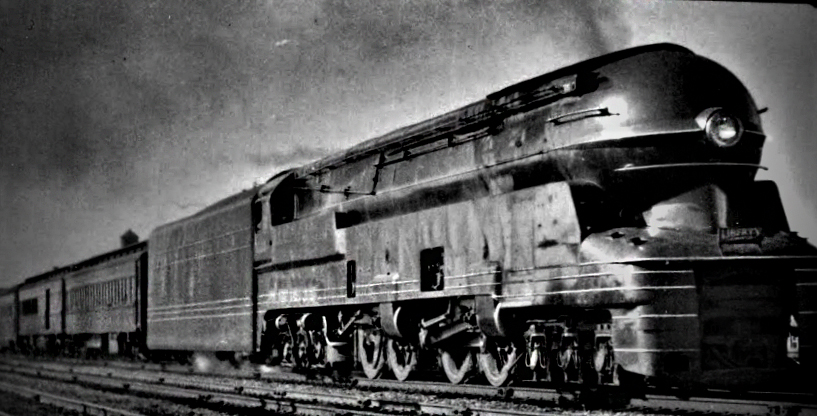
PRR S1 #6100 was seen hauling the Liberty Limited eastbound at New Freedom, PA in April 1941.

- PRR S1 6100 6-4-4-6 Duplex Steam Engine or PRR K4s 4-6-2 Steam Engine
- Baggage-Lounge Car
- 3 Double Bedrooms, 1 Drawing Room lounge Car
- 14 Sections Heavyweight Sleeper
- 12 Duplex Single room, 5 Double Bedroom Lightweight Sleeper
- 10 Roomette, 5 Double Bedroom Lightweight Sleeper
- Dining Car
- Reclining Coach
- 2 Master Bedroom,1 Double Bedroom Buffet Lounge Observation Car

== Army-Navy Liberty Limited ==
In late 2005, Bennet and Vivian Levin organized a commemorative private train dubbed Liberty Limited to take 88 veterans from the Washington Walter Reed Army Medical Center and the Bethesda Naval Hospital to the annual Army-Navy football game in Philadelphia on December 3, 2005. The train was created from Levin's historic private stock and joined with private cars from other supporters. The Army-Navy Liberty Limited run was repeated in later years (2006, 2010).

A 2005 Ronnie Polaneczky, Liberty Limited, Philadelphia Daily News story was reprinted in 2015 as a photo blog by Michael Froio. The Army-Navy commemorative train runs were the subject of a 2017 podcast interview with Bennet Levin on YouTube: Honoring Our Veterans: The Story of the Liberty Limited Special. The 2005 Polaneczky story has been the source of a 'the media never tells' fake news campaign, where the 2005 article is repeated but the game date is changed to a recent year.

== Surviving Equipment ==
=== Fleet Of Modernism (1938) ===
- PS Buffet Lounge Observation Plan 4080, #8114 FEDERAL VIEW Located inside the Trackside Grille (Closed) Quaker Square, Akron, OH.
