= General (train) =

Overview
- Status: Discontinued
- Locale: Mid-West/Mid-Atlantic States
- First service: 1937
- Last service: December 12, 1967
- Successor: Broadway Limited
- Former operator(s): Pennsylvania Railroad (1937–1967)

Route
- Termini: New York City and Washington, D.C. Chicago
- Distance travelled: 907.7 miles (1,460.8 km) (New York-Chicago)
- Service frequency: Daily
- Train number(s): 48 (Chicago to New York); 49 (New York to Chicago)

On-board services
- Seating arrangements: Reclining seat coach (1957)
- Sleeping arrangements: Roomettes, duplex rooms, double bedrooms
- Catering facilities: Dining car
- Observation facilities: Observation lounge coach

The General (train numbers 48 and 49) was the Pennsylvania Railroad's (PRR) number two train between New York City and Chicago. Only marginally slower than the Broadway Limited, it had no extra fare. For a time before World War II, the train carried more passengers than the Broadway Limited and taking the passengers away from the New York Central Railroad's 20th Century Limited.

The General was inaugurated in 1937, and carried coaches and Pullmans. It received some new lightweight equipment in 1938 as part of the fleet of modernism, but it was mostly heavyweight until 1940. It was the only "Fleet of Modernism" train to be streamlined without an observation car. It lost its coaches but still had a passenger-baggage car attached to its consist when the Advance General was inaugurated in 1940. The General became an All-Pullman train in April 1942. It was re-equipped with lightweight sleeping cars from both the pre-war Broadway, and new cars from post-war orders in 1948. At this time, it also carried the Broadway's pre-war View series observation cars. In 1951 the General lost its all-Pullman status when it was combined with the all-coach Trail Blazer for non-peak travel periods only. In 1952 this consolidation became permanent, and by 1960, the Trail Blazer name was dropped.

In the late 1950s, the General also carried coaches and sleepers from Washington, DC, to Chicago via Harrisburg, when the PRR discontinued its Washington-Chicago Liberty Limited train.

In 1967 the General merged with the Broadway Limited when that train lost its numbers and all-Pullman status.

== Motive Power ==
Here is a list of motive power used on the General:

- PRR GG1 4-6-0+0-6-4 electric locomotive (1937-1967, East of Harrisburg, electrified region)
- PRR K4s 4-6-2 type steam locomotive (1937-1948)
- PRR S1 6-4-4-6 type steam locomotive (1941-1946)
- PRR T1 4-4-4-4 type steam locomotive (1942-1948)
- ALCO PA passenger diesel electric locomotive (1948-1952)
- BLW DR-6 passenger diesel electric locomotive (1948-1953)
- EMD E8 passenger diesel electric locomotive (1948-1967)

== Surviving Equipment ==
=== Fleet Of Modernism (1938) ===
- PS 13-Double Bedroom Plan 4071A #8007 PHILADELPHIA COUNTY Originally preserved at the Indiana Transportation Museum in Noblesville, IN, It was moved to a private siding in Santa Claus, IN.

== Sources ==
- Wayner, Robert J., ed. (1972). Car Names, Numbers and Consists. New York: Wayner Publications. OCLC 8848690.
