= Dining car =

Railroad passenger car that serves meals

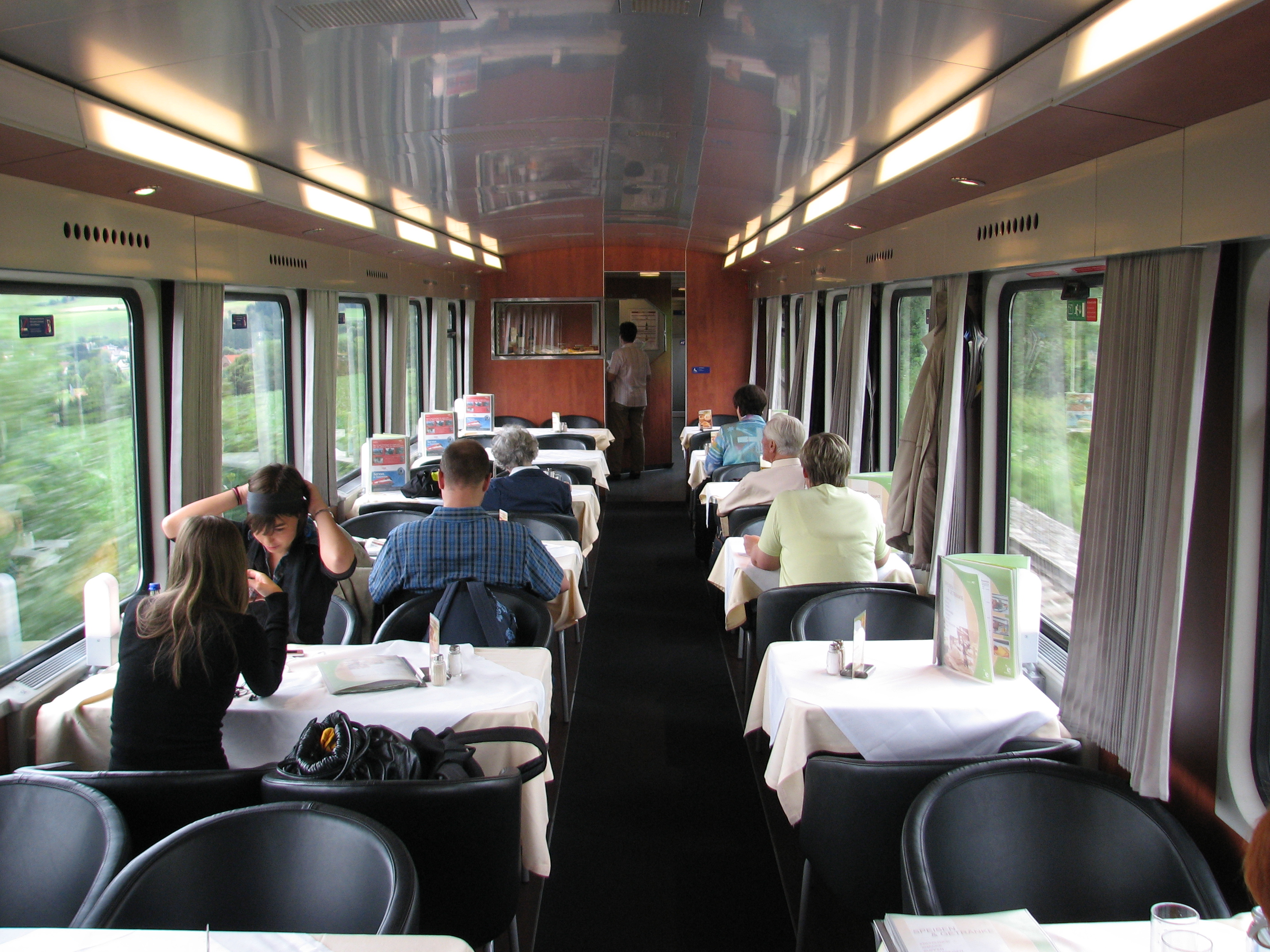
A dining car on an Austrian inter-city train in 2008

A dining car (American English) or a restaurant car (British English), also a diner, is a passenger railroad car that serves meals in the manner of a full-service, sit-down restaurant.

These cars provide the highest level of service of any railroad food service car, typically employing multiple servers and kitchen staff members. Consequently, they are the most expensive to operate. It is distinct from other railroad food service cars that do not duplicate the full-service restaurant experience, such as buffet cars, cars in which one purchases food from a walk-up counter to be consumed either within the car or elsewhere in the train. Grill cars, in which customers sit on stools at a counter and purchase and consume food cooked on a grill behind the counter are generally considered to be an "intermediate" type of dining car.

== History ==
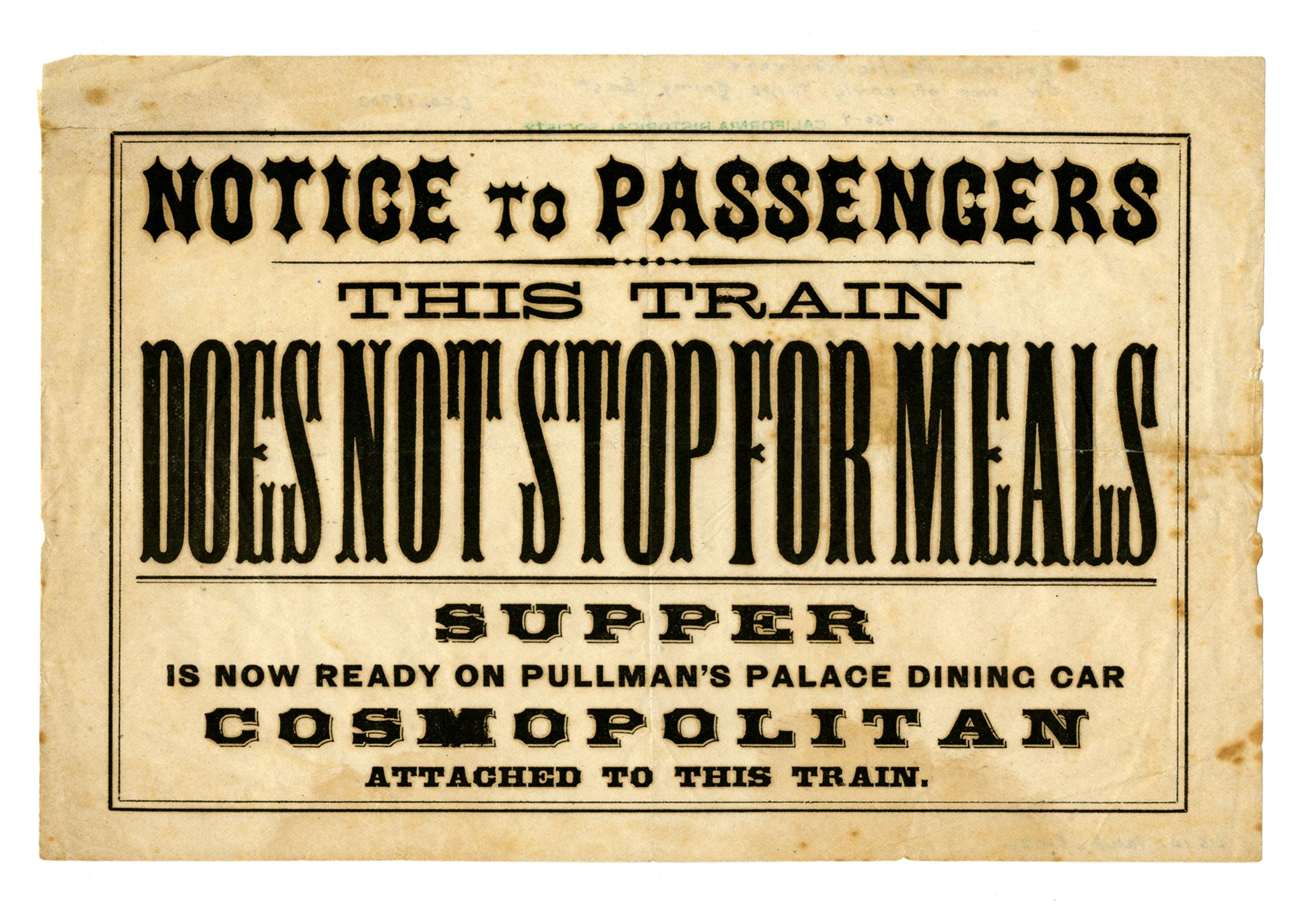
Notice from the Central Pacific Railroad, ca. 1870

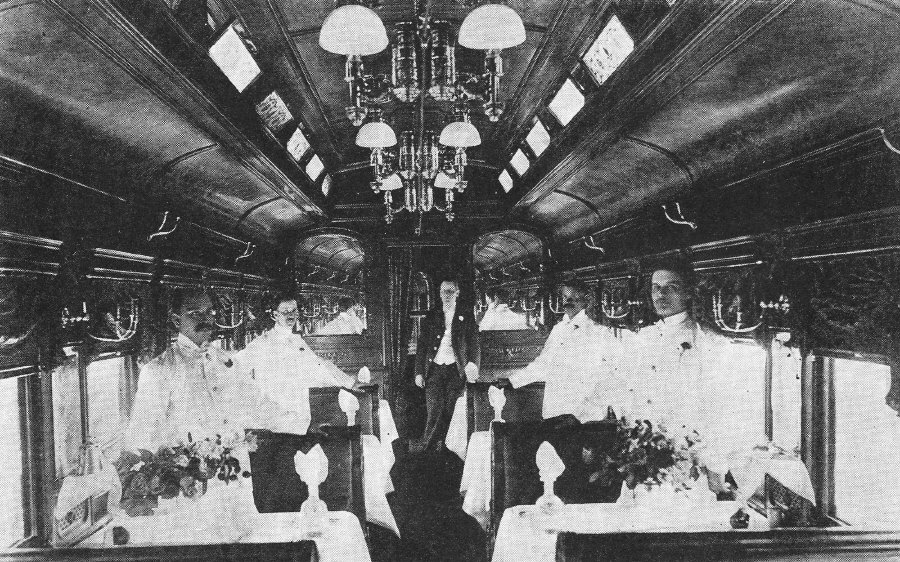
Dining car Queen on the B&O Royal Blue in 1895

=== United States ===
Before dining cars in passenger trains were common in the United States, a rail passenger's option for meal service in transit was to patronize one of the roadhouses often located near the railroad's "water stops". Fare typically consisted of rancid meat, cold beans, and old coffee. Such poor conditions discouraged some from making the journey.

Most railroads began offering meal service on trains even before the First transcontinental railroad. By the mid-1880s, dedicated dining cars were a normal part of long-distance trains from Chicago to points west, save those of the Santa Fe Railway, which relied on America's first interstate network of restaurants to feed passengers en route. The "Harvey Houses", located strategically along the line, served top-quality meals to railroad patrons during water stops and other planned layovers and were favored over in-transit facilities for all trains operating west of Kansas City.

As competition among railroads intensified, dining car service was taken to new levels. When the Santa Fe unveiled its new Pleasure Dome lounge cars in 1951, the railroad introduced the travelling public to the Turquoise Room, promoted as "The only private dining room in the world on rails." The room accommodated 12 guests, and could be reserved anytime for private dinner or cocktail parties, or other special functions. The room was often used by celebrities and dignitaries traveling on the Super Chief.

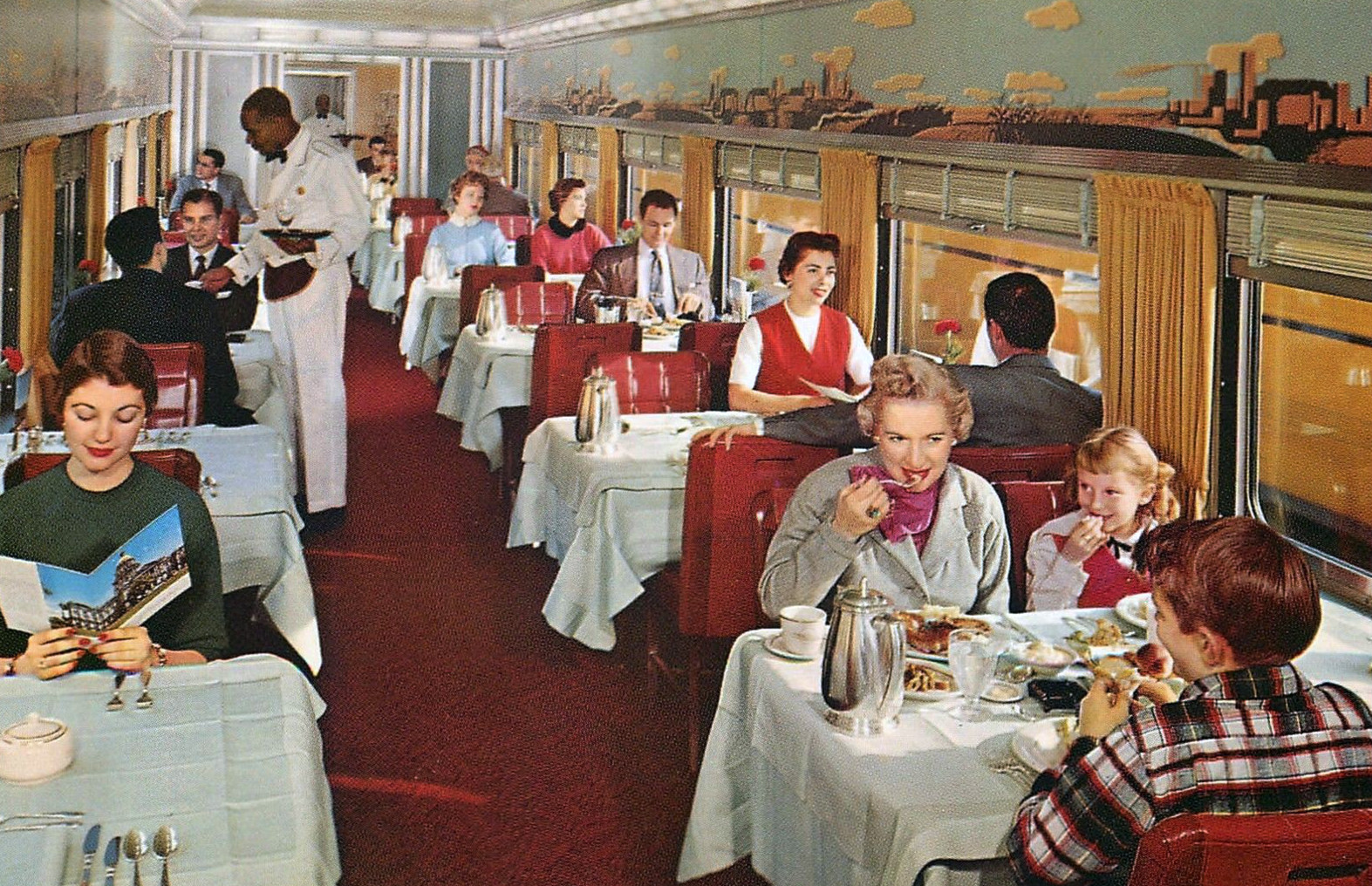
A dining car on the Union Pacific's City of Denver, ca. 1950s.

Edwin Kachel was a steward for more than twenty-five years in the Dining-Car Department of the Great Northern Railway. He said that "on a dining car, three elements can be considered -- the equipment, the employee, then passenger." In other words, "the whole is constituted by two-thirds of human parts." As cross-country train travel became more commonplace, passengers began to expect high-quality food to be served at the meals on board. The level of meal service on trains in the 1920s and 1930s rivaled that of high-end restaurants and clubs.

=== United Kingdom ===
They were first introduced in England on 1 November 1879 by the Great Northern Railway Company on services between Leeds and London. A Pullman car was attached to the train for the purpose.

As of 2018, Great Western Railway is the only UK train company to provide a full dining Pullman service on selected trains to the West Country & Wales.

== Food ==
Elegance is one of the main words used to describe the concept of dining on a train. Use of fresh ingredients was encouraged whenever possible. Some of the dishes prepared by chefs were: Braised Duck Cumberland, Hungarian Beef Goulash with Potato Dumplings, Lobster Americaine, Mountain Trout Au Bleu, Curry of Lamb Madras, Scalloped Brussels Sprouts, Pecan and Orange Sticks and Pennepicure Pie to name a few items.

The Christmas menu for the Chicago, Milwaukee & St. Paul Railway in 1882 listed the following items: Hunter's Soup, Salmon with Hollandaise Sauce, Boned Pheasant in Aspic Jelly, Chicken Salad, Salmis Prairie Chicken, Oyster Patties, Rice Croquette, Roast Beef, English Ribs of Beef, Turkey with Cranberry Sauce, Stuffed Suckling Pig with Applesauce, Antelope Steak with Currant Jelly, potatoes, green peas, tomatoes, sweet potatoes, Mince Pie, Plum Pudding, Cake, ice cream, fruits and coffee.

== Configuration ==
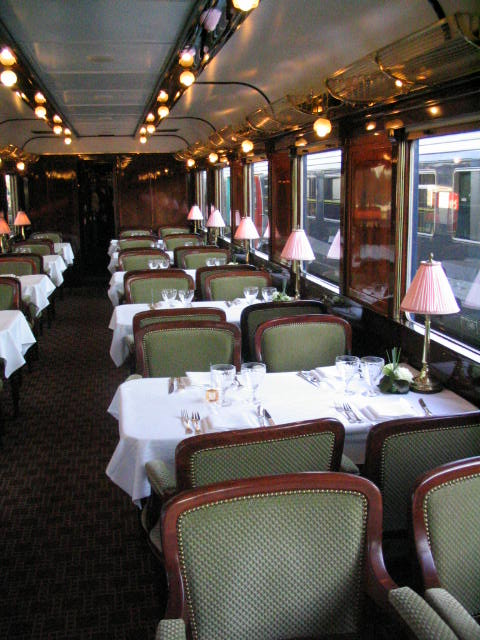
Pullman Dining Car

In one of the most common dining car configurations, one end of the car contains a galley (with an aisle next to it so that passengers can pass through the car to the rest of the train), and the other end has table or booth seating on either side of a center aisle.

Trains with high demand for dining car services sometimes feature "double-unit dining cars" consisting of two adjacent cars functioning to some extent as a single entity, generally with one car containing a galley as well as table or booth seating and the other car containing table or booth seating only.

In the dining cars of Amtrak's modern bilevel Superliner trains, booth seating on either side of a center aisle occupies almost the entire upper level, with a galley below; food is sent to the upper level on a dumbwaiter.

Dining cars enhance the familiar restaurant experience with the unique visual entertainment of the ever-changing view. While dining cars are less common today than in the past (having been supplemented or in some cases replaced altogether by other types of food-service cars), they still play a significant role in passenger railroading, especially on medium- and long-distance trains.

Today, a number of tourist-oriented railroads offer dinner excursions to capitalize on the public's fascination with the dining car experience.

The U76/U70 tram line between the German cities of Düsseldorf and Krefeld offers a Bistrowagen ("dining car" in German), where passengers can order drinks and snacks. That practice comes from the early 20th century, when interurban trams conveyed a dining car. Despite the introduction of modern tram units, four trams still have a Bistrowagen and operate every weekday.

== Gallery ==
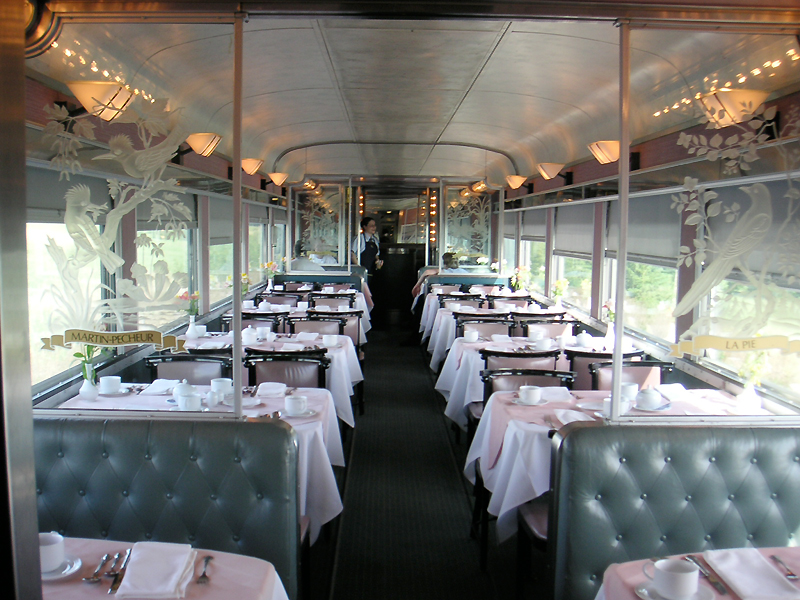
The dining car of the Via Rail Canadian prepared for meal service

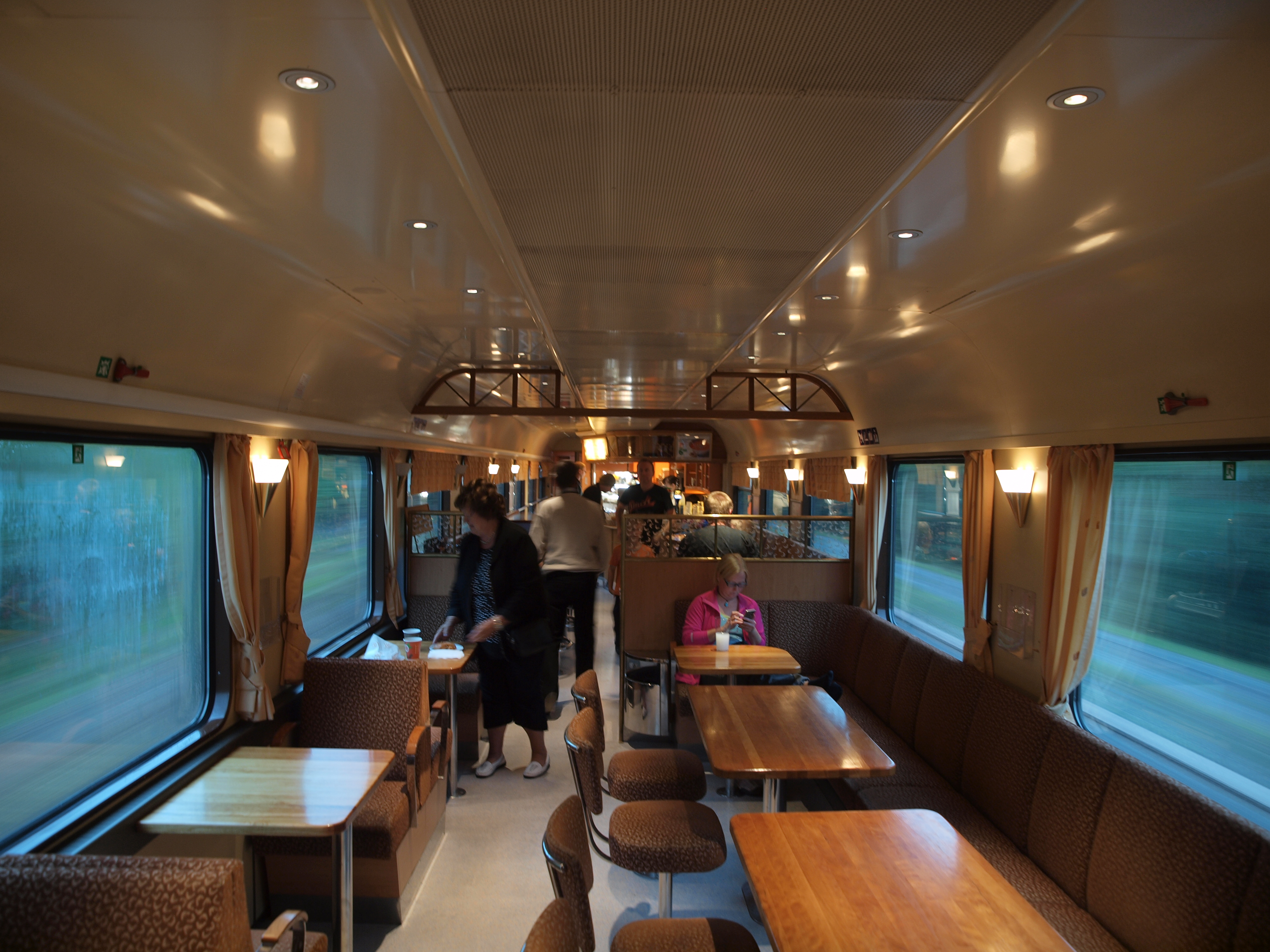
A dining car aboard a Finnish long-distance train from Helsinki, Uusimaa to Kolari, Lapland, photographed somewhere between Helsinki and Tampere, Pirkanmaa in 2015

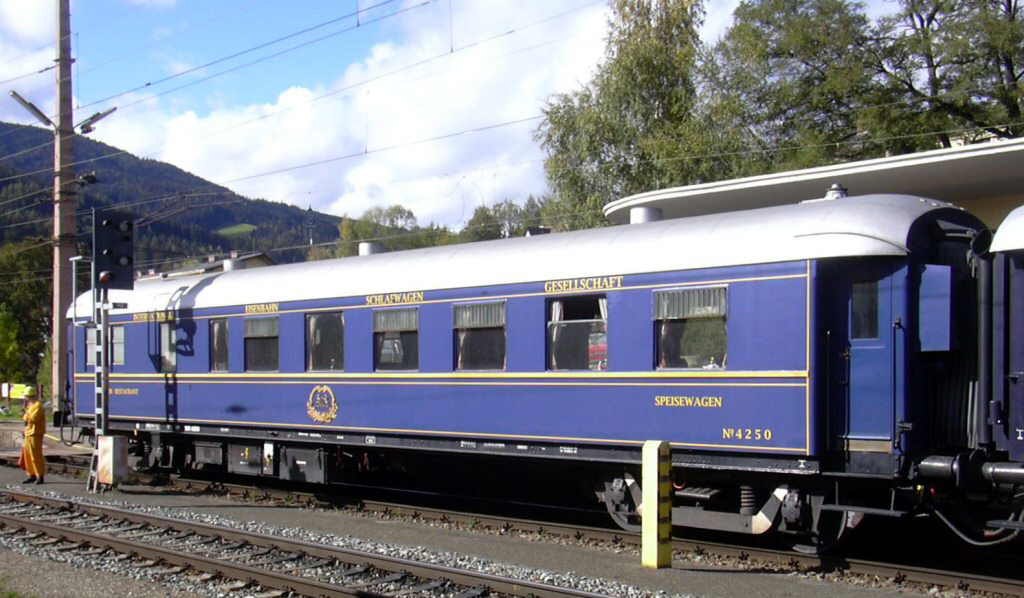
Wagons-Lits dining car in Austria in 2003

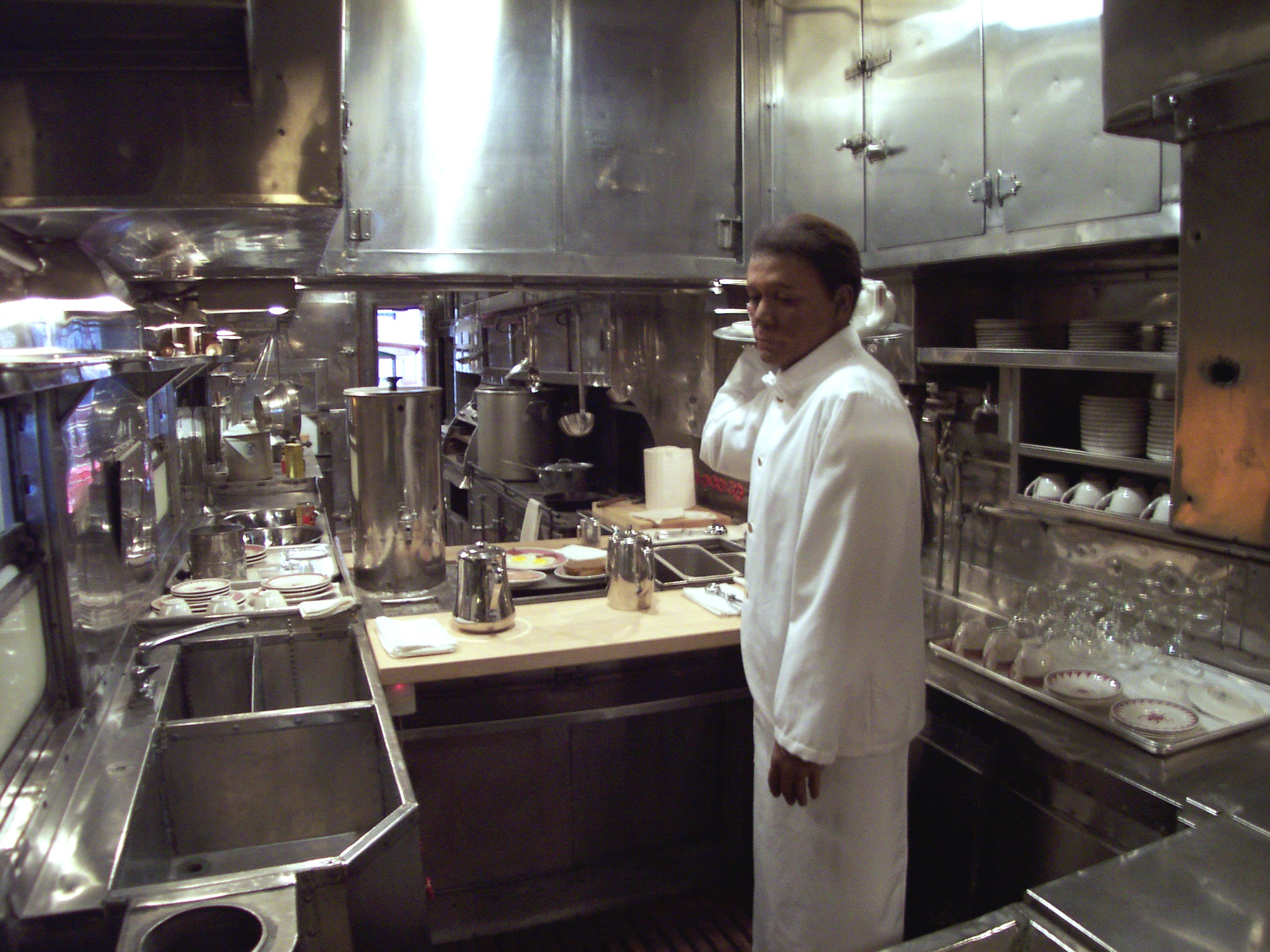
The pantry aboard former Santa Fe dining car #1474, the Cochiti. Over a million meals were served in the car, which remained in service through the late 1960s.

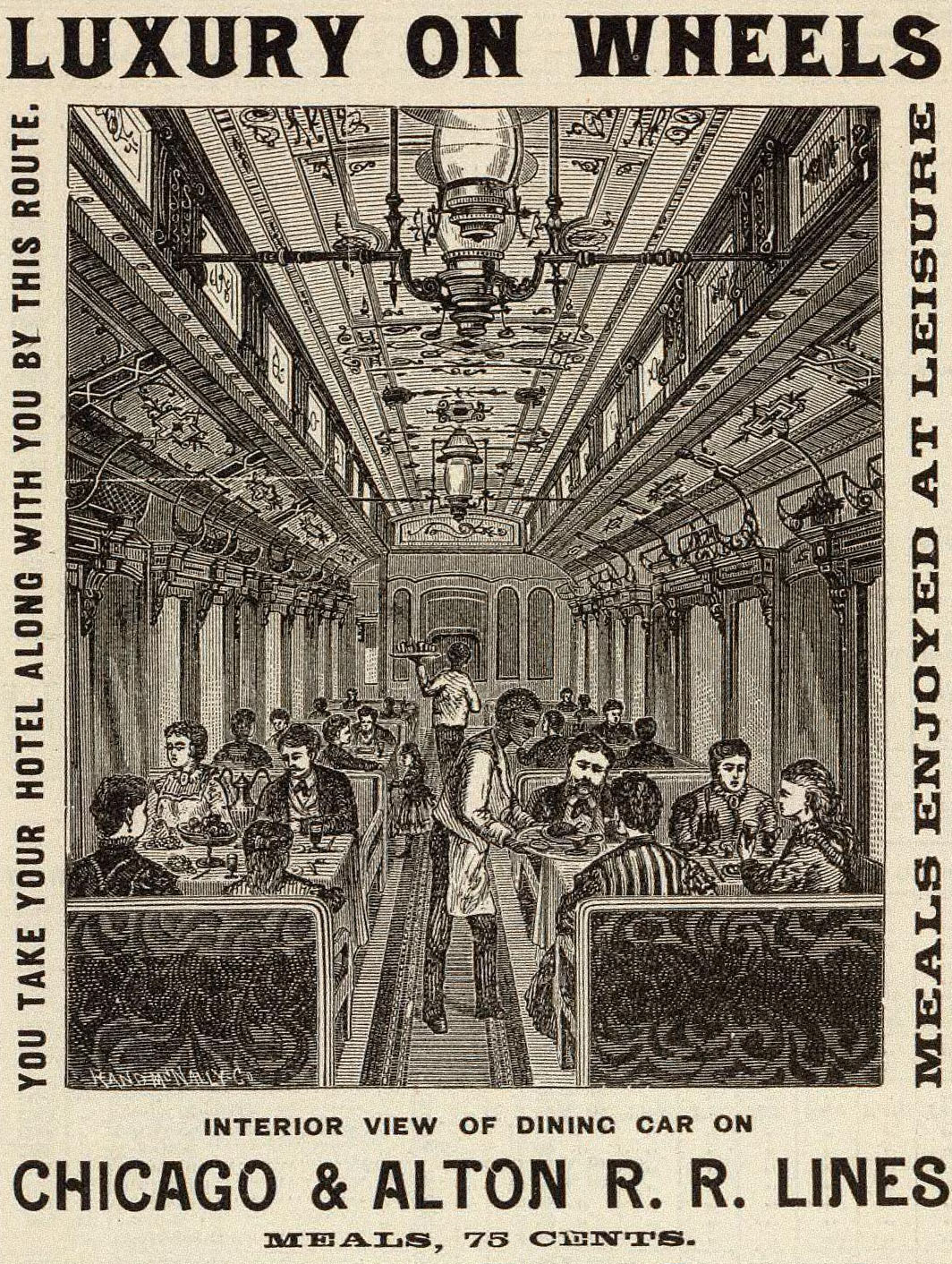
An 1880s print advertisement extolling the virtues of meal service aboard the Chicago and Alton Railroad

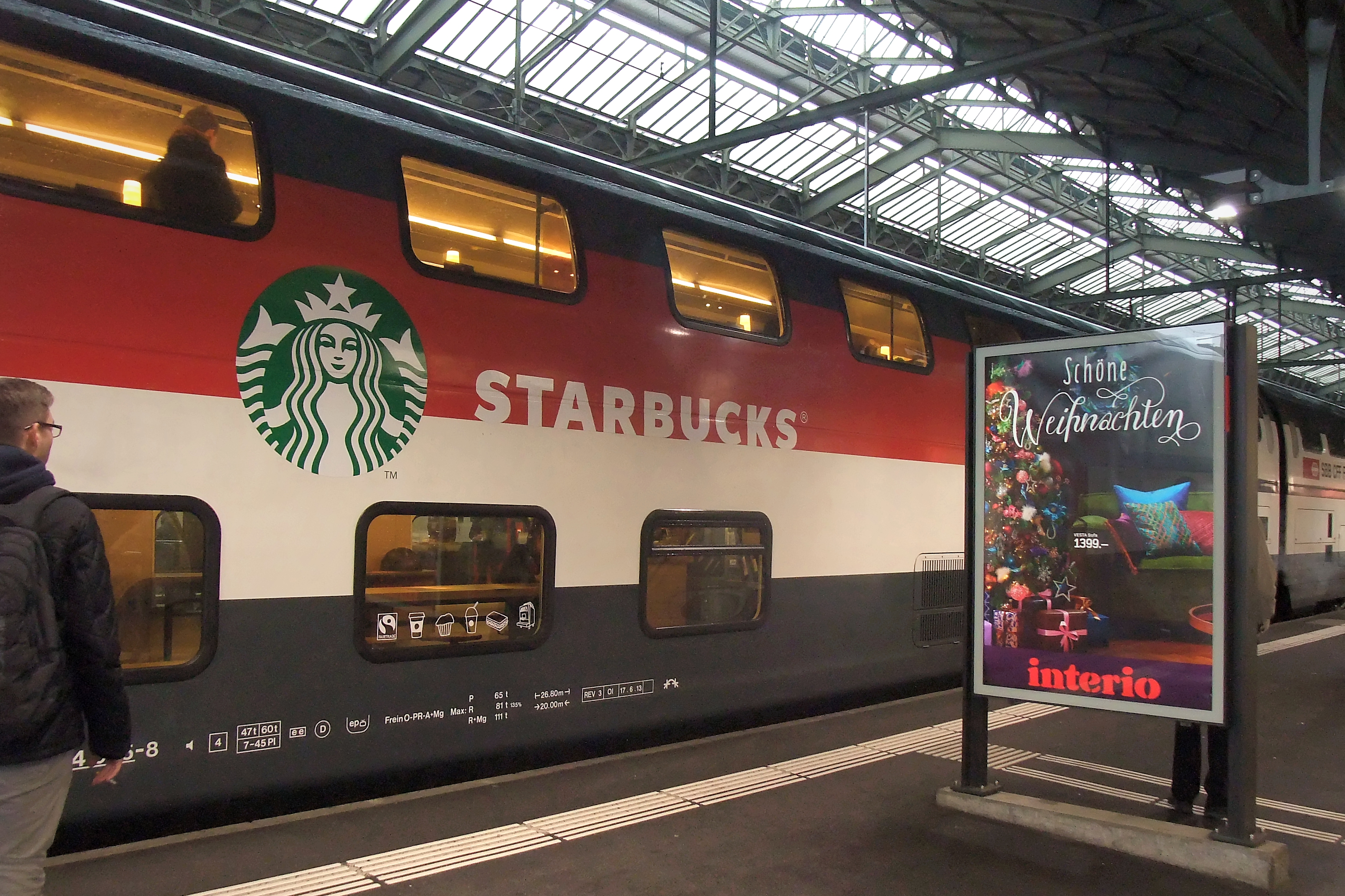
Swiss Federal Railways Starbucks double-deck dining car

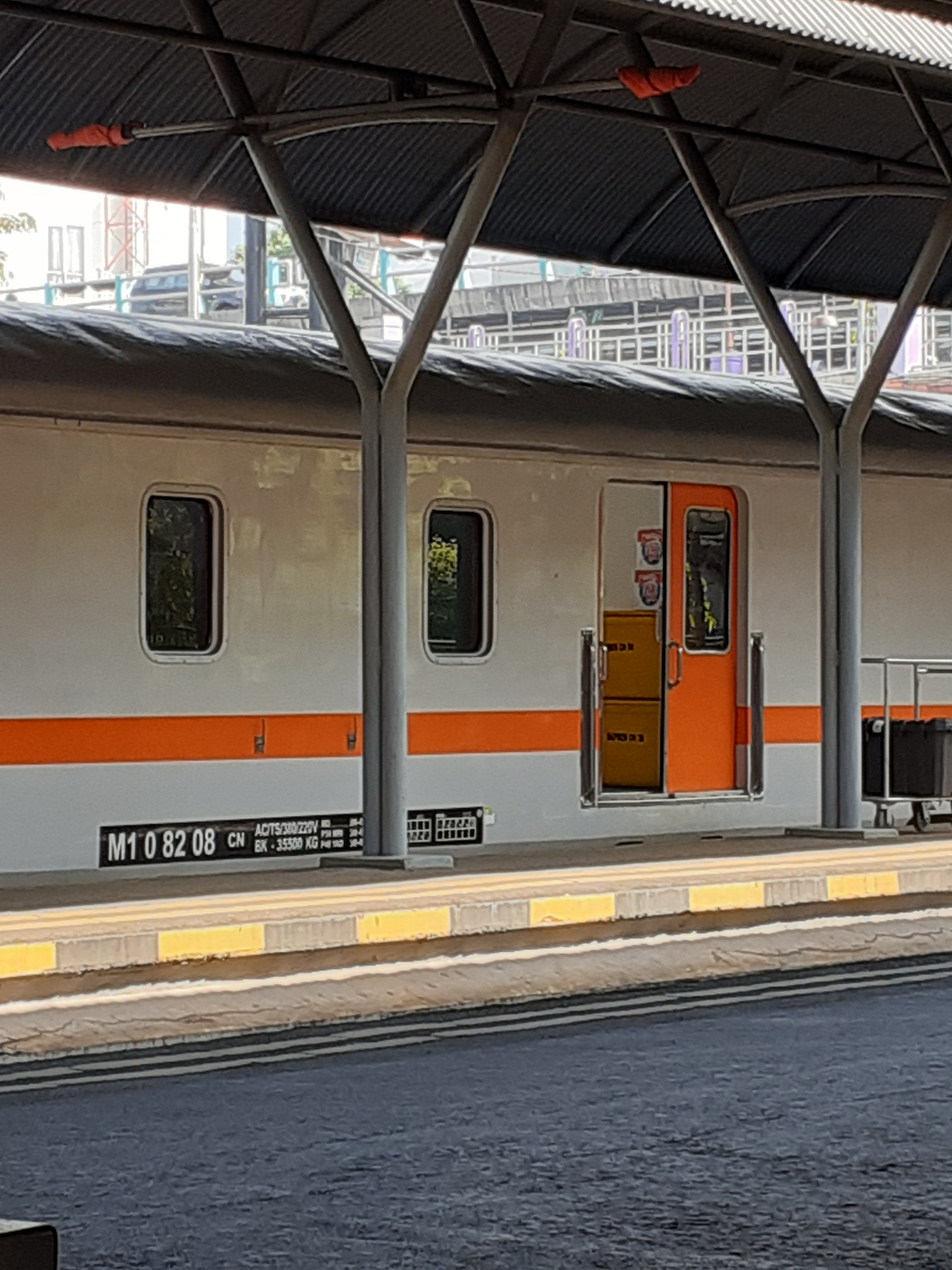
Kereta Api Indonesia's executive class dining car numbered M1 0 82 08. This dining car was modified in mid 2010-s from a 1982 built 2nd class car.

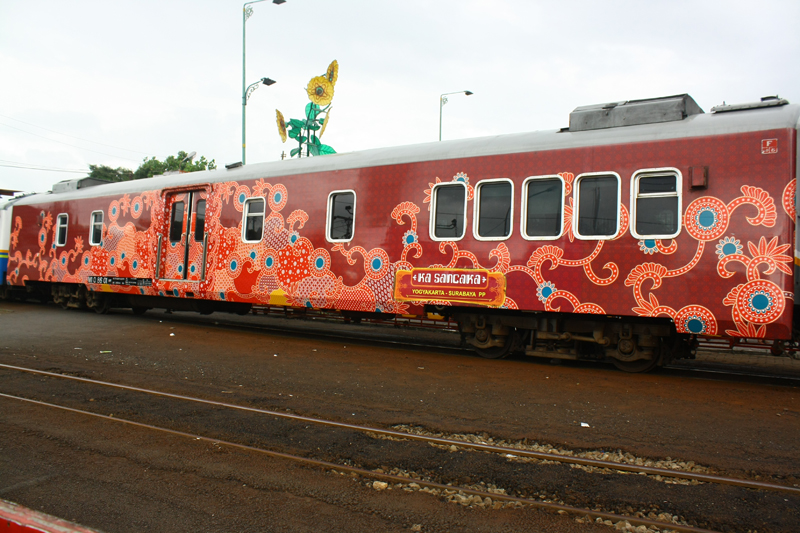
Kereta Api Indonesia's special dining car, M1 0 86 01 with Maduranese batik special paint scheme. It was modified in mid 2010-s from a 1986 built 3rd class car.

== See also ==
- Buffet car
- Dining aboard the Super Chief
- El Comedor
- Fred Harvey Company
- Lists of named passenger trains
- Napa Valley Wine Train
- Seaboard Air Line 6113
- Troop sleeper (Troop kitchen)
- Diners styled after railway dining cars
