= Wrightwood station (Metra) =

Commuter rail station in Chicago, Illinois

Wrightwood

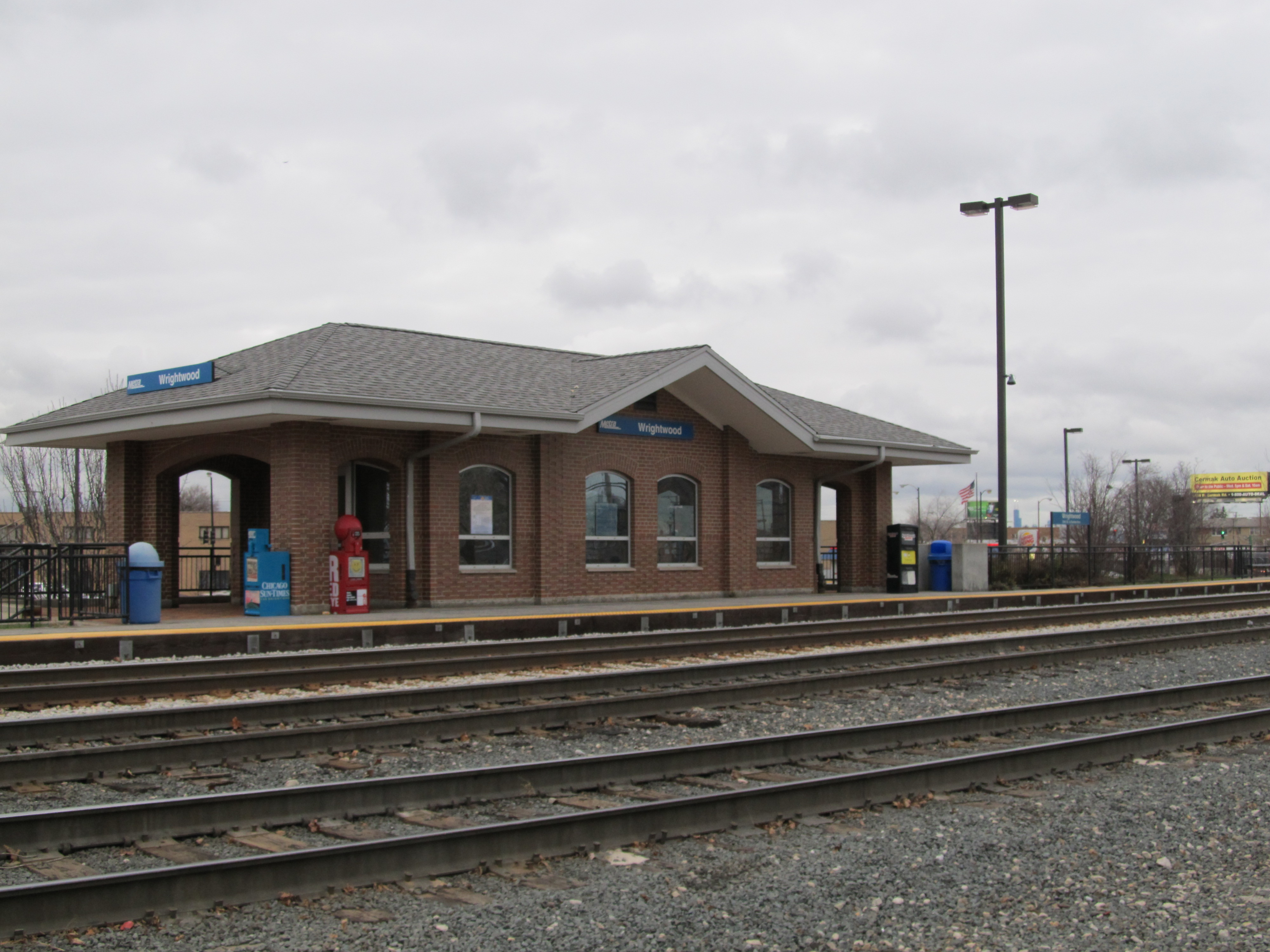

General information
- Location: 79th Street & West Columbus Avenue; Chicago, Illinois
- Coordinates: 41.7489°N 87.7036°W
- Owner: Metra
- Platforms: 1 side platform
- Tracks: 4
- Connections: CTA Buses

Construction
- Parking: Yes; Vending
- Accessible: Yes

Other information
- Fare zone: 2

History
- Opened: 1984
- Former names: Landers

Passengers
- 2018: 261 (average weekday) ▲15.5%
- Rank: 154 out of 236

Services
Preceding station	Metra	Following station
Ashburn toward Manhattan	SouthWest Service	Union Station Terminus
Future services
Preceding station	Metra	Following station
Ashburn toward Manhattan	SouthWest Service	35th Street toward LaSalle
Former services
Preceding station	Metra	Following station
Ashburn toward Manhattan	SouthWest Service	Western Avenue closed 1984 toward Union Station
Preceding station	Norfolk and Western Railway	Following station
Oak Lawn toward Orland Park	Orland Park Cannonball	Western Avenue toward Chicago
Preceding station	Wabash Railroad	Following station
Oak Lawn toward Kansas City	Main Line	Western Avenue toward Chicago
Track layout
Location

Wrightwood is a station on Metra's SouthWest Service in Wrightwood neighborhood in Chicago, Illinois. The station is 11.5 miles (18.5 km) away from Chicago Union Station, the northern terminus of the line. In Metra's zone-based fare system, Wrightwood is in zone 2. As of 2018, Wrightwood is the 154th busiest of Metra's 236 non-downtown stations, with an average of 261 weekday boardings. There is an unstaffed shelter and across from the station is Norfolk Southern's Landers Yard.

As of February 15, 2024, Wrightwood is served by 27 trains (14 inbound, 13 outbound) on weekdays. Saturday service is currently suspended.

== Bus Connections ==
- 52A South Kedzie
- 79 79th
