= Palos Heights station =

Commuter rail station in Palos Heights, Illinois

Palos Heights

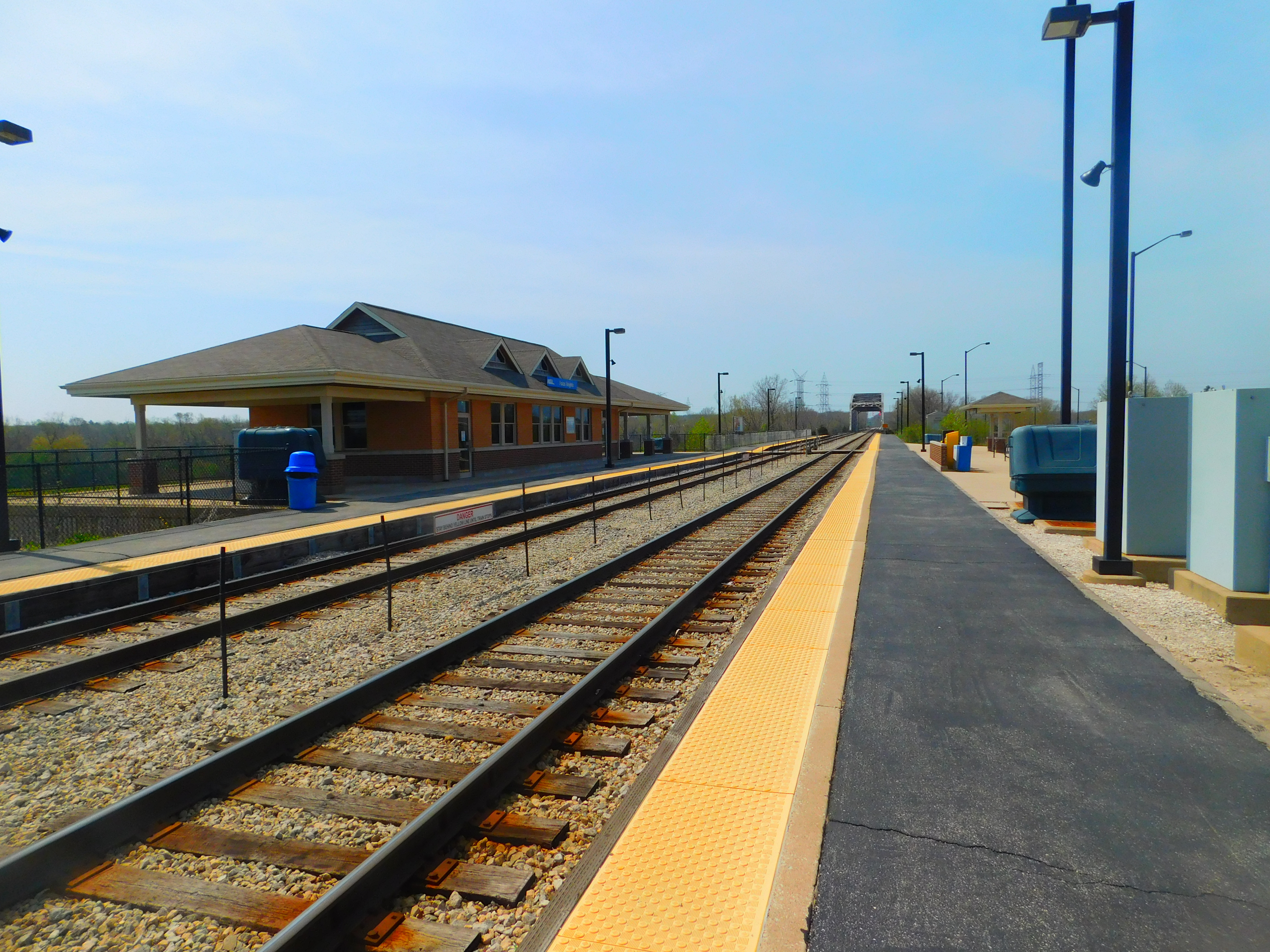
- Palos Heights station in April 2016

General information
- Location: 11451 Southwest Highway; Palos Heights, Illinois
- Coordinates: 41.6820°N 87.8073°W
- Owner: Metra
- Platforms: 2 side platforms
- Tracks: 2
- Connections: Pace Buses

Construction
- Accessible: Yes

Other information
- Fare zone: 3

History
- Opened: 2004

Passengers
- 2018: 232 (average weekday) ▼2.5%
- Rank: 160 out of 236

Services
Preceding station	Metra	Following station
Palos Park toward Manhattan	SouthWest Service	Worth toward Union Station
Former services
Preceding station	Norfolk and Western Railway	Following station
Palos Park toward Orland Park	Orland Park Cannonball	Worth toward Chicago
Preceding station	Wabash Railroad	Following station
Palos Park toward Kansas City	Main Line	Worth toward Chicago
Track layout
Location

Palos Heights is a station on Metra's SouthWest Service in Palos Heights, Illinois. The station is 18.6 miles (29.9 km) away from Chicago Union Station, the northern terminus of the line. The station opened in 2004. In Metra's zone-based fare system, Palos Heights is in zone 3. As of 2018, Palos Heights is the 160th busiest of Metra's 236 non-downtown stations, with an average of 232 weekday boardings.

As of February 15, 2024, Palos Heights is served by 28 trains (14 in each direction) on weekdays. Saturday service is currently suspended.
