= Chicago Ridge station =

Commuter rail station in Chicago Ridge, Illinois

Chicago Ridge

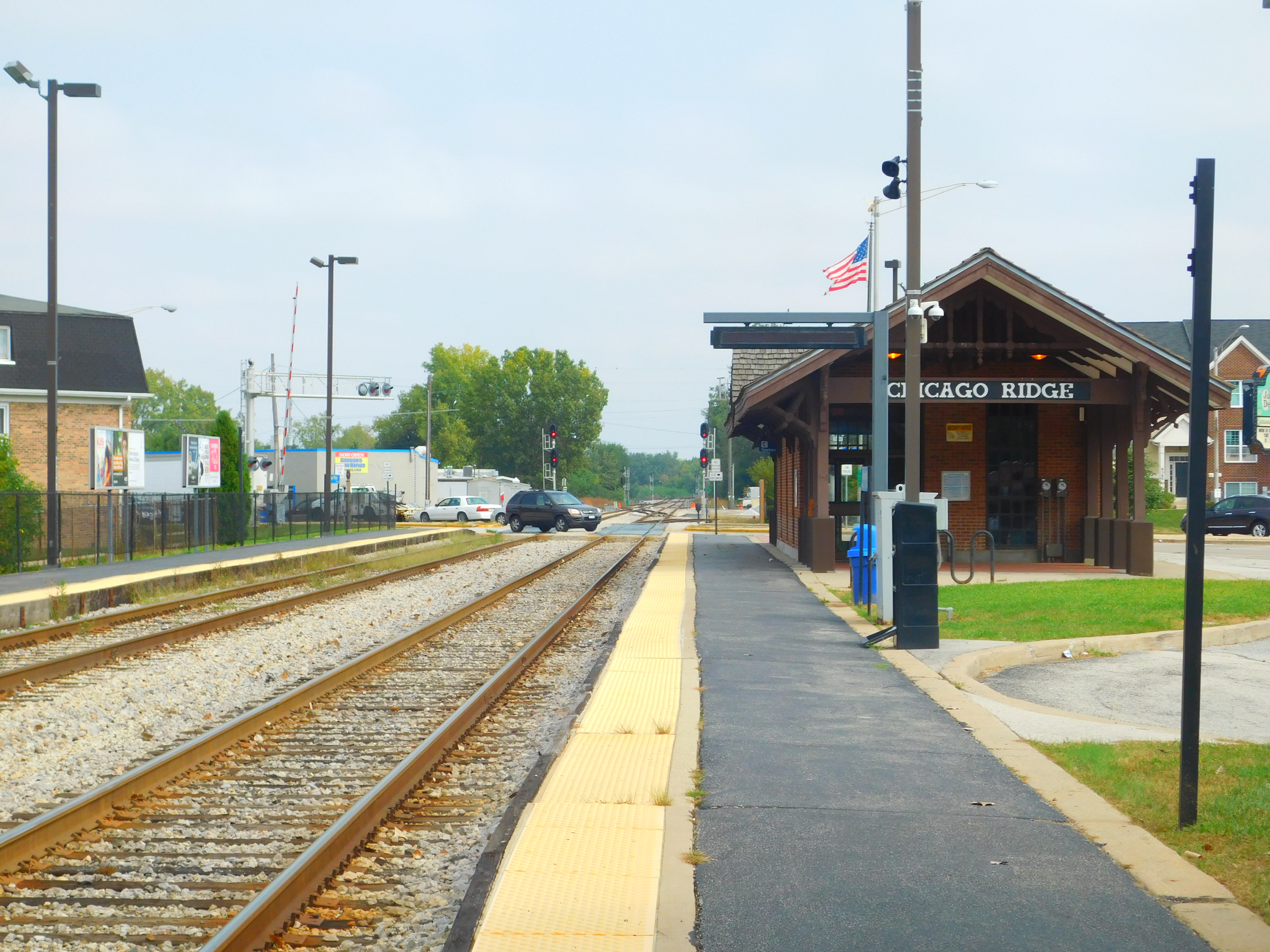
- Chicago Ridge station in September 2016

General information
- Location: 103rd Street & Ridgeland; Chicago Ridge, Illinois
- Coordinates: 41.7034°N 87.7803°W
- Owner: Metra
- Platforms: 2 side platforms
- Tracks: 2
- Connections: Pace Buses

Construction
- Accessible: Yes

Other information
- Fare zone: 3

History
- Opened: 1991

Passengers
- 2018: 372 (average weekday) ▲9.7%
- Rank: 127 out of 236

Services
Preceding station	Metra	Following station
Worth toward Manhattan	SouthWest Service	Oak Lawn Patriot toward Union Station
Former services
Preceding station	Norfolk and Western Railway	Following station
Worth toward Orland Park	Orland Park Cannonball	Oak Lawn toward Chicago
Preceding station	Wabash Railroad	Following station
Worth toward Kansas City	Main Line	Oak Lawn toward Chicago
Track layout
Location

Chicago Ridge is a station on Metra's SouthWest Service in Chicago Ridge, Illinois. The station is 16.6 miles (26.7 km) away from Chicago Union Station, the northern terminus of the line. In Metra's zone-based fare system, Chicago Ridge is in zone 3. As of 2018, Chicago Ridge is the 127th busiest of Metra's 236 non-downtown stations, with an average of 372 weekday boardings.

As of February 15, 2024, Chicago Ridge is served by 28 trains (14 in each direction) on weekdays. Saturday service is currently suspended.

The station is located just north of the Village Hall and Police Station on Ridgeland Avenue between Washington Avenue and 105th Street, and west of the B&OCT/IHB Railroad's crossing at grade and the Stony Creek Golf Course. Parking is available not only at the station, but behind the Police Station, along Birmingham Street, Oxford Avenue, and north of the tracks at the corner of Ridgeland Avenue and 103rd Street.

== Bus connections ==
"Route 384 – Narragansett - Ridgeland". PaceBus.com. Chicago: Pace Suburban Bus Service.
