= 179th Street/Orland Park station =

Commuter rail station in Orland Park, Illinois

179th Street/Orland Park

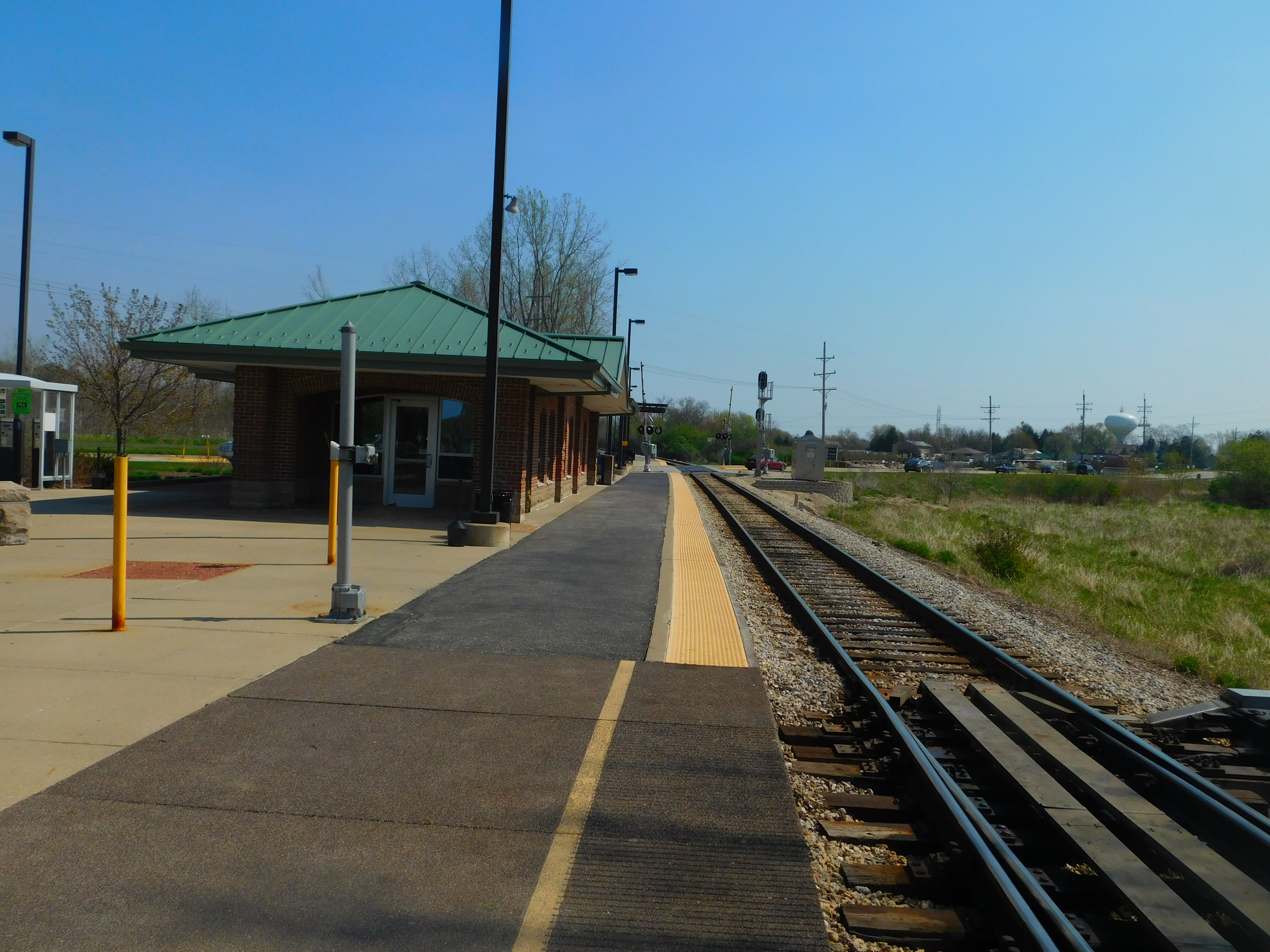
- 179th Street station in April 2016

General information
- Location: 179th Street & Southwest Highway; Orland Park, Illinois
- Coordinates: 41.5638°N 87.9025°W
- Owner: Metra
- Platforms: 1 side platform
- Tracks: 1

Construction
- Accessible: Yes

Other information
- Fare zone: 4

History
- Opened: January 3, 1995

Passengers
- 2018: 208 (average weekday) ▲3.5%
- Rank: 162 out of 236

Services
Preceding station	Metra	Following station
Laraway Road/New Lenox toward Manhattan	SouthWest Service	153rd Street/Orland Park toward Union Station
Track layout
Location

179th Street/Orland Park is one of three stations on Metra's SouthWest Service in Orland Park, Illinois. The station is 28.7 miles (46.2 km) away from Chicago Union Station, the northern terminus of the line. In Metra's zone-based fare system, 179th Street is in zone 4. As of 2018, 179th Street is the 162nd busiest of Metra's 236 non-downtown stations, with an average of 208 weekday boardings. The station was the southern terminus of the line from January 3, 1995 to January 30, 2006 when it was extended to New Lenox and Manhattan.

As of February 15, 2024, 179th Street/Orland Park is served by all 30 trains (15 in each direction) on weekdays, with 10 inbound trains originating here and 10 outbound trains terminating here. Saturday service is currently suspended.

Although 179th Street is no longer the terminus of the SouthWest Service, most trains end their trips at this station. During peak hours trains continue to Laraway Road and Manhattan.
