= Chicago Ridge, Illinois =

- Village
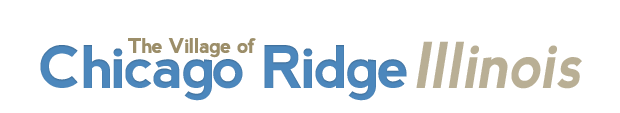
- logo

- Location of Chicago Ridge in Cook County, Illinois.

- Location within Greater Chicago Location within Illinois Location within the United States
- Coordinates: 41°42′9″N 87°46′43″W
- Country: United States
- State: Illinois
- County: Cook
- Township: Worth
- Incorporated: 1914

Government
  - Type: Council–manager
  - Mayor: Charles "Chuck" Tokar

Area
  - Total: 2.27 sq mi (5.87 km^{2})
  - Land: 2.27 sq mi (5.87 km^{2})
  - Water: 0 sq mi (0.00 km^{2}) 0%

Population (2020)
  - Total: 14,433
  - Density: 6,363.9/sq mi (2,457.11/km^{2})

Standard of living (2007-11)
  - Per capita income: $22,822
  - Home value: $180,300
- ZIP code(s): 60414, 60415
- Area code(s): 708
- Geocode: 17-14065
- FIPS code: 17-14065
- Website: chicagoridge.org

Chicago Ridge is a village in Cook County, Illinois, United States. Per the 2020 census, the population was 14,433. It is a suburb of Chicago.

== History ==
Chicago Ridge takes its name from ridges left behind when trainloads of dirt were brought out by the Wabash Railroad during construction of the Columbian Exposition of 1893.

Incorporated on October 17, 1914, the village has an area of approximately 2.2 square miles (5.7 km^{2}) and is located in the southwestern portion of Cook County, Illinois, about 20 miles (32 km) southwest of downtown Chicago.

The path of Stony Creek arcs through the village. It is not only an old creek but also the remnants of a feeder canal for the Illinois & Michigan Canal that reached from the Little Calumet River westward through the Saganashkee Slough. Although the work on the feeder canal brought some settlers in the 1840s, German and Dutch farmers arrived after the 1850s.

Settlement increased when what would become the Wabash Railroad 6th district was constructed through the area in 1879. Later, the Wabash would be crossed in the middle of Chicago Ridge by the Chicago and Calumet Terminal Railway, which also established rail yards in the village.

In 1898, the Paul E. Berger Company, manufacturers of cash registers and slot machines, located adjacent to the railroad. The Berger Company built housing for its employees, and a settlement emerged around the factory, with a tavern, rooming house, and grocery store. The first post office opened in 1900 in the Berger factory, and in 1902 the Wabash Railroad established a train station.

Both Chicago Ridge and Worth benefited from the activity and economic influences of a racetrack operating on 111th Street. Local residents proudly recall that a member of one of the founding families of the Chicago Ridge area, Fred Herbert, won the Kentucky Derby in 1910. The racetrack was torn down in 1911 and is now the site of Holy Sepulchre Cemetery.

After Oak Lawn incorporated in 1909, Chicago Ridge considered the move. An incorporated government could replace wooden sidewalks, deal with the stagnant waters in the swampy areas, initiate local municipal services and provide locally elected and accountable officials. They accomplished those tasks and more. Their successors then built on those early improvements with paved streets, sewers, street lights, and sidewalks. They also brought Lake Michigan water to the area.

Chicago Ridge grew from 176 in 1920 to 888 in 1950. With the great demand for housing and the expansion of road networks to include expressways, Chicago Ridge was poised for growth. Along with a strong new industrial and commercial base, the population increased dramatically, to 5,748 in 1960 and 14,127 in 2000.

== Geography ==
Chicago Ridge is located at 41°42′9″N 87°46′43″W (41.702482, -87.778690).

According to the 2021 census gazetteer files, Chicago Ridge has a total area of 2.27 square miles (5.88 km^{2}), all land.

Located in Cook County, the village is 18 miles (29 km) southwest of the Loop. Chicago Ridge's irregular shape is bounded by Oak Lawn on the north and east, Bridgeview and Palos Hills on the west, and Worth on the south.

== Demographics ==
Historical population
Census	Pop.	Note	%±
1920	176		—
1930	269		52.8%
1940	376		39.8%
1950	888		136.2%
1960	5,748		547.3%
1970	9,187		59.8%
1980	13,473		46.7%
1990	13,643		1.3%
2000	14,127		3.5%
2010	14,305		1.3%
2020	14,433		0.9%
U.S. Decennial Census; 2010 2020

=== Racial and ethnic composition ===
Chicago Ridge village, Illinois – Racial and ethnic composition Note: the US Census treats Hispanic/Latino as an ethnic category. This table excludes Latinos from the racial categories and assigns them to a separate category. Hispanics/Latinos may be of any race.
Race / Ethnicity (NH = Non-Hispanic)	Pop 2000	Pop 2010	Pop 2020	% 2000	% 2010	% 2020
White alone (NH)	12,052	10,952	9,983	85.31%	76.56%	69.17%
Black or African American alone (NH)	337	977	1,388	2.39%	6.83%	9.62%
Native American or Alaska Native alone (NH)	22	19	5	0.16%	0.13%	0.03%
Asian alone (NH)	203	254	336	1.44%	1.78%	2.33%
Pacific Islander alone (NH)	0	5	0	0.00%	0.03%	0.00%
Other race alone (NH)	10	22	55	0.07%	0.15%	0.38%
Mixed race or Multiracial (NH)	620	300	408	4.39%	2.10%	2.83%
Hispanic or Latino (any race)	883	1,776	2,258	6.25%	12.42%	15.64%
Total	14,127	14,305	14,433	100.00%	100.00%	100.00%

=== 2020 census ===
As of the 2020 census, Chicago Ridge had a population of 14,433. The population density was 6,363.76 inhabitants per square mile (2,457.06/km^{2}). There were 3,364 families residing in the village.

100.0% of residents lived in urban areas, while 0.0% lived in rural areas.

There were 5,687 households in Chicago Ridge, of which 31.0% had children under the age of 18 living in them. Of all households, 40.1% were married-couple households, 22.7% were households with a male householder and no spouse or partner present, and 31.4% were households with a female householder and no spouse or partner present. About 32.6% of all households were made up of individuals and 11.2% had someone living alone who was 65 years of age or older.

The median age was 36.0 years. 22.8% of residents were under the age of 18 and 14.5% of residents were 65 years of age or older. For every 100 females there were 98.4 males, and for every 100 females age 18 and over there were 95.6 males age 18 and over.

There were 5,989 housing units at an average density of 2,640.65 per square mile (1,019.56/km^{2}). Of all housing units, 5.0% were vacant. The homeowner vacancy rate was 1.3% and the rental vacancy rate was 5.9%.

=== Income and poverty ===
The median income for a household in the village was $51,555, and the median income for a family was $64,206. Males had a median income of $40,596 versus $33,699 for females. The per capita income for the village was $24,310. About 19.4% of families and 21.0% of the population were below the poverty line, including 32.3% of those under age 18 and 8.9% of those age 65 or over.

== Government ==
Chicago Ridge is in Illinois's 3rd congressional district.The village of Chicago Ridge is governed by a President and Board of Trustees. The Village President is the chief executive officer, and the board of trustees is the legislative body. The Village Clerk is the keeper of the records. The Village President, Board of Trustees and Clerk are all elected to four-year terms. Local elections are held every two years in the spring.

The Chicago Ridge Park District offers a "before/after" school care program.

== Business and industry ==
Over the years, recreational and cultural amenities including parks and a library, as well as business and industry were added to the picture.

=== Industry ===
Landis Plastics, Inc. is based in Chicago Ridge, with five domestic facilities supporting North American customers. Landis manufactures injection molded and thermoformed plastic packaging for dairy and other food products. Over the past 15 years, Landis has experienced robust organic growth in sales of 10.4%. During 2002, Landis generated $211.6 million of net sales. Landis Plastics, Inc. was purchased by Berry Plastics Corp. in 2003.

The Park at Chicago Ridge is a 135-acre (0.55 km^{2}) industrial park located off Southwest Highway at 103rd Street, which features rail transport and easy access to major expressways, including the Tri-State Tollway, and the Stevenson and Eisenhower expressways.

=== Retail ===
The Chicago Ridge Mall (formerly Westfield Chicago Ridge) at 95th and Ridgeland has over 130 stores and a six-screen theater. The Chicago Ridge Commons at 99th and Ridgeland has over 55 strip stores. Commercial development is currently centered in the industrial sector, the Park at Chicago Ridge.

== Culture ==
=== RidgeFest ===
Chicago Ridge hosts the annual RidgeFest celebration the last weekend in July at Freedom Park. It is one of the best-known summer festivals in the southwest suburban Chicago area. It consistently draws large crowds from throughout the Chicago metropolitan area.

=== Parks and recreation ===
The Chicago Ridge Park District has 23 acres (93,000 m^{2}) of land available for recreational purposes, divided among nine parks containing tennis courts, baseball fields, a fitness center/gymnasium, and a newly completed miniature golf/batting cages complex. The district offers over 100 programs for residents of all ages.

== Transportation ==
Chicago Ridge has a station on Metra's SouthWest Service, which provides daily rail service between Manhattan, Illinois, and Chicago Union Station. Pace provides bus service on multiple routes connecting Chicago Ridge to destinations across the Southland.

== Education ==
=== Public schools ===
Chicago Ridge provides some public services. These include the Chicago Ridge Public Library, Elden Finley Junior High School, Ridge Central Elementary School, Ridge Lawn Elementary School, Freedom Activity Center (which provides preschool), and Teen Center.

Public schooling is provided through the Chicago Ridge School District 127 1/2. Elden Finley Junior is Chicago Ridge's middle school. The mascot is a Viking. The colors are black, white, and gray. They provide grades 6 through 8.

Ridge Central Elementary School is one of Chicago Ridge's elementary schools. The mascot are stars, and the colors are navy blue and gold. They provide grades pre-kindergarten through fifth.

Ridge Lawn Elementary School is the other of Chicago Ridge's elementary schools. The mascot is an eagle. The colors are royal and white. They provide grades pre-kindergarten through fifth.

Chicago Ridge high school students attend Harold L. Richards High School in neighboring Oak Lawn.

=== Private schools ===
The Roman Catholic Archdiocese of Chicago operates Catholic schools. Our Lady of the Ridge Catholic School closed in 2018.

== Notable person ==
- Tim Pyznarski, first baseman for the San Diego Padres
