= Worth station =

Commuter rail station in Worth, Illinois

Worth

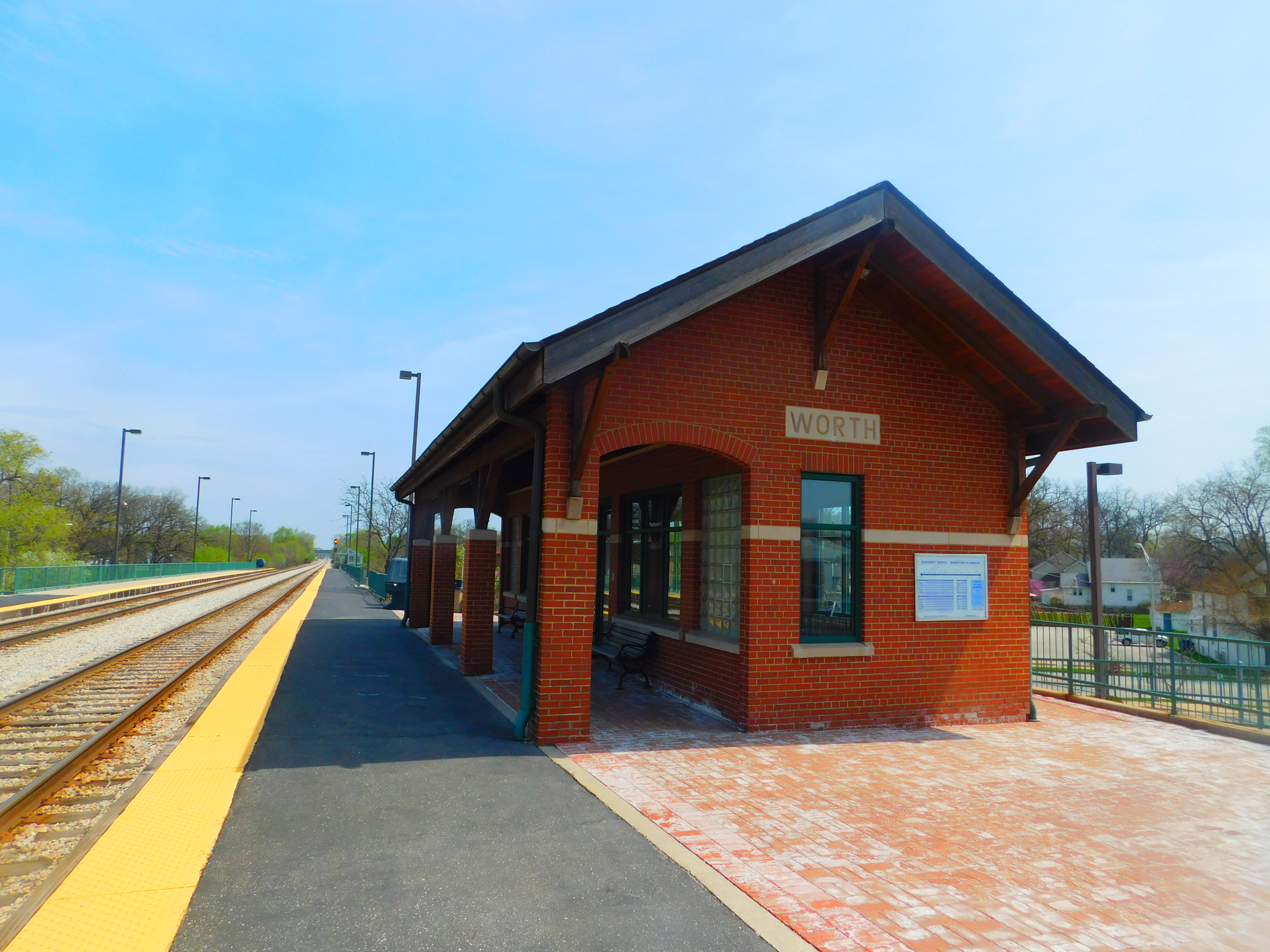
- Worth station in April 2016

General information
- Location: 110th Street & Depot Road; Worth, Illinois
- Coordinates: 41.6914°N 87.7959°W
- Owner: Village of Worth
- Platforms: 2 side platforms
- Tracks: 2
- Connections: Pace Buses

Construction
- Accessible: Yes

Other information
- Fare zone: 3

Key dates
- February 1964: Station agency discontinued

Passengers
- 2018: 406 (average weekday) ▼3.1%
- Rank: 119 out of 236

Services
Preceding station	Metra	Following station
Palos Heights toward Manhattan	SouthWest Service	Chicago Ridge toward Union Station
Former services
Preceding station	Norfolk and Western Railway	Following station
Palos Heights toward Orland Park	Orland Park Cannonball	Chicago Ridge toward Chicago
Preceding station	Wabash Railroad	Following station
Palos Heights toward Kansas City	Main Line	Chicago Ridge toward Chicago
Track layout
Location

Worth is a station on Metra's SouthWest Service in Worth, Illinois. The station is 17.8 miles (28.6 km) away from Chicago Union Station, the northern terminus of the line. In Metra's zone-based fare system, Worth is in zone 3. As of 2018, Worth is the 119th busiest of Metra's 236 non-downtown stations, with an average of 406 weekday boardings.

As of February 15, 2024, Worth is served by 28 trains (14 in each direction) on weekdays. Saturday service is currently suspended.

Worth consists of two side platforms which serve the SouthWest Service's two tracks. There is an unattended waiting room on the inbound platform which is open from 5:00 a.m. to 10:00 a.m. Parking is available on both side of the tracks, east of Harlem Avenue (IL 43).

== Bus connections ==
- 384 Narragansett/Ridgeland
- 385 87th/111th/127th
- 386 South Harlem
