= Ashburn station =

Ashburn station may refer to:

- Ashburn station (Illinois) in Ashburn, Chicago, Illinois
- Ashburn station (Washington Metro) in Loudoun County, Virginia
