= 153rd Street/Orland Park station =

Commuter rail station in Orland Park, Illinois

153rd Street/Orland Park

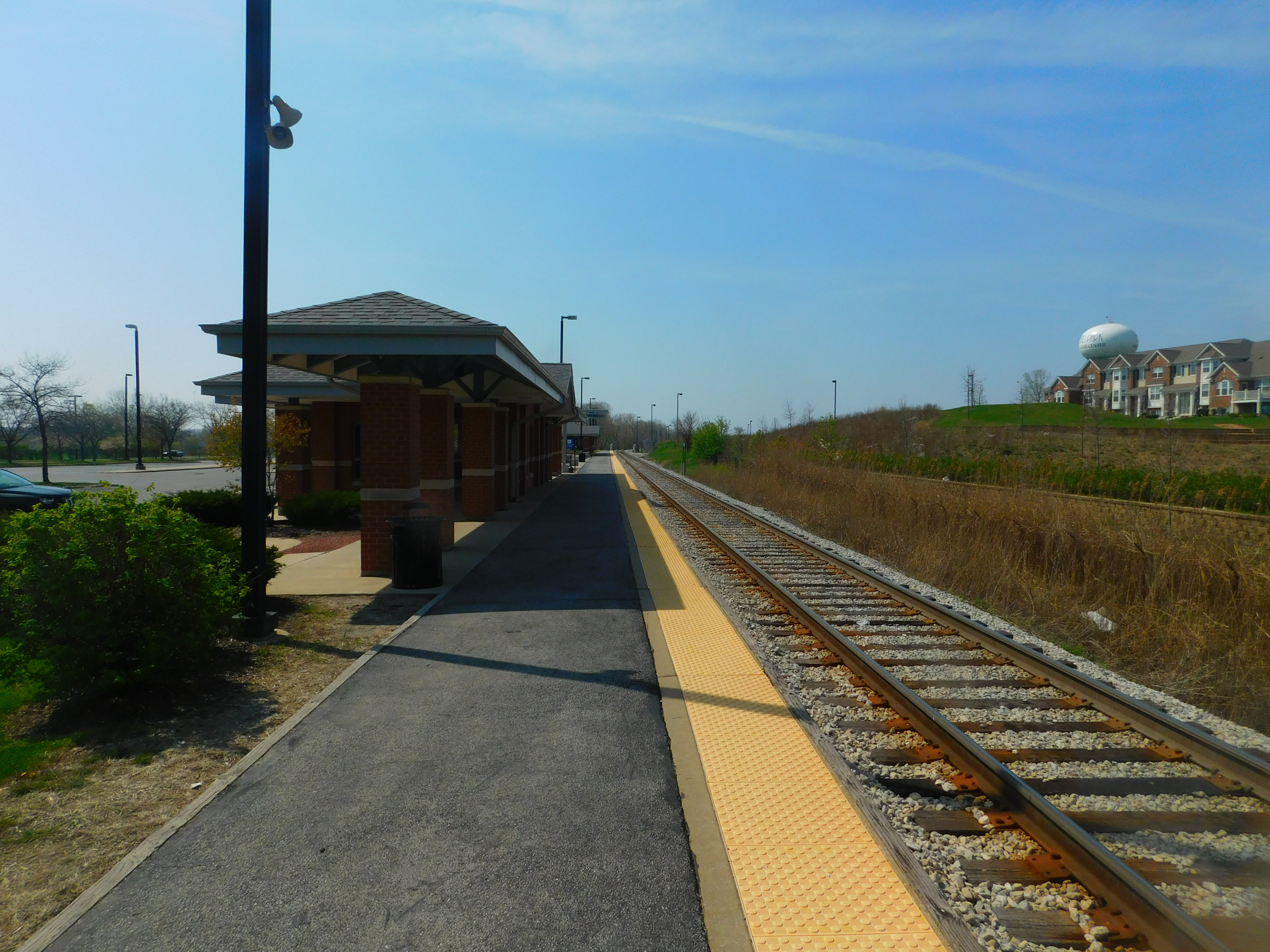
- Orland Park 153rd Street station in April 2016

General information
- Location: 10401 West 153rd Street; Orland Park, Illinois
- Coordinates: 41.6095°N 87.8734°W
- Owner: Metra
- Platforms: 1 side platform
- Tracks: 1

Construction
- Accessible: Yes

Other information
- Fare zone: 4

History
- Opened: June 4, 1990

Passengers
- 2018: 544 (average weekday) ▼9.9%
- Rank: 94 out of 236

Services
| Preceding station | Metra | Following station |
|---|---|---|
| 179th Street/Orland Park toward Manhattan | SouthWest Service | 143rd Street/Orland Park toward Union Station |
Track layout
Location

153rd Street/Orland Park is one of three stations on Metra's SouthWest Service in Orland Park, Illinois. The station is 25.2 miles (40.6 km) away from Chicago Union Station, the northern terminus of the line. In Metra's zone-based fare system, 153rd Street is in zone 4. As of 2018, 153rd Street is the 94th busiest of Metra's 236 non-downtown stations, with an average of 544 weekday boardings.

Unlike all other stations on the SouthWest Service (besides Union Station), tickets are sold here.

As of February 15, 2024, 153rd Street/Orland Park is served by all 30 trains (15 in each direction) on weekdays. One of the outbound trains that stops at the station makes a flag stop. Saturday service is currently suspended.

== Connections ==
Pace Bus route 832
