= Palos Park station =

Commuter rail station in Palos Park, Illinois

Palos Park

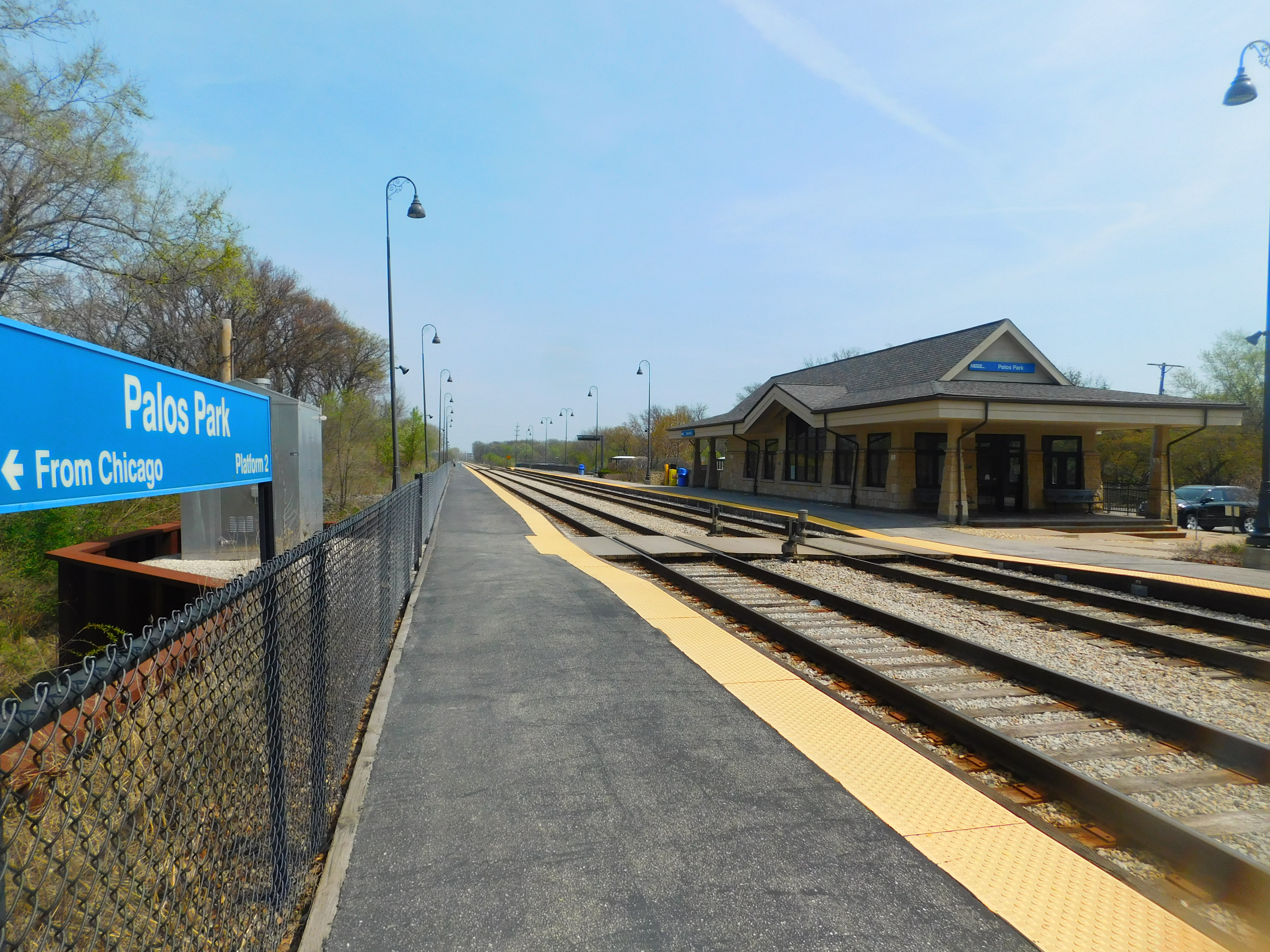
- Palos Park station in April 2016

General information
- Location: 123rd Street & 82nd Avenue; Palos Park, Illinois
- Coordinates: 41.6690°N 87.8202°W
- Owner: Metra
- Platforms: 2 side platforms
- Tracks: 2

Construction
- Accessible: Yes

Other information
- Fare zone: 4

Key dates
- February 1964: Station agency discontinued

Passengers
- 2018: 424 (average weekday) ▼1.9%
- Rank: 112 out of 236

Services
Preceding station	Metra	Following station
143rd Street/Orland Park toward Manhattan	SouthWest Service	Palos Heights toward Union Station
Former services
Preceding station	Norfolk and Western Railway	Following station
Southmore toward Orland Park	Orland Park Cannonball	Palos Heights toward Chicago
Preceding station	Wabash Railroad	Following station
Orland Park toward Kansas City	Main Line	Palos Heights toward Chicago
Track layout
Location

Palos Park is a station on Metra's SouthWest Service in Palos Park, Illinois. The station is 19.8 miles (31.9 km) away from Chicago Union Station, the northern terminus of the line. In Metra's zone-based fare system, Palos Park is in zone 4. As of 2018, Palos Park is the 112th busiest of Metra's 236 non-downtown stations, with an average of 424 weekday boardings.

As of February 15, 2024, Palos Park is served by all 30 trains (15 in each direction) on weekdays. Saturday service is currently suspended.
