= Forrest, Illinois =

- Village
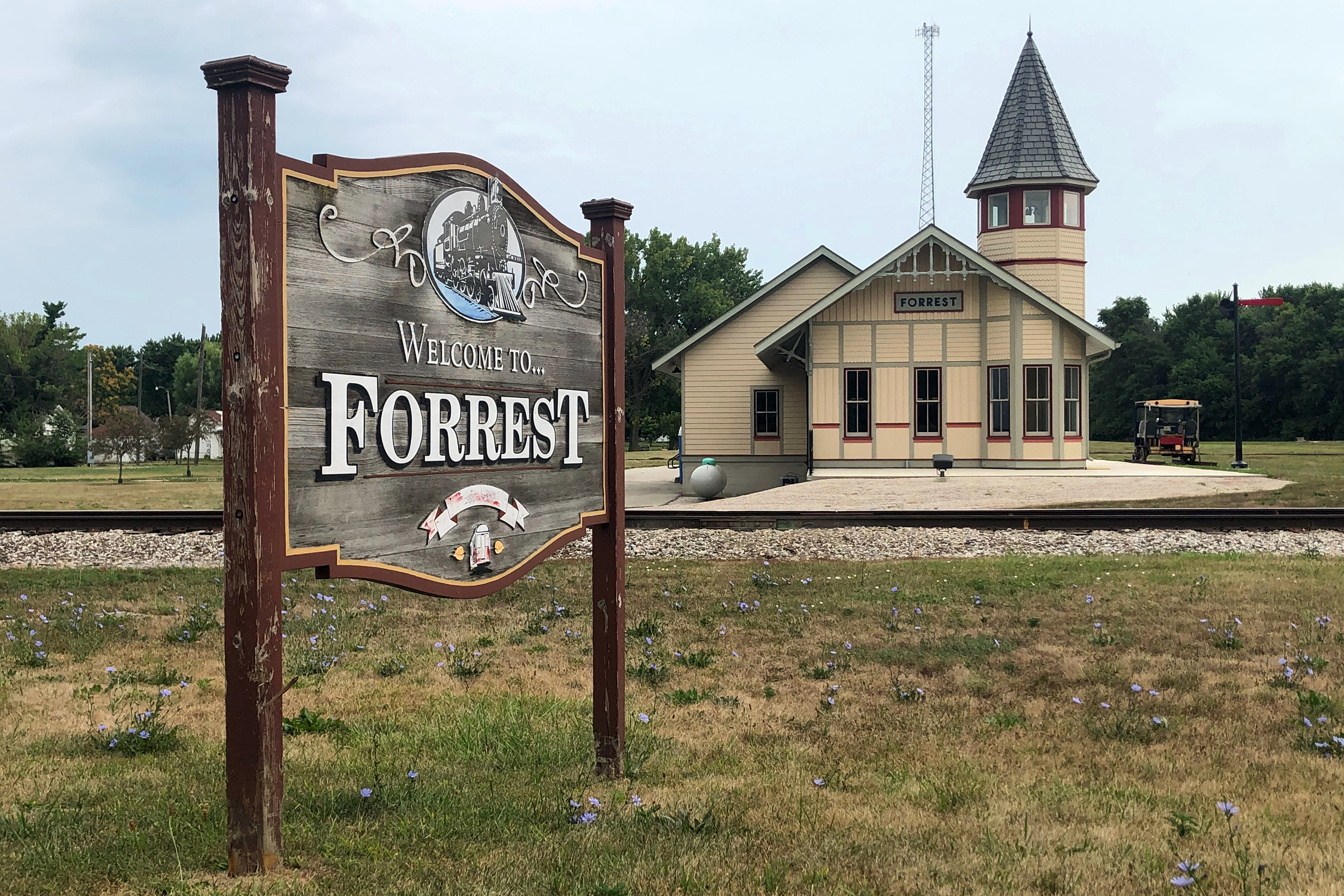
- The sign for the town of Forrest, Illinois, with the railway museum in the background.

- Location in Livingston County, Illinois
- Coordinates: 40°44′52″N 88°24′32″W
- Country: United States
- State: Illinois
- County: Livingston
- Townships: Forrest, Pleasant Ridge

Area
  - Total: 0.65 sq mi (1.68 km^{2})
  - Land: 0.65 sq mi (1.68 km^{2})
  - Water: 0 sq mi (0.00 km^{2})
- Elevation: 686 ft (209 m)

Population (2020)
  - Total: 1,041
  - Density: 1,605.6/sq mi (619.93/km^{2})
- Time zone: UTC-6 (CST)
  - Summer (DST): UTC-5 (CDT)
- ZIP code: 61741
- Area code: 815
- FIPS code: 17-27026
- GNIS feature ID: 2398899
- Website: www.forrestil.org

Forrest is a village in Livingston County, Illinois, United States. The population was 1,041 at the 2020 census.

== History ==
=== Founding and naming ===
Forrest was laid out on December 11, 1866, by Israel J. Krack (1816 – 1900). Krack was born in Baltimore, Maryland. Both of his parents had come from Germany. He was briefly a teacher, lived in Indiana, and came to Livingston County in 1854. Krack was a farmer, notary public, grain dealer, and in later life an insurance agent. Krack was elected to the Illinois General Assembly in 1872 and became treasurer of Livingston County in 1878. Krack Street, which parallels the railroad, was named for the town's founder.

When Forrest was established, the Toledo, Peoria and Western Railroad had already been in operation for almost ten years, and therefore the origin of the town is unlike Fairbury, Chatsworth, Chenoa, Gridley and El Paso, all of which were founded when the railroad was first built. Within a few years of its founding, the people of Forrest did not know the full name of the person for whom the town was named. The author of the 1878 History of Livingston County says only two things about Mr. Forrest: he was a business partner of C. L. Frost, an official of the Toledo, Peoria and Western, and that he had promised to do something for the young village and that promise was "unfulfilled". The first version of the name was said to be "Forestville", spelled with one "r", but the "Forrest" spelling quickly came into use. Forrest Township was created soon after the village was founded and took its name from the village.

=== Design and commerce ===
In 1861 or 1862, before the town was platted, Israel J. Krack was operating a grain elevator at the location. Like most towns of the period, the plan of the original town of Forrest was centered on a long narrow depot grounds, which were on the north side of the tracks. The plat was for a simple grid of twenty blocks. The first house in Forrest was built by Mr. Krack, who was also the first postmaster and the first station agent. He also laid out many additions to the town. The first hotel was built by William Umberfield and was known as the Forrest House. The first mill was built by R. B. Wilson. The first church was built by the Methodists in 1868. The town grew rapidly and by 1890 had over 1,000 people. Forrest, like almost every other early town of central Illinois during this period, was built from inexpensive pine lumber brought in by the railroad from Michigan or Wisconsin. In the winter of 1868-1869 much of the business district, including one grain warehouse, was burned. It was quickly rebuilt. This was the first of many fires that plagued the new town. In 1890 a particularly devastating blaze destroyed much of downtown Forrest. Rebuilding was rapid, and by 1893 there were five hotels.

=== Introduction of the Wabash Railroad ===
The people of Forrest worked to attract a second railroad. At first there were hopes that the Chicago and Paducah Railroad could be induced to construct its tracks through the town, but this road was diverted to nearby Fairbury. Success came when what would become the Wabash Railroad 6th district was constructed through Forrest in 1880. On May 1 of that year, the first train on the Wabash route passed through Forrest. The village became a division point and important stopping place on the Wabash line linking Chicago and St Louis. Soon repair shops were built, and by the early 1890s over sixty men were employed here. The town became a freight shipment point for the Chicago Division of the railroad. In 1894 local workers supported a strike against the Wabash, and many of those who had supported the strike lost their jobs to strikebreakers. The Freight Division was removed to Decatur. Between 1914 and 1921 it was briefly returned to Forrest. By the 1920s the days of Forrest as a railroad center began to fade. In 1924 the state of Illinois began construction on a paved road that eventually became U.S. Route 24.

== Geography ==
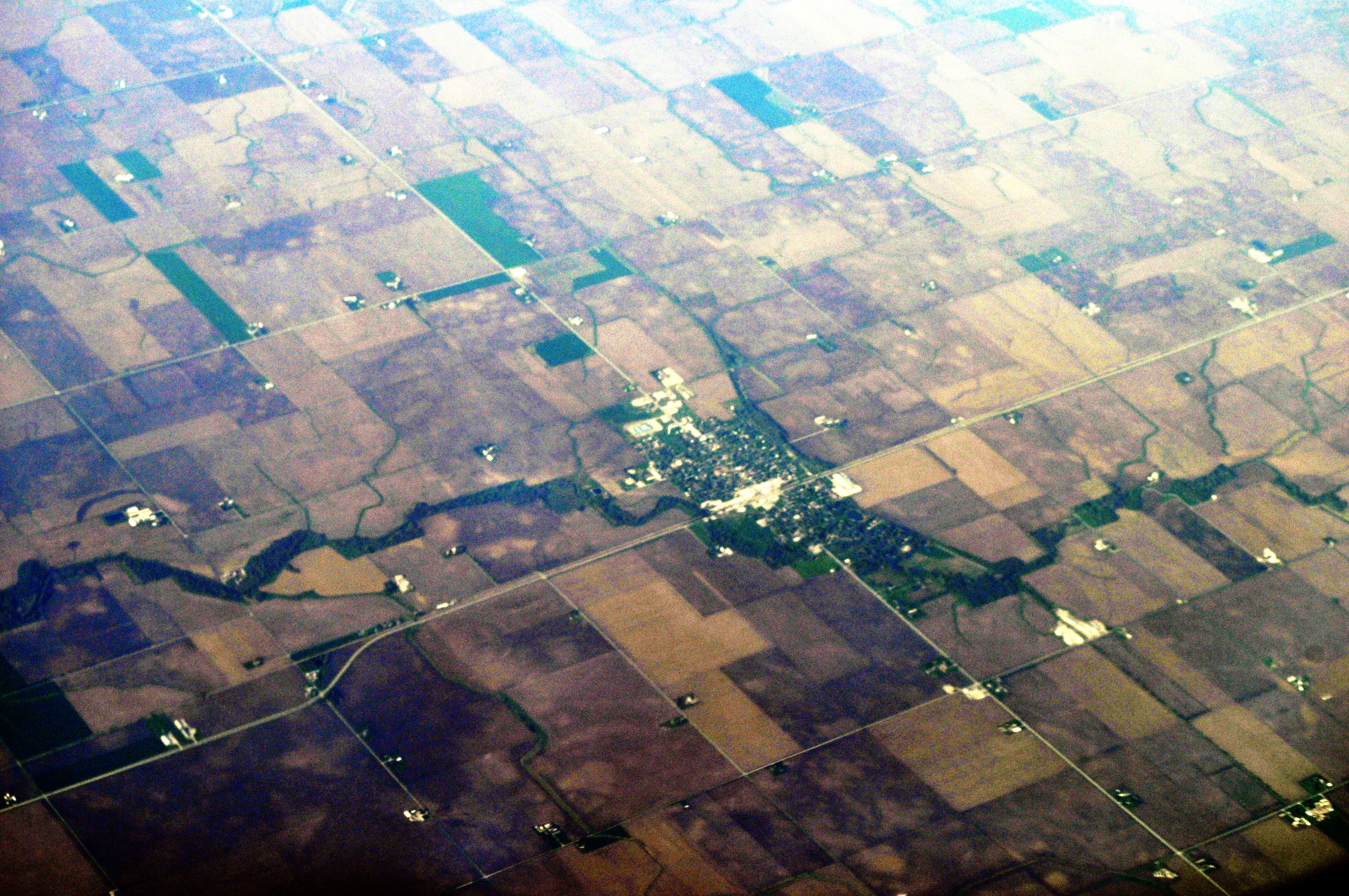
Aerial view of Forrest, 2012

Forrest is located in southeastern Livingston County in the northern part of Forrest Township, with a small area extending north into Pleasant Ridge Township.

U.S. Route 24 (Wabash Avenue) passes through the village, leading east 21 miles (34 km) to Interstate 57 at Gilman and west 17 miles (27 km) to Interstate 55 at Chenoa. Illinois Route 47 (Center Street) crosses US 24 near the village center; it leads north 24 miles (39 km) to Dwight and south 20 miles (32 km) to Gibson City.

According to the 2021 census gazetteer files, Forrest has a total area of 0.65 square miles (1.68 km^{2}), all land.

=== Historical landmarks ===
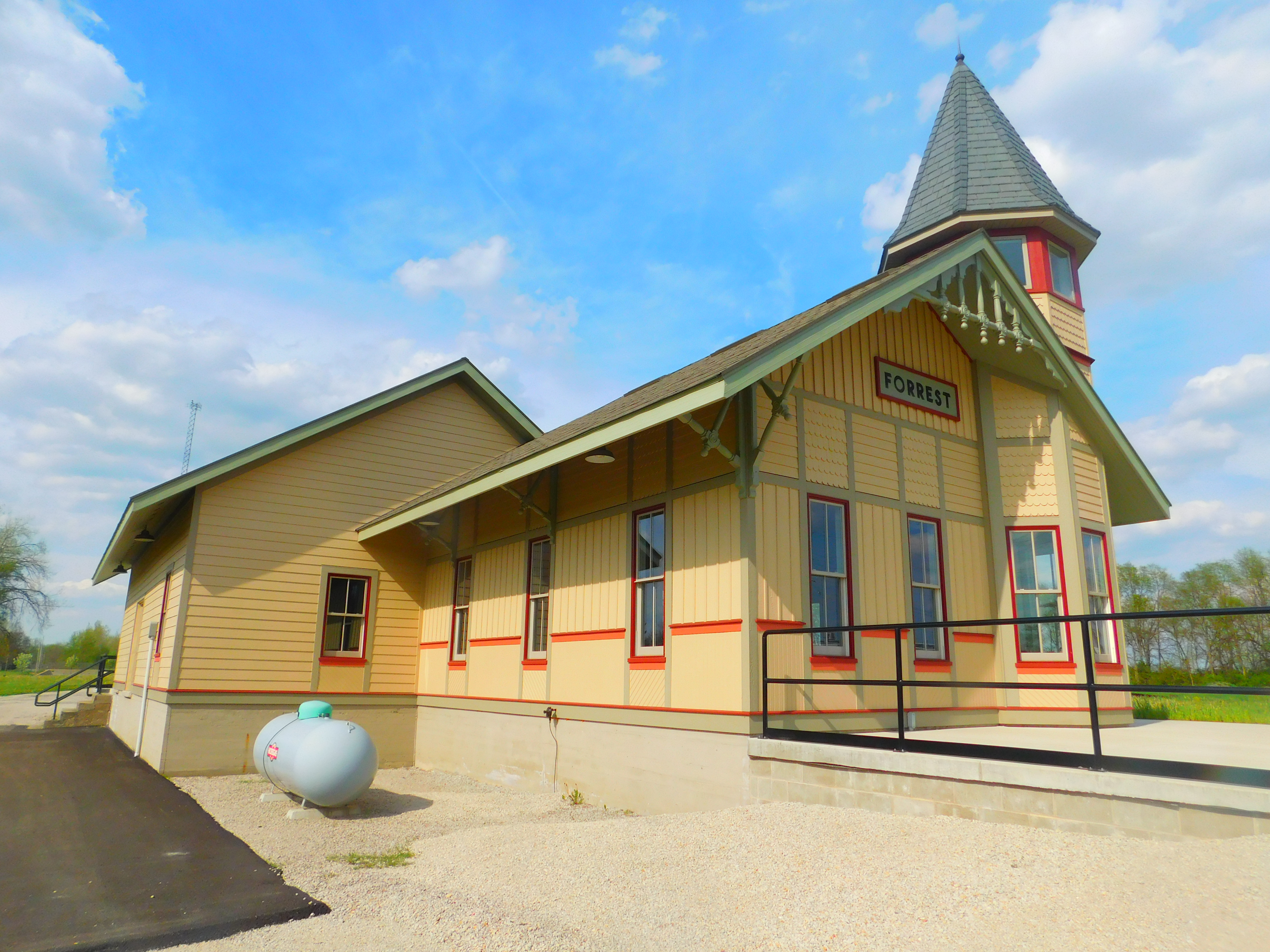
Forrest's Wabash Railroad depot in April 2016

In the Railroad Park at Forrest are several important railroad-related remains. A surviving railroad turntable is located here. The turntable was re-painted in 2017. The park also contains the former Wabash Railroad station and a restored Norfolk & Western Railroad caboose. The Wabash Railroad station is now a museum, and contains a scale model of the town as it was in its railroad heyday. The model includes a fully functional turntable and electric railroad track. The museum also contains many artifacts from the early 1900s.

== Demographics ==
Historical population
Census	Pop.	Note	%±
1880	357		—
1890	1,021		186.0%
1900	952		−6.8%
1910	967		1.6%
1920	965		−0.2%
1930	915		−5.2%
1940	947		3.5%
1950	1,040		9.8%
1960	1,220		17.3%
1970	1,219		−0.1%
1980	1,246		2.2%
1990	1,124		−9.8%
2000	1,225		9.0%
2010	1,220		−0.4%
2020	1,041		−14.7%
U.S. Decennial Census

=== 2020 census ===
As of the 2020 census there were 1,041 people, 456 households, and 323 families residing in the village. The population density was 1,606.48 inhabitants per square mile (620.27/km^{2}). There were 485 housing units at an average density of 748.46 per square mile (288.98/km^{2}). Of the 485 housing units, 12.4% were vacant. The homeowner vacancy rate was 3.0% and the rental vacancy rate was 12.9%.

The racial makeup of the village was 87.90% White, 0.38% African American, 0.38% Native American, 0.19% Asian, 0.00% Pacific Islander, 5.76% from other races, and 5.38% from two or more races. Hispanic or Latino of any race were 9.89% of the population.

There were 456 households, out of which 32.5% had children under the age of 18 living with them, 52.41% were married couples living together, 15.57% had a female householder with no husband present, and 29.17% were non-families. 27.63% of all households were made up of individuals, and 9.87% had someone living alone who was 65 years of age or older. The average household size was 2.60 and the average family size was 2.18.

The village's age distribution consisted of 20.3% under the age of 18, 8.1% from 18 to 24, 26.9% from 25 to 44, 29.9% from 45 to 64, and 14.5% who were 65 years of age or older. The median age was 40.2 years. For every 100 females, there were 88.8 males. For every 100 females age 18 and over, there were 78.6 males.

The median income for a household in the village was $61,058, and the median income for a family was $75,417. Males had a median income of $51,958 versus $27,438 for females. The per capita income for the village was $31,216. About 6.8% of families and 10.0% of the population were below the poverty line, including 21.0% of those under age 18 and 0.0% of those age 65 or over.

Racial composition as of the 2020 census
Race	Number	Percent
White	915	87.9%
Black or African American	4	0.4%
American Indian and Alaska Native	4	0.4%
Asian	2	0.2%
Native Hawaiian and Other Pacific Islander	0	0.0%
Some other race	60	5.8%
Two or more races	56	5.4%
Hispanic or Latino (of any race)	103	9.9%
