= Oak Lawn Patriot station =

Commuter rail station in Oak Lawn, Illinois

Oak Lawn Patriot

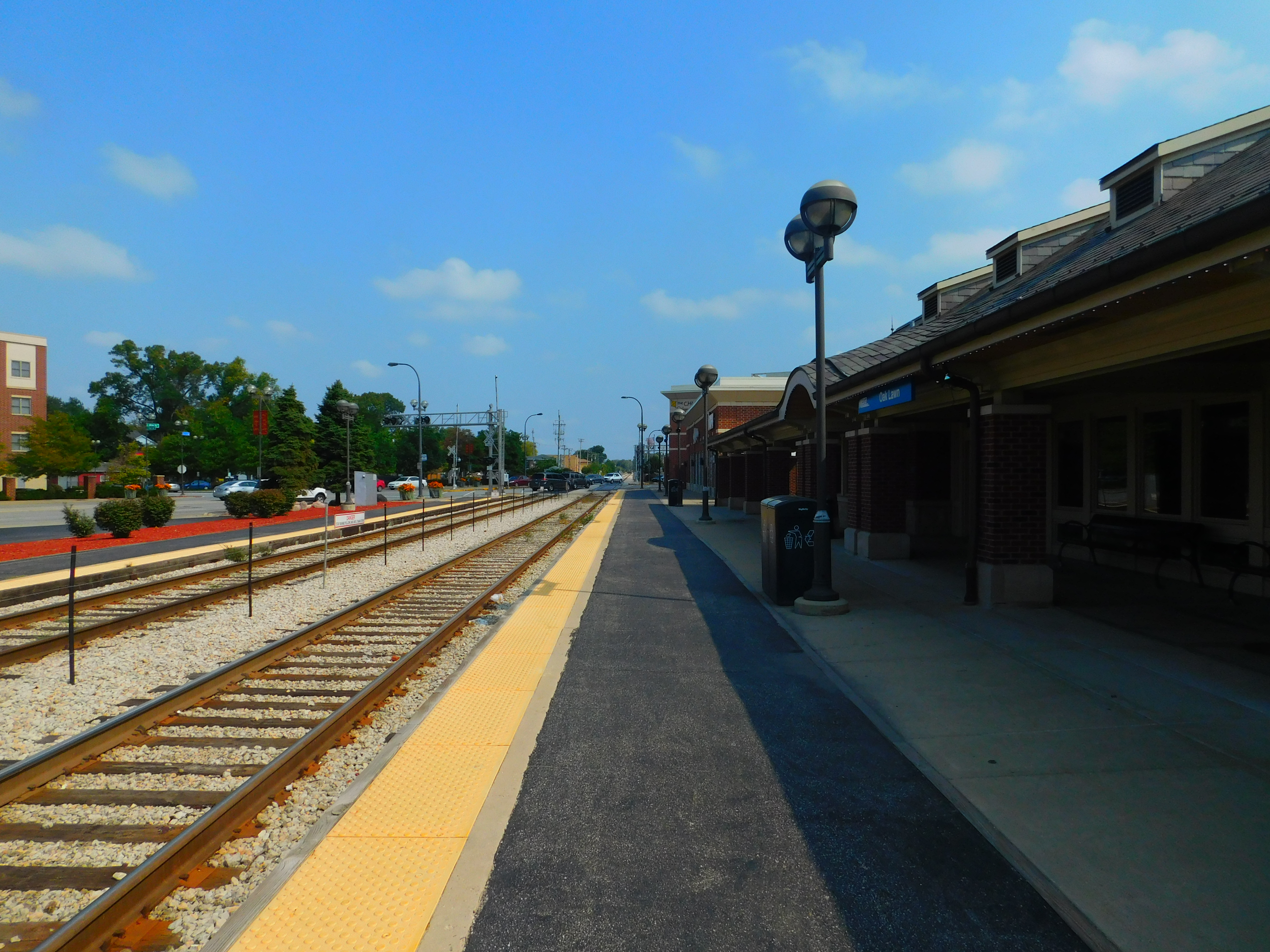

General information
- Location: 9525 South Tulley Avenue; Oak Lawn, Illinois
- Coordinates: 41.7195°N 87.7485°W
- Owner: Village of Oak Lawn
- Platforms: 2 side platforms
- Tracks: 2
- Connections: Pace Buses

Construction
- Parking: Yes
- Accessible: Yes

Other information
- Fare zone: 3

History
- Opened: 1984

Passengers
- 2018: 1,186 (average weekday) ▼10.8%
- Rank: 31 out of 236

Services
Preceding station	Metra	Following station
Chicago Ridge toward Manhattan	SouthWest Service	Ashburn toward Union Station
Former services
Preceding station	Norfolk and Western Railway	Following station
Chicago Ridge toward Orland Park	Orland Park Cannonball	Ashburn toward Chicago
Preceding station	Wabash Railroad	Following station
Chicago Ridge toward Kansas City	Main Line	Ashburn toward Chicago
Track layout
Location

Oak Lawn Patriot is a station on Metra's SouthWest Service in Oak Lawn, Illinois. The station is 14.7 miles (23.7 km) away from Chicago Union Station, the northern terminus of the line. In Metra's zone-based fare system, Oak Lawn Patriot is in zone 3. As of 2018, it is the 31st busiest of Metra's 236 non-downtown stations, with an average of 1,186 weekday boardings.

As of February 15, 2024, Oak Lawn Patriot is served by all 30 trains (15 in each direction) on weekdays. Saturday service is currently suspended.

The station was renamed Oak Lawn Patriot in 2012, due to the newly constructed 9/11 memorial on the station site. The memorial features two steel columns from the destroyed pre-2001 World Trade Center twin towers in New York City displayed as a memorial to the victims of the September 11 attacks. Most official websites, as well as on-train announcements refer to the station as Oak Lawn Patriot, however timetables and other sources may still refer to it as simply Oak Lawn.

Trains operate as far north as Chicago Union Station, and as far south as Orland Park and Manhattan.

== Bus connections ==
Pace

- 381 95th Street
- 395 95th/Dan Ryan CTA/UPS Hodgkins (weekday UPS shifts only)
