= Ashburn station (Illinois) =

Commuter rail station in Chicago, Illinois

Ashburn

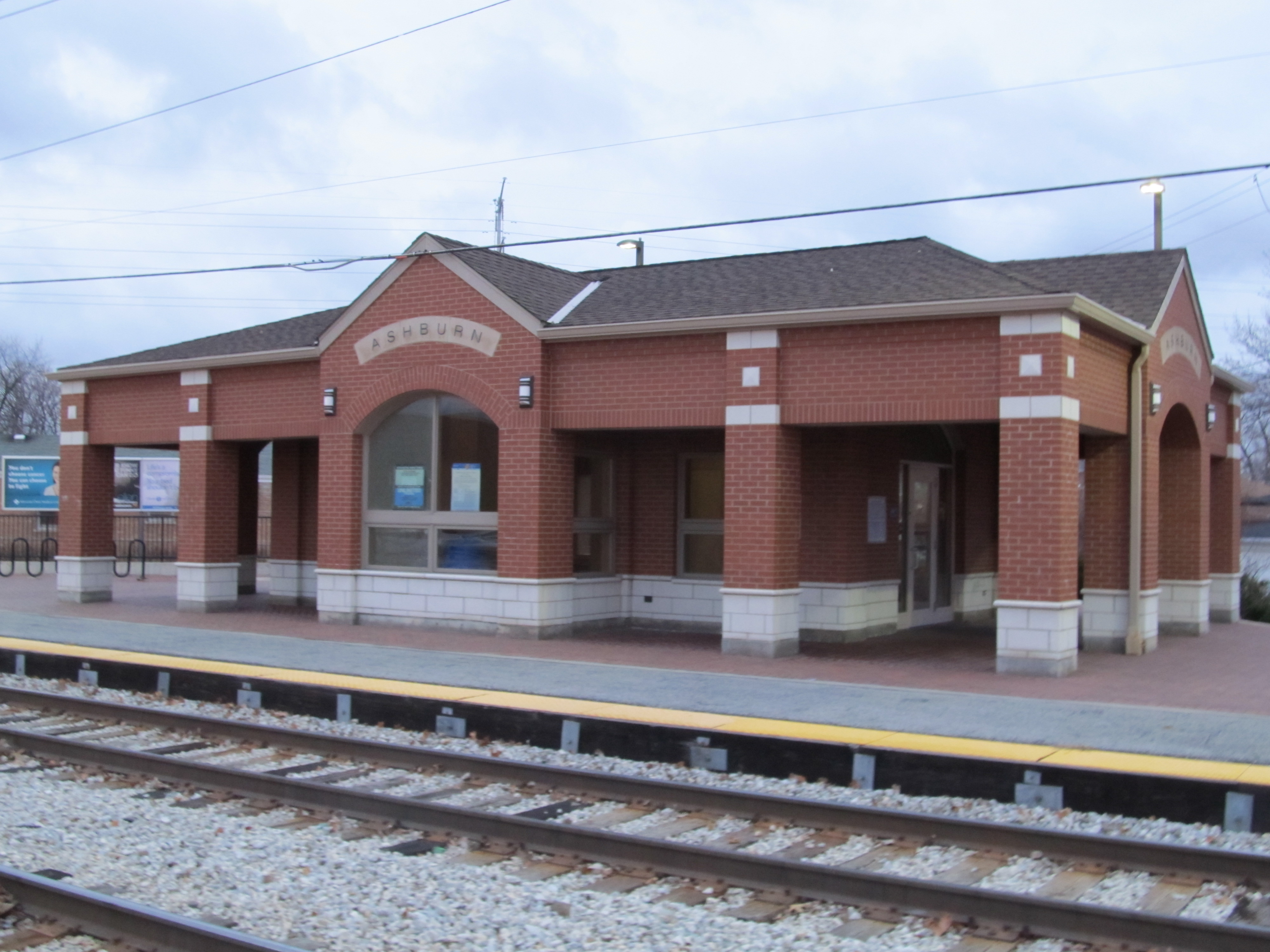

General information
- Location: 83rd Place & Columbus Avenue; Chicago, Illinois
- Coordinates: 41.7416°N 87.7127°W
- Platforms: 2 side platforms
- Tracks: 2

Construction
- Parking: Yes
- Cycle facilities: Yes; bicycle racks
- Accessible: Yes

Other information
- Fare zone: 2

History
- Opened: 2000

Passengers
- 2018: 229 (average weekday) ▲5%
- Rank: 161 out of 236

Services
Preceding station	Metra	Following station
Oak Lawn Patriot toward Manhattan	SouthWest Service	Wrightwood toward Union Station
Former services
Preceding station	Norfolk and Western Railway	Following station
Oak Lawn toward Orland Park	Orland Park Cannonball	Wrightwood toward Chicago
Preceding station	Wabash Railroad	Following station
Oak Lawn toward Kansas City	Main Line	Wrightwood toward Chicago
Track layout
Location

Ashburn is a station on Metra's SouthWest Service in the community area of Ashburn, Chicago, Illinois. The station is 12.2 miles (19.6 km) away from Chicago Union Station, the northern terminus of the line. In Metra's zone-based fare system, Ashburn is in zone 2. As of 2018, Ashburn is the 161st busiest of Metra's 236 non-downtown stations, with an average of 229 weekday boardings. There is an unstaffed shelter. There are no connecting bus services. The station is just west of an at-grade crossing with the Grand Trunk Railway (now owned by Canadian National through the Grand Trunk Corporation).

As of February 15, 2024, Ashburn is served by 27 trains (14 inbound, 13 outbound) on weekdays. Saturday service is currently suspended.
