= Laraway Road/New Lenox station =

Commuter rail station in New Lenox, Illinois

Laraway Road New Lenox

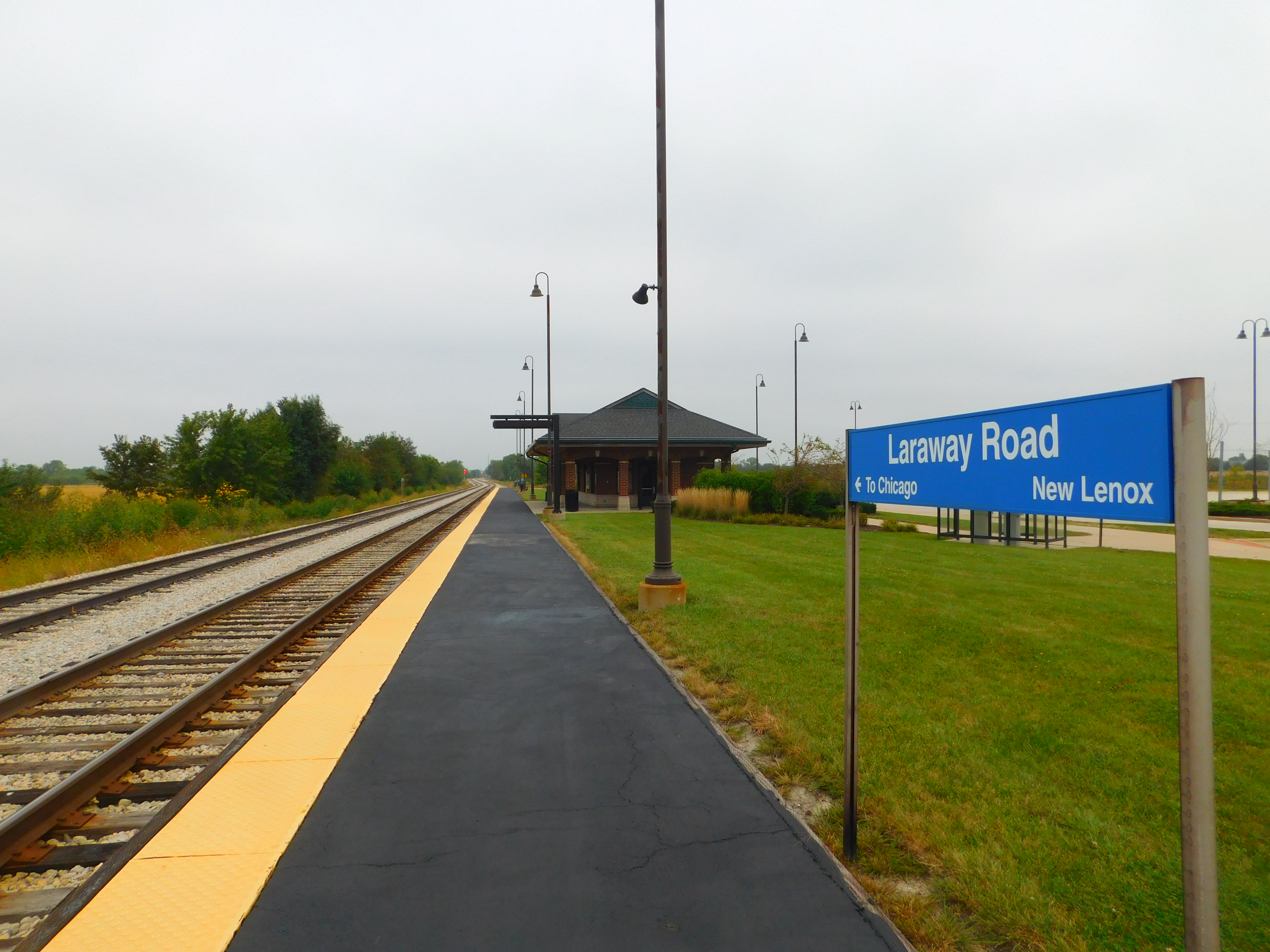
- Laraway Road station in September 2016

General information
- Location: 1861 Village Station Boulevard; New Lenox, Illinois
- Coordinates: 41.4848°N 87.9599°W
- Line: SouthWest Service
- Platforms: 1 side platform
- Tracks: 2

Construction
- Cycle facilities: Yes; bike shelter
- Accessible: Yes

Other information
- Fare zone: 4

History
- Opened: October 9, 2006

Passengers
- 2018: 19 (average weekday) ▼20.8%
- Rank: 228 out of 236

Services
| Preceding station | Metra | Following station |
|---|---|---|
| Manhattan Terminus | SouthWest Service | 179th Street/Orland Park toward Union Station |
Former services at Brisbane
| Preceding station | Wabash Railroad | Following station |
|---|---|---|
| Manhattan toward Kansas City | Main Line | Steele toward Chicago |
Track layout
Location

Laraway Road/New Lenox station is a commuter train station in New Lenox, Illinois, a southern suburb of Chicago. The station was dedicated on October 6, 2006, and train service began on October 9, 2006. The station is a stop for Metra's SouthWest Service trains, which go to Chicago Union Station in downtown Chicago. As of 2018, Laraway Road is the 228th busiest of Metra's 236 non-downtown stations, with an average of 19 weekday boardings. The station's rank is tied with the neighboring Manhattan station.

As of February 15, 2024, Laraway Road is served by 10 trains (five in each direction) on weekdays. Three of the outbound trains that stop at the station make a flag stop to discharge passengers. Saturday service is currently suspended.

The station's parking lot has 300 spaces, although there is enough room to have a total of 1,200. The actual station facilities are minimal, with a brick building housing bathrooms, along with a bike shelter. No bus service is available at the station, however.

A much older station exists in New Lenox along Metra's Rock Island District. Prior to approaching Laraway Road station, Metra's SouthWest Service crosses a bridge over the Rock Island District. No connection is available between either station or line.
