= Oak Lawn, Illinois =

- Village
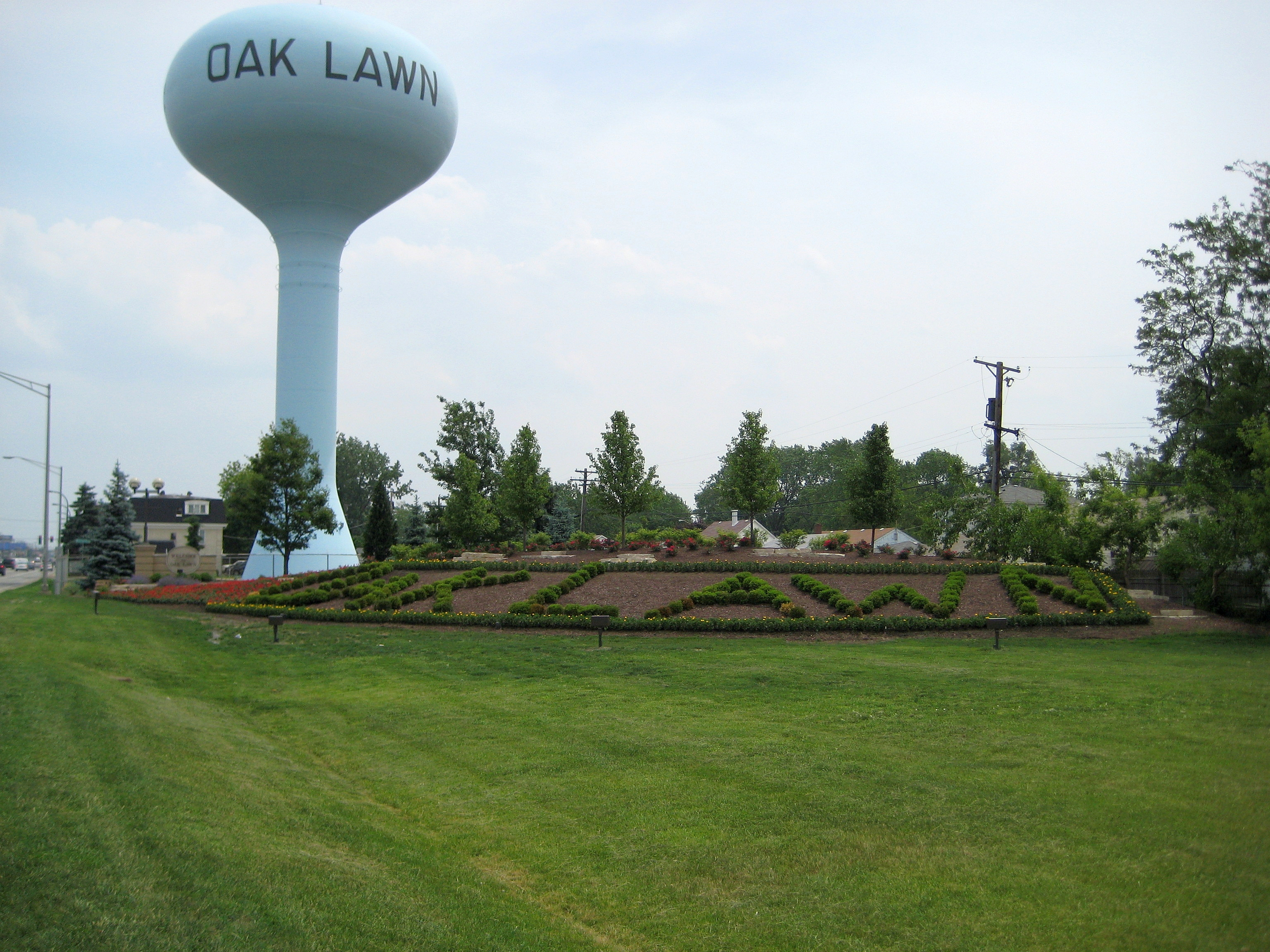

- Flag Seal
- Interactive map of Oak Lawn, Illinois
- Location within Greater Chicago Location within Illinois Location within the United States
- Coordinates: 41°42′54″N 87°45′12″W
- Country: United States
- State: Illinois
- County: Cook
- Township: Worth
- Incorporated: 1909

Government
  - Type: Council–manager
  - President: Terry Vorderer

Area
  - Total: 8.57 sq mi (22.20 km^{2})
  - Land: 8.57 sq mi (22.20 km^{2})
  - Water: 0 sq mi (0.00 km^{2}) 0%

Population (2020)
  - Total: 58,362
  - Estimate (2024): 56,531 ▼
  - Density: 6,809.4/sq mi (2,629.13/km^{2})

Standard of living (2024)
  - Per capita income: $41,927
  - Median home value: $281,200
- ZIP code(s): 60453, 60454, 60455, 60456, 60457, 60458, 60459
- Area code(s): 708
- Geocode: 54820
- FIPS code: 17-54820
- Website: www.oaklawn-il.gov

Oak Lawn is a village in Cook County, Illinois, United States, adjacent to Chicago. It is the 22nd-most populous municipality in Illinois, with a population of 58,362 as of the 2020 census. Oak Lawn was first settled in 1835 and later incorporated in 1909. The village serves as a major medical and economic anchor for the southwest Chicago suburbs, notably hosting Advocate Christ Medical Center, one of the largest hospitals and Level I trauma centers in the state of Illinois and in Chicagoland.

== History ==
=== Founding ===
In August 1835, James B. Campbell purchased the land stretching between Cicero Avenue and Central Avenue from 95th Street to 103rd Street. It is unclear what Campbell's intentions with the area were, but by 1840, he had lost a court battle with the Illinois State Bank and his land was sold in a public auction. John Simpson, a prominent figure in early Oak Lawn history, bought the northern half of the property in 1842. By 1859, the recently incorporated government of Worth Township paid for the construction of Black Oak Grove Road, an early name for 95th Street. Black Oak Grove is also the earliest known name of the area that would become Oak Lawn. It was later shortened to Black Oak or Black Oaks. Before this however, the area now known as Oak Lawn was, briefly during the early 1800s, called Agnes. It was also on some occasion referred to as Oak Park.

1880 saw the arrival of what would become the Wabash Railroad 6th district. By 1882, the post office, train depot and surrounding community became known simply as Oak Lawn. Over the next two decades, the area grew in population as more homes were built and local business sprang into being. As the area continued to grow, many residents visited Englewood by train to shop. Oak Lawn residents also made income during early days by selling their farm and dairy products to various markets in Chicago.

=== Incorporation ===
In 1909, Oak Lawn was incorporated as a village. The following years, there were major improvements to local infrastructure and government services, such as the introduction of the police magistrate and village marshal, along with the building of a village hall and jailhouse. Electric lights were brought to 95th Street in 1911, the volunteer fire department began in 1923, Oak Lawn's first bank opened in 1925, and the Community High School District 218 was formed. The population had grown to 2,045 by 1930, and civic improvements were steadily made over the next decade. In 1934, a collection of one hundred books was the beginning of the Oak Lawn Public Library. By 1935, President Franklin D. Roosevelt created the Works Progress Administration as part of the New Deal, which supported a variety of public works, including libraries. With the help of a WPA grant, the new library opened its doors in 1936.

=== Post 1945 ===
After World War II, with veterans returning home and taking advantage of the G.I. Bill, Oak Lawn experienced a major population boom. Beginning in 1949, Oak Lawn Round-Up Days became an annual event and helped to promote the village. It started with 25,000 people, and the Western-themed celebration brought in over 100,000 attendees in 1952. In this year, Jack Brickhouse was master of ceremonies, and the parade was televised on WGN-TV. By 1957, Round-Up Days had become too large, and the next year a final scaled-down version was held.

In the 1950s, a village managerial government began, and a new library and fire station were constructed. By 1960, there were nearly 20,000 residents in Oak Lawn.

On April 21, 1967, a tornado touched down in Oak Lawn that is recorded as one of the worst to strike an urban area. Roughly 900 buildings were damaged or destroyed, and over 30 people were killed.

The town was rebuilt in the coming years, and witnessed further population growth, peaking at 63,500 between 1973 and 1976. However, there was a decrease in residents in the 1980s, and an aging population led to the closure of several schools during this time. In response, the village began a process of redevelopment to counteract the decrease. This redevelopment has focused primarily on businesses and structures in the core area of Oak Lawn, around 95th Street between Cicero Avenue and Central Avenue.

=== 1967 tornado ===
On April 21, 1967, the F4 tornado touched down at 105th Street and Kean Avenue in Palos Hills, 5 miles (8 km) west of Oak Lawn. There were no deaths in Palos Hills, although a number of homes were destroyed and two transmission towers collapsed. After rising from the ground, the tornado touched down again at the Starlite Drive-In Theater at 6400 West 95th Street. With winds estimated to be over 200 miles per hour (320 km/h), the tornado tore through Oak Lawn, tossing cars and buses in the air. After cutting Oak Lawn Community High School in half, it caused damage to St. Gerald's and continued to 91st Street and Cicero Avenue, heavily damaging the Airway Trailer Park and the Oak Lawn Roller Rink before rising from ground level. It touched down again in nearby Hometown, Evergreen Park, and Chicago before dissipating over Lake Michigan. In just 16 minutes, the storm left a 16-mile (26 km) path of destruction and over 30 people dead.

=== Downtown redevelopment ===
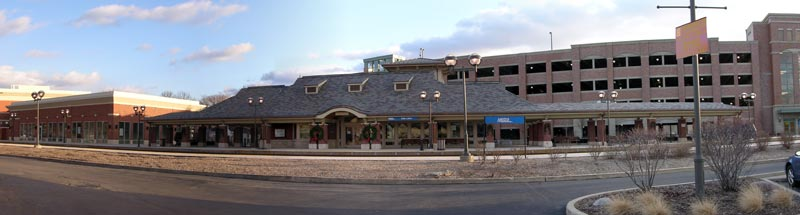
Oak Lawn Metra station

Starting in 2002, downtown Oak Lawn (95th Street between Tulley Avenue and 55th Court) became the target of a massive redevelopment program; properties on the north and south sides of 95th Street were demolished. Eventually, several square blocks were leveled, making room for several multistory, high-end condominium complexes with retail space on the main floors. Part of the project was the expansion of the Metra commuter train station that houses a retail/office center and a new children's museum. This complex also includes a multistory parking garage. Downtown Oak Lawn as seen today bears little resemblance to the downtown from 2002. It now features modern high-rise buildings, new shopping areas, a large contemporary Metra train station, and several new retail and service facilities.

== Geography ==
According to the 2010 census, Oak Lawn has a total area of 8.59 square miles (22.25 km^{2}), all land.

== Demographics ==
Historical population
Census	Pop.	Note	%±
1910	287		—
1920	489		70.4%
1930	2,045		318.2%
1940	3,483		70.3%
1950	8,751		151.2%
1960	27,471		213.9%
1970	60,305		119.5%
1980	60,590		0.5%
1990	56,182		−7.3%
2000	55,245		−1.7%
2010	56,690		2.6%
2020	58,362		2.9%
U.S. Decennial Census; 2010 2020

=== Racial and ethnic composition ===
Oak Lawn village, Illinois – Racial and ethnic composition Note: the US Census treats Hispanic/Latino as an ethnic category. This table excludes Latinos from the racial categories and assigns them to a separate category. Hispanics/Latinos may be of any race.
Race / Ethnicity (NH = Non-Hispanic)	Pop 2000	Pop 2010	Pop 2020	% 2000	% 2010	% 2020
White alone (NH)	49,689	43,680	37,499	89.94%	77.05%	64.25%
Black or African American alone (NH)	666	2,893	4,335	1.21%	5.10%	7.43%
Native American or Alaska Native alone (NH)	59	54	84	0.11%	0.10%	0.14%
Asian alone (NH)	941	1,207	1,630	1.70%	2.13%	2.79%
Pacific Islander alone (NH)	5	14	6	0.01%	0.02%	0.01%
Some Other Race alone (NH)	31	76	204	0.06%	0.13%	0.35%
Mixed race or Multiracial (NH)	912	658	1,437	1.65%	1.16%	2.46%
Hispanic or Latino (any race)	2,942	8,108	13,167	5.33%	14.30%	22.56%
Total	55,245	56,690	58,362	100.00%	100.00%	100.00%

=== 2020 census ===
As of the 2020 census, Oak Lawn had a population of 58,362. The median age was 40.3 years. 21.6% of residents were under the age of 18 and 18.4% of residents were 65 years of age or older. For every 100 females there were 94.2 males, and for every 100 females age 18 and over there were 90.7 males age 18 and over.

100.0% of residents lived in urban areas, while 0.0% lived in rural areas.

There were 22,383 households and 13,544 families in Oak Lawn, and 29.2% of households had children under the age of 18 living in them. Of all households, 46.7% were married-couple households, 18.1% were households with a male householder and no spouse or partner present, and 30.4% were households with a female householder and no spouse or partner present. About 30.1% of all households were made up of individuals and 14.2% had someone living alone who was 65 years of age or older.

There were 23,362 housing units, of which 4.2% were vacant. The homeowner vacancy rate was 1.6% and the rental vacancy rate was 6.1%. The population density was 6,809.24 inhabitants per square mile (2,629.06/km^{2}), and the housing unit density was 2,725.70 per square mile (1,052.40/km^{2}).

=== Income and poverty ===
The median income for a household in the village was $83,911, and the median income for a family was $120,254. Married-couple families had a median income of $130,465. Males had a median earnings of $64,914 versus $44,142 for females. The per capita income for the village was $41,927. About 9.6% of the population was below the poverty line.

== Parks and recreation ==
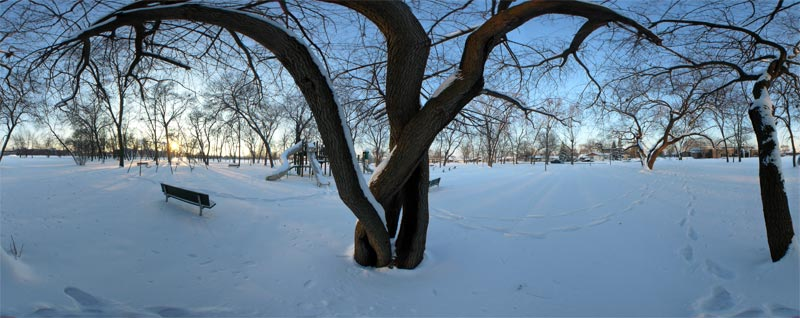
Centennial Park

Oak Lawn maintains an expansive park system. From small corner play lots to the 38-acre (150,000 m^{2}) Centennial Park, there are over 300 acres (1.2 km^{2}) of parks, recreational facilities and open land. These include playgrounds, walking paths, baseball fields, basketball, volleyball and tennis courts, plus outdoor swimming pools, an indoor ice arena, two fitness centers, indoor racquet center, and an 18-hole golf course. Each area in Oak Lawn has its own recreational area, totaling 22 parks.

== Education ==
Oak Lawn has public education schooling children from K–5 in its many elementary schools, including Kolb, Lieb, Harnew, Columbus Manor, Covington, Hannum, Hometown, Kolmar, and Sward. Oak Lawn has two public middle schools: Simmons Middle School, and Oak Lawn-Hometown Middle School.

There are two public high schools, Oak Lawn Community High School and Harold L. Richards High School.

The Roman Catholic Archdiocese of Chicago operates Catholic schools. Catholic grammar schools include St. Germaine, St. Catherine, St. Linus, and St. Gerald. St. Louis de Montfort School closed in 2017 with 133 students that year.

== Infrastructure ==
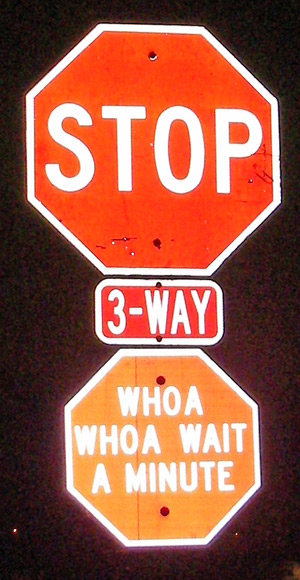
A former Oak Lawn stop sign

Oak Lawn has a commuter railroad station on Metra's SouthWest Service line with service to downtown Chicago and Manhattan, Illinois. It has connections to two Pace routes, while other routes run along the village borders.

=== Stop sign program ===
In mid-2007, Oak Lawn began hanging additional messages to village stop signs in an attempt to have drivers obey the signs. The signs were the idea of Village President Dave Heilmann, with local residents encouraged to submit ideas. Found throughout the village, the signs garnered attention with the press and were not well received by residents, nor did they noticeably impact public safety. While considered humorous by some, many others considered it a publicity stunt at tax payer's expense.

The Federal Highway Administration (FHWA) and IDOT voiced their concerns about the use of these nonconforming stop signs and the village removed them in April 2008. Initially, the Village President refused to remove the signs until IDOT threatened to withhold millions of dollars in funding for infrastructure.

== Notable people ==
- Diandra Asbaty (born 1980), professional bowler; Team USA member and spokesperson for USBC
- Brian Bogusevic (born 1984), former outfielder for Chicago Cubs
- Tim Byrdak (born 1973), Major League Baseball pitcher 1998 to 2013; born in Oak Lawn
- Kevin Cronin (born 1951), lead vocalist for rock band REO Speedwagon
- David Diehl (born 1980), football player, two-time Super Bowl champion for New York Giants
- Mark Donahue, football player, lineman for Cincinnati Bengals, two-time Consensus All-American at University of Michigan
- Dan Donegan, guitarist for rock band Disturbed
- John Joseph Duda, actor; born in Oak Lawn
- Michael Flatley (born 1958), Irish step dancer; attended St. Linus and Brother Rice High School
- Jack Gwynne, illusionist and actor, died in Oak Lawn (1969)
- Richard Hanania, right-wing author and academic
- David A. Johnston, volcanologist, killed during 1980 Mount St. Helens eruption
- Benn Jordan, recording artist known as The Flashbulb; attended Oak Lawn Community High School
- C.J. Kupec, basketball player, Oak Lawn High School star, played for Michigan and NBA's Los Angeles Lakers
- Sean Lewis, college football coach, attended Harold L. Richards High School
- Rob Mackowiak, player for several Major League Baseball teams
- Bobby Madritsch, former pitcher for Seattle Mariners
- Rory Markham, UFC and IFL mixed martial arts fighter
- Mike Mollo, heavyweight boxer
- Bryan Rekar, former pitcher for Colorado Rockies, Tampa Bay Devil Rays, and Kansas City Royals; born in Oak Lawn
- Michael A. Ruddy, Illinois state representative and businessman, lived in Oak Lawn
- Marc Rzepczynski, pitcher for Seattle Mariners; born in Oak Lawn
- Dwyane Wade, former NBA player and three-time NBA champion with Miami Heat, attended Richards High School in Oak Lawn
- Kanye West, musician, rapper, singer, songwriter, record producer, and fashion designer
- Juice WRLD, rapper, died in Oak Lawn (2019)
- Harry Yourell, Illinois state representative and businessman
