= Wabash Railroad 6th district =

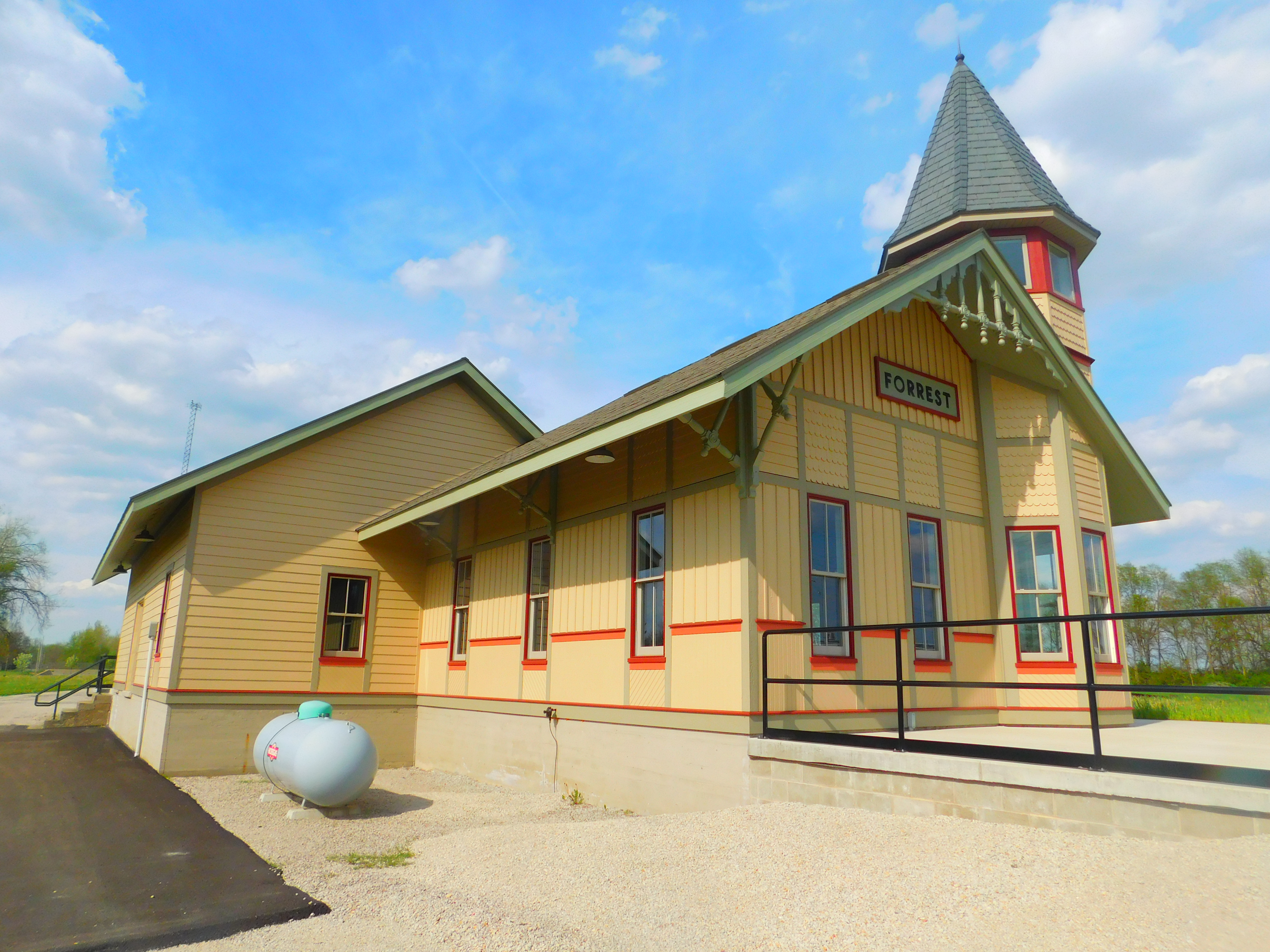
- Wabash Railroad depot, Forrest, Illinois

Overview
- Owner: Wabash Railroad
- Locale: Illinois
- Termini: Chicago; Forrest, Illinois

Service
- Type: Inter-city rail Commuter rail Freight rail

History
- Opened: 1880
- Closed: 1991 (part abandoned)

Technical
- Line length: 84 mi (135 km)
- Number of tracks: 2 / 1
- Track gauge: 1,435 mm (4 ft 8 1/2 in) standard gauge

The Wabash Railroad 6th district was an 84-mile subdivision of the Wabash Railroad running from the city of Chicago to Forrest, Illinois. The line formed a part of the Wabash Railroad's route from Chicago to St. Louis, crossing the Kankakee River in Will County at Custer Park. From Forrest, the route continued south over the Wabash 7th district line to Bement, Illinois, where it joined the Wabash mainline to St Louis. Though mostly abandoned after 1990, a 32-mile section of the line remains in service as the route of the Chicago Metra's SouthWest Service.

== History ==
In May 1879, seeking a direct route from St Louis to Chicago, the Wabash Railroad acquired the Chicago and Paducah Railroad, a local line connecting the Wabash mainline at Bement, to Pontiac, Illinois. The following month, the Wabash Railroad board approved an extension from this line, beginning in Livingston County, at Strawn, building northward to Chicago, a total distance of 91 miles. At its northern end, the line made a junction with the Chicago and Western Indiana Railroad on Lake Township's 75th street, now the Chicago neighborhood of Englewood. The junction granted Wabash trains access to the Chicago and Western's Dearborn Station terminal downtown. Construction completed in a little over a year, with the first southbound train leaving Chicago on August 1, 1880.

While construction of the northern extension began at Strawn, the new district division point was set at Forrest, seven miles to the north, where the line crossed the existing east–west route of the Toledo, Peoria and Western Railway.

The line approached Chicago through the townships of Manattan and Orland, where the communities of Manhattan (1886) and Orland Park (1892) were incorporated in the years following the line's opening. Later incorporations along the route included Oak Lawn (1909), and Chicago Ridge, Worth and Palos Park (all incorporated 1914). After 1940, a connection was added to the Elwood Ordnance Plant, later better known as the Joliet Arsenal.

During the streamliner era, this route was served by the Blue Bird and Banner Blue express services from Chicago to St Louis.
