= Chicago Ridge Mall =

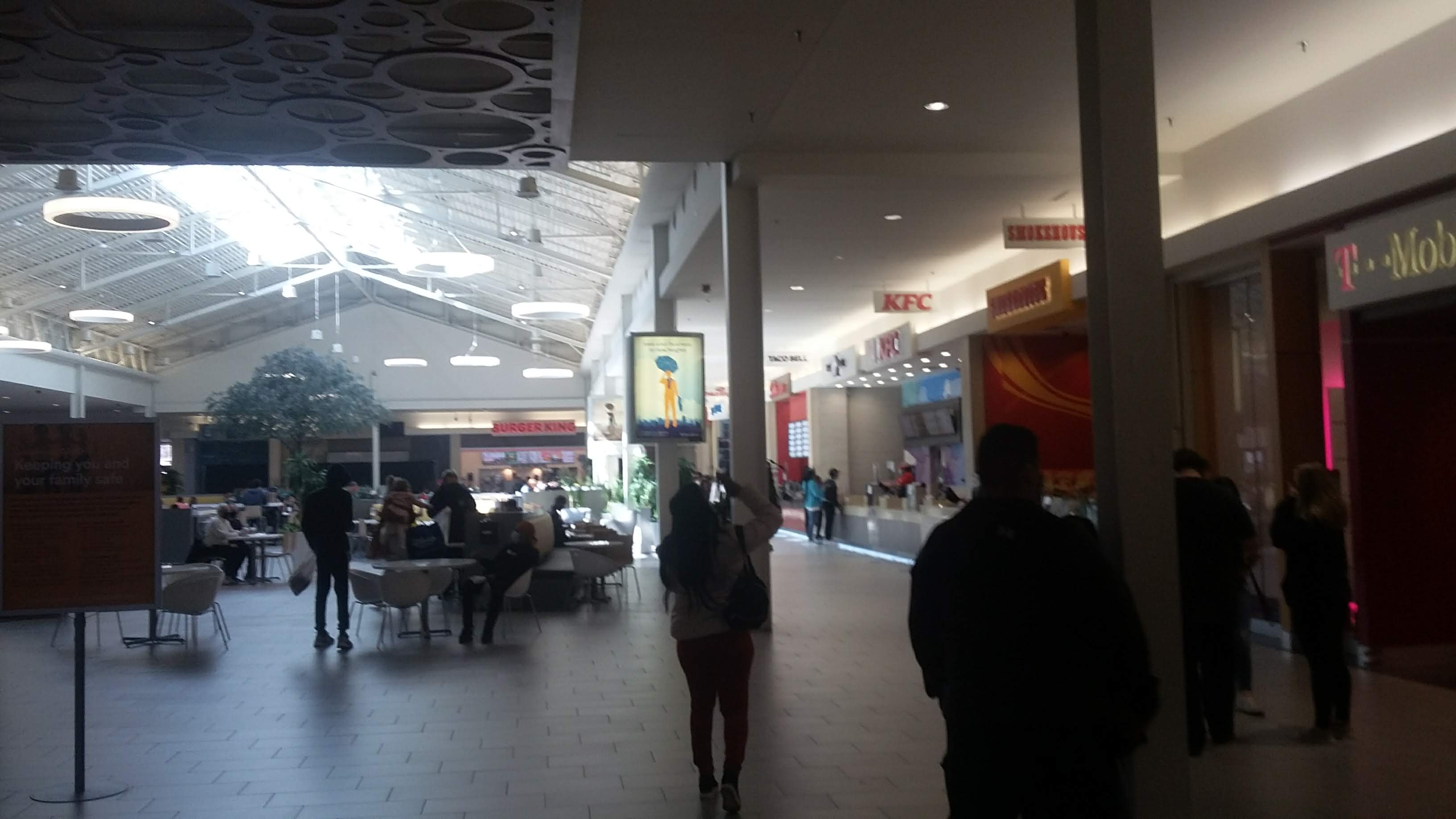
- Location: Chicago Ridge, Illinois, United States
- Coordinates: 41.716°N 87.782°W
- Address: 444 Chicago Ridge Mall
- Opened: 1981
- Developer: Shopco, Tucker Cos.
- Manager: JLL
- Owner: Second Horizon Capital
- Num. of stores: 119
- Num. of anchor tenants: 4
- Floor area: 889,610 sq ft (82,647 m^{2})
- Floors: 1 (2 in H&M, former Sears, and former Carson's)
- Public transit: Pace
- Website: www.shoppingchicagoridgemall.com

Chicago Ridge Mall, formerly Westfield Chicago Ridge from 2004 to 2012, is a shopping mall in Chicago Ridge, Illinois. The mall features Kohl's, Dick's Sporting Goods, Burlington, as its anchor stores. The mall also has four junior anchors: Aldi, Old Navy, Michaels, and AMC Theatres. The mall also features a food court and the restaurants of Buffalo Wild Wings, Chili's and Chick-fil-A. The mall was built in 1981, and was expanded in 1986. In April 2012, Westfield sold the mall to Starwood Capital Group, with JLL responsible for management. In 2024, Starwood Capital sold the property to Second Horizon Capital.

== History ==
The Chicago Ridge Mall began construction in 1980 as a $50 billion project at the site of the former Starlite Drive-In Theatre, which closed in 1979 after a 31-year run. The entire mall opened in 1981. The Lenhdorff Group bought the mall in 1986 and sold it to JMB Realty a year later.

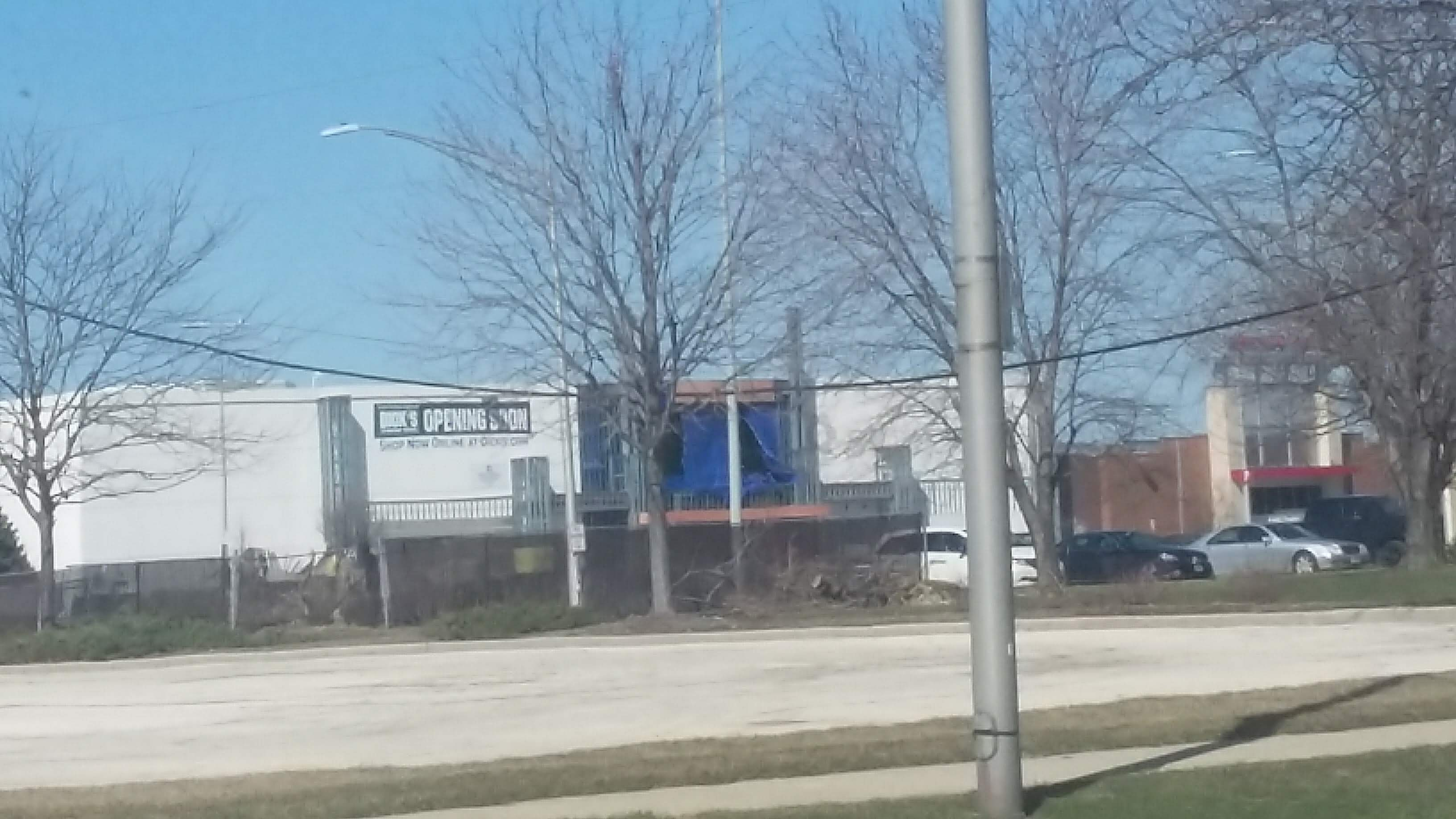
Construction of Dick's Sporting Goods

In July 1981, Essaness Theatres opened its triplex cinema at the mall, which later became a six-screen theater. The theatre later became Cineplex Odeon, then Loews, and finally AMC.

In 1987, a two-story Carson Pirie Scott store opened. In 1993, Montgomery Ward was added as an anchor in the space previously occupied by Madigan's. The Montgomery Ward space later became Bed Bath & Beyond and Steve & Barry's, the latter of which closed in 2008. In 2010, Westfield Group confirmed that Aldi would open in 2011 in the space vacated by Steve and Barry's.

In August 2015, a two-story H&M opened. Red Robin opened on November 21, 2016.

On April 18, 2018, it was announced that the Carson's store would be closing because parent company The Bon-Ton Stores was going out of business. The store closed on August 29, 2018.

On June 17, 2020, plans were announced for Dick's Sporting Goods to open in the lower level of the former Carson's space. The store opened on August 6, 2021.

On February 12, 2021, it was announced that Sears would also be closing as part of a plan to close 32 stores nationwide. The store closed on May 2, 2021.

On July 23, 2021, it was announced that the Disney Store would be closing as part of a plan to close at least 60 stores nationwide. The store closed on August 18, 2021. It was the last location with the original 1990s "pink and green" design.

On January 31, 2023, it was announced that Bed Bath & Beyond would close as part of a plan to close 87 stores nationwide, leaving Kohl's and Dick's Sporting Goods as the only anchors left.

In March 2024, Burlington announced that it would open on May 31, 2024. The store opened in the space formerly occupied by Bed Bath & Beyond.

In the 2020s, Bargain closeouts began renovating the former Sears building into a discount store. The company announced they would open a discount store and operate out of the entire former Sears and the store eventually opened. Bargain Discounts has deals at the store a high as 75% off items.

== Bus routes ==
Pace

- 381 95th Street
- 384 Narragansett/Ridgeland
- 395 95th/Dan Ryan CTA/UPS Hodgkins (Weekday UPS shifts only)
