= Michael A. Ruddy =

American politician and businessman

Member of the Illinois House of Representatives

Personal details
- Party: Republican

Michael A. Ruddy (September 2, 1900–June 2, 1987) was an American politician and businessman.

Ruddy was born in Chicago, Illinois. He went to the Chicago parochial and public schools. Ruddy was involved with the manufacturing and retail business. Ruddy served in the Illinois House of Representatives from 1929 to 1967 and was involved with the Republican Party. Ruddy died at his home in Oak Lawn, Illinois.
