= SouthWest Service =

Metra route to Manhattan, Illinois

- SouthWest Service train at Manhattan, September 2026.

Overview
- Owner: Norfolk Southern Railway (Leased to Metra)
- Termini: Union Station; Manhattan
- Stations: 13
- Website: metra.com/train-lines/sws

Service
- Type: Commuter rail
- System: Metra
- Operator(s): Metra, Norfolk Southern Railway
- Daily ridership: 9,600 (Avg. Weekday 2014)
- Ridership: 1,108,399 (2025)

Technical
- Track length: 40.6 miles
- Track gauge: 4 ft 8 1/2 in (1,435 mm) standard gauge
Route map
SouthWest Service highlighted in blue
Key

The SouthWest Service (SWS) is a Metra commuter rail line, running southwest from Union Station in downtown Chicago, Illinois, to Manhattan, Illinois. Metra does not refer to its lines by color, but the timetable accents for the SouthWest Service line are "Banner Blue," for the Wabash Railroad's Banner Blue passenger train. The trackage is owned by Metra north of a junction with the Belt Railway of Chicago at Loomis Boulevard, and is leased from Norfolk Southern Railway south of the junction (NS has trackage rights over Metra's portion).

== History ==
The line south of the curve at the east end of the section aligned with 75th Street was the Wabash Railroad 6th district subdivision, completed in 1880 by the Wabash, St. Louis and Pacific Railway. That 75th Street curve was a junction with the Chicago and Western Indiana Railroad, of which the Wabash owned one-fifth, used to reach Dearborn Station in downtown Chicago. Commuter service from Chicago began as early as 1893, with trains running as far south as Orland Park, and by 1909, the service had been extended with several trains operating as far south as Manhattan. The level of service deteriorated in the 1930s, with commuter operations effectively reduced to one train in each direction making local stops from Chicago to Decatur. By 1964, the once daily Chicago–Decatur trains were cut back to Orland Park.

After several reorganizations the Wabash Railroad was leased by the Norfolk and Western Railway on October 16, 1964. The single round trip continued under the new ownership, who named the train the Orland Park Cannonball. On May 1, 1971, Amtrak assumed control of most intercity passenger trains in the United States. On this date all intercity services operating into and out of Chicago were either routed into Union Station or discontinued, leaving the single Orland Park Cannonball as the only train to still use Dearborn Station. Dearborn Station closed, but the commuter train continued to use a small platform and track on the property until 1976 when it relocated to Union Station via a new connection at Alton Junction.

The Regional Transportation Authority began to subsidize the service in 1978. N&W merged with Southern Railway to form the Norfolk Southern Railway in 1982, and for the next decade the line was known as the Norfolk Southern Line (NS). The RTA closed the Western Avenue station on May 15, 1984, as part of a cost reduction plan which saw the closure of twelve other lightly used stations and the removal of ticket agents from an additional seventeen stations across the system. On June 1, 1993 Metra took over operations and renamed it the SouthWest Service.

The rail line expansion project, which includes 11 miles (18 km) of new track and at least two additional train stations, was completed (except for the Laraway Road station) in January 2006. The number of trains per day was doubled from 16 to 30, 15 in each direction. For years, Pace operated Route 835, whose bus service enhanced the limited train service in the SouthWest Service corridor. With the rail service expansion, ridership on route 835 became so poor that Pace eliminated it on August 17, 2007.

Metra started Saturday service on March 21, 2009, with six trains between Union Station and Manhattan.

== Future ==
SouthWest Service trains will shift from Union Station to LaSalle Street Station with the reconfiguration of the 75th Street Corridor under the auspices of the Chicago Region Environmental and Transportation Efficiency Program (CREATE). A third mainline track will also be built between LaSalle St Station and 74th to handle the increase in traffic. In addition, LaSalle Street station will be expanded. This would relieve congestion at Union Station and improve reliability for the SouthWest Service as well as allow more trains to run in each direction.

== Service frequency ==
As of February 15, 2024, Metra operates 30 trains (15 in each direction) on the SouthWest Service Line on weekdays. Of these, five trains operate to and from Manhattan and 10 operate to and from Orland Park 179th Street. Three of the trains that travel beyond 179th Street serve Laraway Road and Manhattan as "flag to discharge" stops.

Since March 2020 and as of May 2026, Saturday service on the SouthWest Service is currently suspended. There is also no service on Sundays or holidays.

The Laraway Road and Manhattan stations see a combined ridership of under 60 people daily, making them two of the least-used stations on Metra's system.

== Ridership ==
Since 2014 annual ridership has declined from 2,659,040 to 2,356,767, an overall decline of 11.4%. Due to the COVID-19 pandemic, ridership dropped to 574,815 passengers in 2020. It has seen a steady recovery since 2021, but still remains below pre-pandemic levels. The line's 1,108,399 riders in 2025 made it the ninth busiest Metra line.

== Stations ==
County	Zone	Location	Station	Connections and notes
Cook	1	Chicago	Union Station	Amtrak (long-distance): California Zephyr, Cardinal, City of New Orleans, Empire Builder, Floridian, Lake Shore Limited, Southwest Chief, Texas Eagle; Amtrak (intercity): Borealis, Hiawatha, Illinois Service, Michigan Services; Metra: BNSF, Heritage Corridor, Milwaukee District North, Milwaukee District West, North Central Service; Chicago "L": Blue (at Clinton), Brown Orange Pink Purple (at Quincy); CTA buses: 1 7 J14 19 28 56 60 120 121 124 125 126 128 130 151 156 157 192; Pace: 755; Amtrak Thruway: Chicago–Madison and Chicago–Rockford (Van Galder), Chicago–Louisville (Greyhound)
Cook		Chicago	Dearborn Station	Closed 1976, service switched to Union Station
Cook		Chicago	47th Street	Closed July 29, 1979
Cook		Chicago	Englewood	Closed July 29, 1979
Cook		Chicago	Halsted	Closed July 29, 1979
Cook		Chicago	Racine	Closed July 29, 1979
Cook		Chicago	Ashland	Closed July 29, 1979
Cook		Chicago	Western Avenue	Closed May 1984
Cook	2	Chicago	Wrightwood	CTA buses: 52A 79; Previously known as Landers
Cook	2	Chicago	Ashburn	
Cook	3	Oak Lawn	Oak Lawn Patriot	Pace: 381, 395, 769
Cook	3	Chicago Ridge	Chicago Ridge	Pace: 384
Cook	3	Worth	Worth	Pace: 385, 386
Cook	3	Palos Heights	Palos Heights	Pace: 769
Cook	4	Palos Park	Palos Park	
Cook	4	Orland Park		
Cook	4	Orland Park	Southmore	Closed between 1976 and 1984
Cook	4	Orland Park	143rd Street/Orland Park	Pace: 379
Cook	4	Orland Park	153rd Street/Orland Park	
Cook	4	Orland Park	179th Street/Orland Park	
Will		New Lenox	Steele	Closed 1962
Will		New Lenox	Brisbane	Closed 1962
Will	4	New Lenox	Laraway Road/New Lenox	
Will	4	Manhattan	Manhattan	
