= Pleasant Ridge Township, Livingston County, Illinois =

Coordinates: 40°47′52″N 88°24′37″W

Pleasant Ridge Township
- Township
- Location in Livingston County

- Livingston County's location in Illinois
- Country: United States
- State: Illinois
- County: Livingston
- Established: April 1859

Area
  - Total: 29.32 sq mi (75.9 km^{2})
  - Land: 29.32 sq mi (75.9 km^{2})
  - Water: 0 sq mi (0 km^{2}) 0%

Population (2020)
  - Total: 256
  - Density: 8.73/sq mi (3.37/km^{2})
- Time zone: UTC-6 (CST)
  - Summer (DST): UTC-5 (CDT)
- FIPS code: 17-105-60612

Pleasant Ridge Township is located in Livingston County, Illinois. As of the 2020 census, its population was 256 and it contained 87 housing units. Pleasant Ridge Township formed from Saunemin Township in April, 1859.

== Geography ==
According to the 2021 census gazetteer files, Pleasant Ridge Township has a total area of 29.32 square miles (75.94 km^{2}), all land.

== Demographics ==
As of the 2020 census there were 256 people, 72 households, and 56 families residing in the township. The population density was 8.73 inhabitants per square mile (3.37/km^{2}). There were 87 housing units at an average density of 2.97 per square mile (1.15/km^{2}). The racial makeup of the township was 96.09% White, 0.00% African American, 0.78% Native American, 0.00% Asian, 0.00% Pacific Islander, 1.95% from other races, and 1.17% from two or more races. Hispanic or Latino of any race were 2.73% of the population.

There were 72 households, out of which 44.40% had children under the age of 18 living with them, 77.78% were married couples living together, 0.00% had a female householder with no spouse present, and 22.22% were non-families. 22.20% of all households were made up of individuals, and 6.90% had someone living alone who was 65 years of age or older. The average household size was 3.75 and the average family size was 4.54.

The township's age distribution consisted of 53.0% under the age of 18, 0.0% from 18 to 24, 23.8% from 25 to 44, 6.7% from 45 to 64, and 16.7% who were 65 years of age or older. The median age was 14.9 years. For every 100 females, there were 114.3 males. For every 100 females age 18 and over, there were 149.0 males.

The median income for a household in the township was $68,594, and the median income for a family was $69,844. Males had a median income of $67,813 versus $6,406 for females. The per capita income for the township was $17,468. About 0.0% of families and 4.1% of the population were below the poverty line, including 0.0% of those under age 18 and 0.0% of those age 65 or over.

Historical population
| Census | Pop. | Note | %± |
|---|---|---|---|
| 2010 | 252 | | — |
| 2020 | 256 | | 1.6% |
U.S. Decennial Census
