= Manhattan, Illinois =

Manhattan
- Village
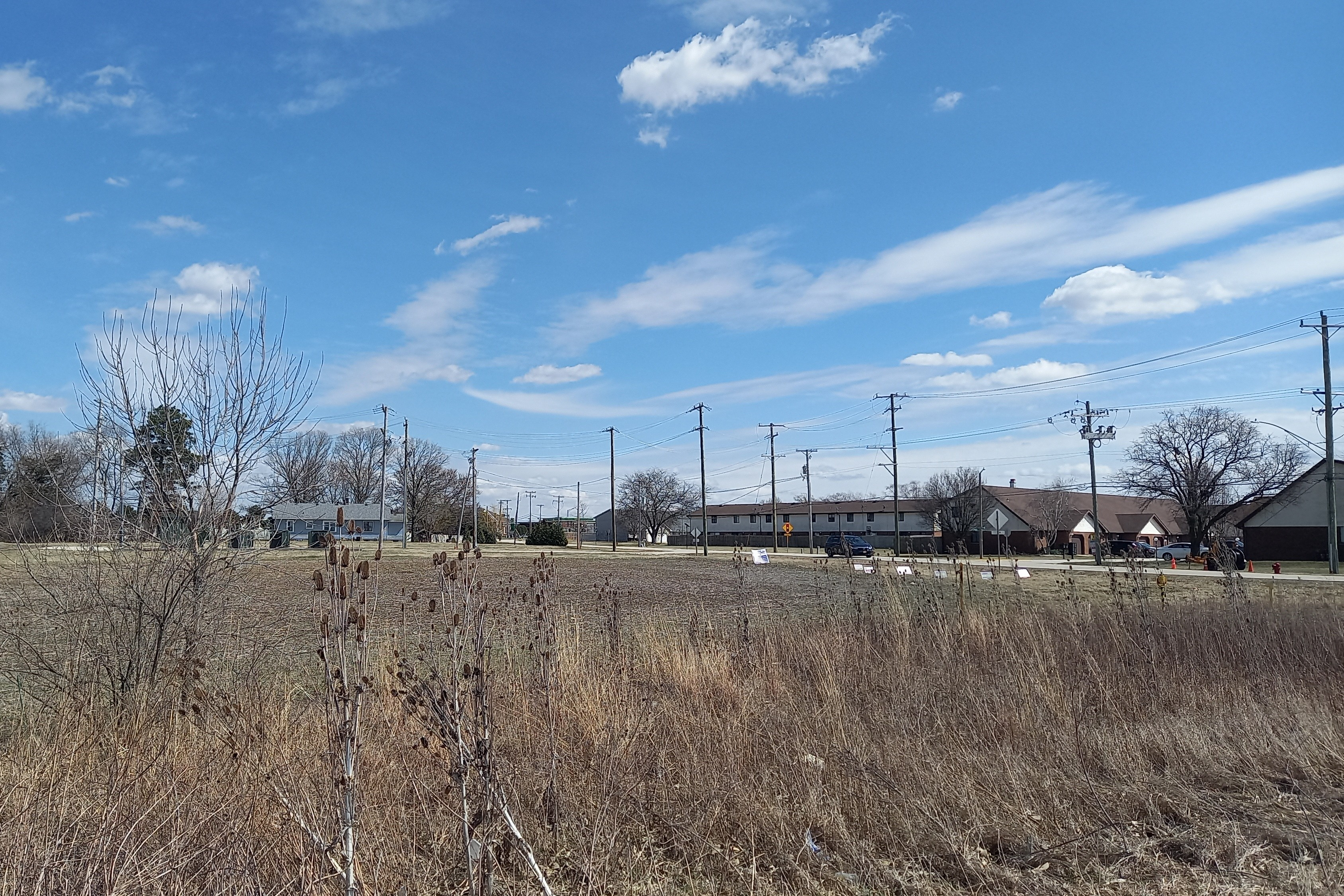
- Manhattan Road, viewed eastward from the Wauponsee Glacial Trail
- Motto: Memories with progress
- Location of Manhattan in Will County, Illinois.

- Location of Illinois in the United States
- Coordinates: 41°25′19″N 87°58′52″W
- Country: United States
- State: Illinois
- County: Will
- Established: 1880
- Incorporated: 1886
- Named for: Manhattan

Government
  - Mayor: Mike Adrieansen

Area
  - Total: 6.68 sq mi (17.30 km^{2})
  - Land: 6.68 sq mi (17.30 km^{2})
  - Water: 0 sq mi (0.00 km^{2})

Population (2020)
  - Total: 9,385
  - Estimate (2024): 10,772
  - Density: 1,404.7/sq mi (542.34/km^{2})
- Time zone: UTC-6 (CST)
  - Summer (DST): UTC-5 (CDT)
- ZIP Code(s): 60442
- Area code: 815
- FIPS code: 17-46357
- Wikimedia Commons: Manhattan, Illinois
- Website: www.villageofmanhattan.org

Manhattan (/mænˈhætən/MANN-haton) is a village in Will County, Illinois. The population was 9,385 at the time of the 2020 census. The U.S. Census Bureau estimates the population to be 10,772 as of July 2024. The community is located in northeastern Illinois approximately 50 miles (80 km) southwest of Chicago.

== History ==
The township was established in 1853.

Manhattan village was established in 1880 as a stop along the Wabash Railroad 6th district, and incorporated in 1886. Its named comes from the New York City borough of Manhattan, which may have been suggested by then-Will County supervisor John Young. Due to railroad construction in the mid-19th century, many immigrants, especially Irish, moved to the area. It was eventually incorporated to obtain a saloon license. Its forebears of German and Irish heritage give expression in the early spring festival Irish Fest.

On May 27, 1917, Manhattan was struck by a tornado as part of the May 25 - June 1, 1917 tornado outbreak, one of the most widespread and deadly on record.

The early morning of June 11, 1925, saw the explosion of a 55,000-barrel crude oil storage tank owned by the Sinclair Oil Corporation just south of Manhattan when it was struck by lightning. The resulting fire was reportedly visible from up to fifty miles away and raged for over twenty-four hours.

== Geography ==
Manhattan is located at 41°25′19″N 87°58′52″W (41.422044, -87.981042).

According to the 2010 census, Manhattan has a total area of 6.57 square miles (17.02 km^{2}), all land.

Manhattan is located along the Wauponsee Glacial Trail that can be accessed at the Manhattan Road Access Point.

== Demographics ==
Historical population
Census	Pop.	Note	%±
1890	257		—
1900	393		52.9%
1910	443		12.7%
1920	525		18.5%
1930	628		19.6%
1940	601		−4.3%
1950	728		21.1%
1960	1,117		53.4%
1970	1,530		37.0%
1980	1,944		27.1%
1990	2,059		5.9%
2000	3,330		61.7%
2010	7,051		111.7%
2020	9,385		33.1%
U.S. Decennial Census

=== Racial and ethnic composition ===
Manhattan village, Illinois – Racial and ethnic composition Note: the US Census treats Hispanic/Latino as an ethnic category. This table excludes Latinos from the racial categories and assigns them to a separate category. Hispanics/Latinos may be of any race.
Race / Ethnicity (NH = Non-Hispanic)	Pop 2000	Pop 2010	Pop 2020	% 2000	% 2010	% 2020
White alone (NH)	3,185	6,404	8,186	95.65%	90.82%	87.22%
Black or African American alone (NH)	7	73	134	0.21%	1.04%	1.43%
Native American or Alaska Native alone (NH)	1	10	11	0.03%	0.14%	0.12%
Asian alone (NH)	7	52	46	0.21%	0.74%	0.49%
Native Hawaiian or Pacific Islander alone (NH)	0	2	0	0.00%	0.03%	0.00%
Other race alone (NH)	0	1	24	0.00%	0.01%	0.26%
Mixed race or Multiracial (NH)	29	64	282	0.87%	0.91%	3.00%
Hispanic or Latino (any race)	101	445	702	3.03%	6.31%	7.48%
Total	3,330	7,051	9,385	100.00%	100.00%	100.00%

=== 2020 census ===
As of the 2020 census, Manhattan had a population of 9,385. The median age was 33.9 years. 31.2% of residents were under the age of 18 and 8.2% of residents were 65 years of age or older. For every 100 females there were 98.2 males, and for every 100 females age 18 and over there were 95.1 males age 18 and over.

There were 3,092 households in Manhattan, of which 49.4% had children under the age of 18 living in them. Of all households, 64.5% were married-couple households, 10.9% were households with a male householder and no spouse or partner present, and 18.2% were households with a female householder and no spouse or partner present. About 14.5% of all households were made up of individuals and 5.2% had someone living alone who was 65 years of age or older.

There were 3,228 housing units, of which 4.2% were vacant. The homeowner vacancy rate was 1.8% and the rental vacancy rate was 5.2%.

95.7% of residents lived in urban areas, while 4.3% lived in rural areas.

=== 2010 census ===
As of the 2010 census, the township population was 9,218 and it contained 3,199 housing units.

=== 2000 census ===
As of the census of 2000, there were 3,330 people, 1,144 households, and 870 families residing in the village. The population density was 989.3 inhabitants per square mile (382.0/km^{2}). There were 1,163 housing units at an average density of 345.5 units per square mile (133.4 units/km^{2}). The racial makeup of the village was 97.21% White, 0.21% African American, 0.12% Native American, 0.21% Asian, 1.17% from other races, and 1.08% from two or more races. Hispanic or Latino of any race were 3.02% of the population.

There were 1,144 households, out of which 46.2% had children under the age of 18 living with them, 65.6% were married couples living together, 7.3% had a female householder with no husband present, and 23.9% were non-families. 20.3% of all households were made up of individuals, and 6.6% had someone living alone who was 65 years of age or older. The average household size was 2.91 and the average family size was 3.41.

In the village, the population was spread out, with 32.4% under the age of 18, 8.0% from 18 to 24, 33.1% from 25 to 44, 19.2% from 45 to 64, and 7.3% who were 65 years of age or older. The median age was 32 years. For every 100 females, there were 103.7 males. For every 100 females age 18 and over, there were 96.3 males.

The median income for a household in the village was $55,559, and the median income for a family was $62,865. Males had a median income of $50,174 versus $30,865 for females. The per capita income for the village was $21,666. About 1.0% of families and 3.6% of the population were below the poverty line, including 0.7% of those under age 18 and 4.7% of those age 65 or over.

== Education ==
The majority of the village of Manhattan is served by Manhattan School District 114, one of the higher-achieving districts in Illinois. Four schools lie in this district. Wilson Creek Elementary School serves grades K through 1, Anna McDonald School serves grades 2 through 3, Manhattan Intermediate School serves grade 4 through 5, and Manhattan Junior High School serves grades 6 through 8.

High school-aged students in the village of Manhattan who are in District 114 are in the Lincoln Way Community High School District 210. They attend Lincoln-Way West High School in nearby New Lenox.

Southern parts of the village limits are in the Peotone Community Unit School District 207U.

== Civic organizations ==
Manhattan is served by American Legion Post number 935 and the Lions Club. In addition, Manhattan is served by the Boy Scouts of America, Rainbow Council, Troop 155, and Cub Scouts Pack 155.

== Transportation ==
Manhattan station on Metra's SouthWest Service provides weekday rail service to Chicago's Union Station. Manhattan is the southern terminus of the line.

U.S. Route 52 is the only numbered highway serving Manhattan; US 52 runs in the northwest–southeast direction through Manhattan.
