= 143rd Street/Orland Park station =

Commuter rail station in Orland Park, Illinois

143rd Street/Orland Park

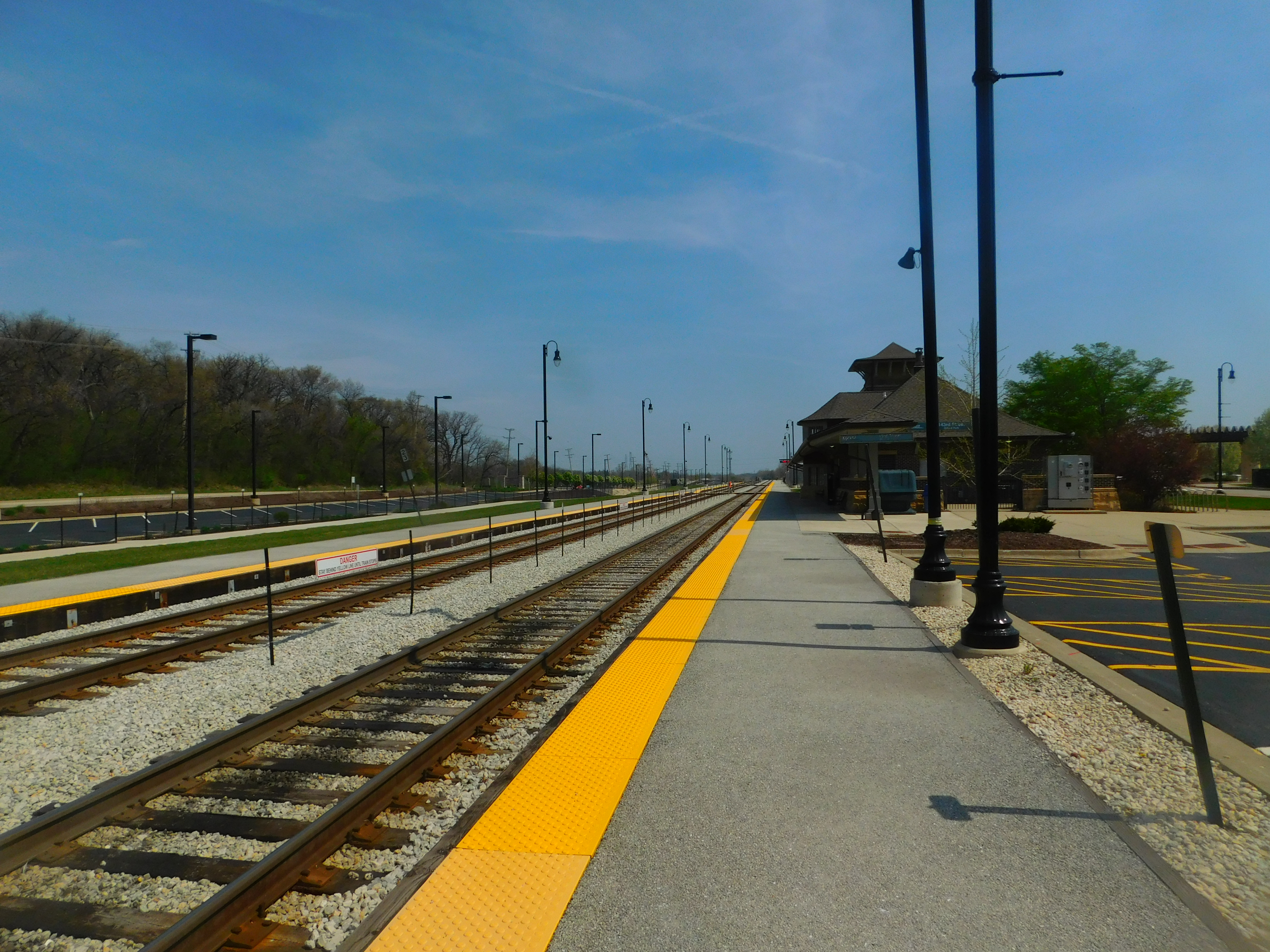
- 143rd Street station in Orland Park in April 2016

General information
- Location: 143rd Street & Southwest Highway; Orland Park, Illinois
- Coordinates: 41.6309°N 87.8592°W
- Owner: Metra
- Platforms: 2 side platforms
- Tracks: 2

Construction
- Accessible: Yes

Other information
- Fare zone: 4

History
- Rebuilt: April 27, 2007
- Former names: Orland Park

Passengers
- 2018: 591 (average weekday) ▲7.8%
- Rank: 86 out of 236

Services
Preceding station	Metra	Following station
153rd Street/Orland Park toward Manhattan	SouthWest Service	Palos Park toward Union Station
Former services
Preceding station	Norfolk and Western Railway	Following station
Terminus	Orland Park Cannonball	Southmore toward Chicago
Preceding station	Wabash Railroad	Following station
Alpine toward Kansas City	Main Line	Palos Park toward Chicago
Track layout
Location

143rd Street/Orland Park is one of three stations on Metra's SouthWest Service in Orland Park, Illinois. The station is 23 miles (37 km) away from Chicago Union Station, the northern terminus of the line. In Metra's zone-based fare system, 143rd Street is in zone 4. As of 2018, 143rd Street is the 86th busiest of Metra's 236 non-downtown stations, with an average of 591 weekday boardings.

As of February 15, 2024, 143rd Street/Orland Park is served by all 30 trains (15 in each direction) on weekdays. One of the outbound trains that stops at the station makes a flag stop. Saturday service is currently suspended.

The station faced major reconstruction and reopened on April 27, 2007. From this station southward the SouthWest Service operates on one track only.

This station has been recognized as being a major piece in Orland Park's downtown.

== Connections ==
- Pace Bus route 379
