= Manhattan station =

Commuter rail station in Manhattan, Illinois

Manhattan

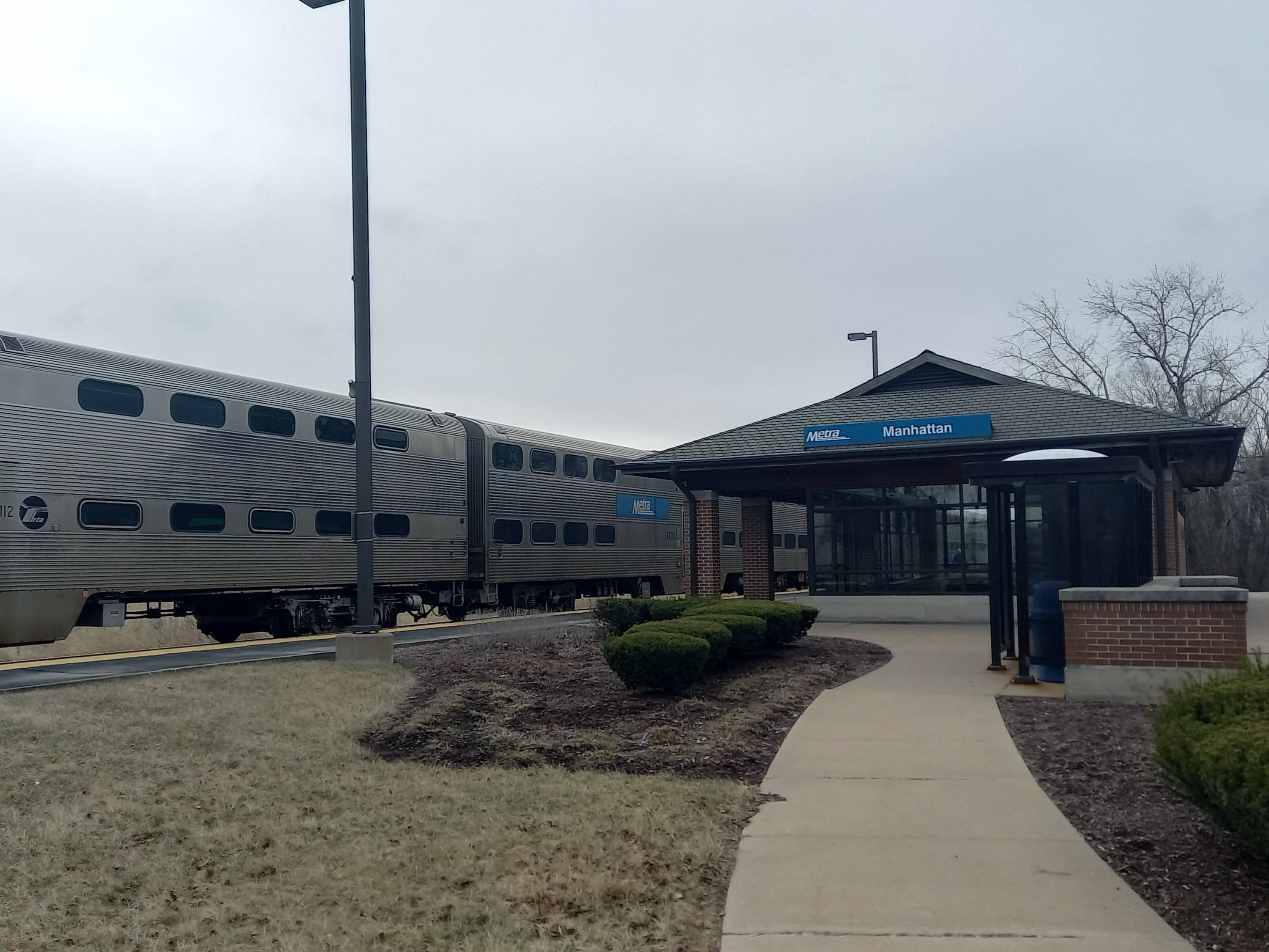
- Manhattan station in March 2025

General information
- Location: 15601 West Sweedler Road; Manhattan, Illinois
- Coordinates: 41.4186°N 87.9890°W
- Owner: Metra
- Platforms: 1 side platform
- Tracks: 1

Construction
- Accessible: Yes

Other information
- Fare zone: 4

History
- Opened: 1880 (Wabash); January 30, 2006 (Metra)
- Closed: 1962 (Wabash)

Passengers
- 2018: 19 (average weekday) ▼13.6%
- Rank: 228 out of 236

Services
Preceding station	Metra	Following station
Terminus	SouthWest Service	Laraway Road toward Union Station
Former services
Preceding station	Wabash Railroad	Following station
Symerton toward Kansas City	Main Line	Brisbane toward Chicago
Track layout
Location

Manhattan is a commuter railroad station on Metra's SouthWest Service located in the town of Manhattan, Illinois. The station is the southern terminus of the line. The Manhattan station opened on January 30, 2006, as part of a southern extension of the SouthWest Service. In Metra's zone-based fare system, Manhattan is in zone 4 and is located 40.3 miles (64.9 km) from Chicago Union Station, the northern terminus of the line. It is the southernmost station of the entire Metra system. As of 2018, Manhattan is the 227th busiest of Metra's 236 non-downtown stations, with an average of 19 weekday boardings. The station's rank is tied with the neighboring Laraway Road station.

As of February 15, 2024, Manhattan is served by 10 trains (five in each direction) on weekdays. Three of the outbound trains that stop at the station make a flag stop to discharge all remaining passengers. All trains that serve Manhattan originate or terminate here. Saturday service is currently suspended.

Manhattan station consists of a station house and one platform serving a single track; the SouthWest Service operates on only one track from Orland Park 143rd Street southward.

== Station layout ==
The Manhattan station consists of a single track and a single platform. The platform has an enclosed shelter that is open 24/7 but has no staffed ticket window. The single track is long enough to accommodate out-of-service trains, but due to the station's low train volume, most trains simply arrive and depart. One freight train, the Norfolk Southern Manhattan Local, runs on the track that splits off from the Manhattan station to the Manhattan Oil Refinery.
