= List of historical passenger rail services in Chicago =

During the heyday of rail transportation in the first half of the 20th century, Chicago, Illinois, reigned as the undisputed railroad center of the United States and was served by six intercity train terminals at its peak. With the decline of passenger rail in the United States, service was consolidated at Union Station with inter-city Amtrak trains. Commuter railroad Metra continues passenger service at LaSalle Street Station, Millennium Station, and Ogilvie Transportation Center, as well as Union Station. Three Metra services are operated by the Union Pacific Railroad, while another is operated by the BNSF Railway. The South Shore Line, an independent commuter/interurban line operates out of Millennium Station. Most of the terminals that were in the downtown area were called the "Chicago Loop". Ogilvie Station and Union Station were west of the Chicago River and the Loop; Wells Station was north of the river and the Loop.

The table below shows all railroads that have served downtown Chicago and what terminal they used.

Services partially replaced by or wholly discontinued with Amtrak are marked in Bold.

Railroads	Successor railroad	Union (PRR)	C&NW / Ogilvie (C&NW)	Randolph / Millennium (IC)	LaSalle Street (CRI&P)	Central (IC)	Dearborn (C&WI)	Grand Central (WC/C&NP)	Great Central (IC)	Other stations	Wells Street (C&NW)	Canal Street
BNSF Railway (Metra branded (Note: As Metra's BNSF Line))	–	1995–present										
Union Pacific Railroad (Metra branded (Note: As Metra's Union Pacific North Line, Union Pacific Northwest, and Union Pacific West lines.))	Metra		1995–2025									
Northern Indiana Commuter Transportation District	–			1990–present								
Metra (Note: "Commuter Rail Service Board" until 1985)	–	1984–present	2025–present	1987–present	1984–present							
Norfolk Southern Railway (Note: This commuter service is now Metra's SouthWest Service)	Metra	1982–1993										
Regional Transportation Authority (Note: Operated through subsidiary Northeast Illinois Railroad Corporation as defined in 1974 charter)	Metra	1982–1984			1981–1984							
**Conrail**	Amtrak	1976–1979										
Illinois Central Gulf Railroad	Metra	1972–1987		1972–1987								
Amtrak	–	1971–present				1971–1972						
**Burlington Northern Railroad** (Note: Their commuter rail operations are now Metra's BNSF Line)	BNSF	1970–1995										
**Louisville and Nashville Railroad**	–						1969–1971					
**Penn Central Transportation Company**	Amtrak, Conrail	1968–1976			1968	1968–1971						
Norfolk and Western Railway	NS	1976–1982			1964–1965		1964–1976					
Erie Lackawanna Railway	–						1960–1970					
**Monon Railroad**	–						1956–1971					
**Gulf, Mobile and Ohio Railroad**	Amtrak, ICG	1947–1972										
Alton Railroad	GM&O	1931–1947										
**Chicago, Milwaukee, St. Paul and Pacific Railroad**	Amtrak, RTA	1928–1982										
Chicago South Shore and South Bend Railroad	NICTD			1925–1990		1925–1972						
**Chesapeake and Ohio Railway**	–		1969–1971			1925–1933	1922–1925	1947–1969				
Pittsburgh, Cincinnati, Chicago and St. Louis Railroad	PRR	1917–1921										
New York Central Railroad	PC				1914–1968	1930–1968						
Chicago and Western Indiana Railroad	–						1910–1963					
Chesapeake and Ohio Railway of Indiana	C&O					1910	1910–1922					
Baltimore and Ohio Chicago Terminal Railroad	–							1910–c. 1915				
Minneapolis, St. Paul and Sault Ste. Marie Railroad	Metra (1996)					1909–1912, 1963–1965		1912–1963				
Chicago, Lake Shore and South Bend Railway	CSS&SB			1909–1925		1909–1925						
Chicago, Cincinnati & Louisville Railroad	C&O of Indiana					1907–1910						
Chicago, Indiana and Southern Railroad	NYC				1906–1914							
Pere Marquette Railway	C&O							1904–1947				
Indiana Harbor Railroad	CI&S				1904–1906							
**Grand Trunk Western Railroad**	–						1897–1971					
Chicago Terminal Transfer Railroad	B&OCT							1897–1910				
Chicago, Indianapolis and Louisville Railway	Monon						1897–1956					
Chicago Great Western Railway	–							1892–1893, 1894–1955		1893–1894		
Chicago, St. Paul and Kansas City Railroad	CGW							1892				
**Atchison, Topeka and Santa Fe Railway**	Amtrak						1890–1971					
Erie Railroad	EL						1890–1960					
Pittsburgh, Cincinnati, Chicago and St. Louis Railway	PCC&St.L Rail**road**	1890–1917										
Chicago and Northern Pacific Railroad	CTT							1890–1897				
Cleveland, Cincinnati, Chicago and St. Louis Railway	NYC					1893–1930			1889–1893			
Chicago and Great Western Railroad	C&NP							1889–1890				
Chicago, Santa Fe and California Railway	AT&SF						1888–1890					
Wabash Railroad	N&W						1887–1964					
Wisconsin Central Railway	MStP&SSM					1900–1909		1887–1900				
Louisville, New Albany, and Chicago Railway	CI&L						1885–1897					
**Baltimore and Ohio Railroad**	–		1969–1971					1892–1969		1883–1892		
Chicago, St. Louis and Pittsburgh Railroad	PCC&StL	1883–1890										
New York, Chicago and St. Louis Railroad	N&W				1883–1892, 1898–1964					1882–1883, 1892–1898		
Chicago and Grand Trunk Railway	GTW						1885–1897			1880–1885		
Chicago and Atlantic Railway	C&E						1885–1890			1880–1885		
Cincinnati, Indianapolis, St. Louis and Chicago Railway	CCC&StL								1880–1889			
Wabash, St. Louis and Pacific Railway	Wabash						1885–1887			1880–1885		
Chicago and Eastern Illinois Railroad	L&N				1904–1913		1885–1904, 1913–1969			1877–1885		
Chicago, Milwaukee and St. Paul Railway	CMStP&P	1874–1928										
Cincinnati, Lafayette and Chicago Railroad	CIStL&C								1872–1880			
Chicago and Pacific Railroad	WStL&P									1872–1879		
Milwaukee and St. Paul Railway	CM&StP	1872–1874										
Pennsylvania Company	PRR	1871–1918										
Pennsylvania Railroad	PCo / PC	1869–1871, 1921–1968										
Lake Shore and Michigan Southern Railway	NYC				1869–1914							
Pittsburgh, Cincinnati and St. Louis Railway	CStL&P	1882–1883								1869–1882		
Columbus, Chicago and Indiana Central Railway	PC&St.L									1868–1869		
Chicago, Rock Island and Pacific Railroad	C&NW				1866–1980							
Chicago and Great Eastern Railway	CC&IC									1866–1868		
Chicago and Rock Island Railroad	CRI&P				1866							
Chicago and Alton Railroad	Alton	1863–1931								1862–1863		
Chicago and North Western Railway	NIRC, UP		1911–1995		1980–1981					1871–187X	187X–1911	1859–1890
Pittsburgh, Fort Wayne and Chicago Railway	PRR	1861–1869								1858–1861		
St. Louis, Alton and Chicago Railroad	Chicago & Alton									1857–1862		
Joliet and Chicago Railroad / Chicago and Mississippi Railroad	St.LA&C									1856–1857		
Chicago, Burlington and Quincy Railroad	BN	1881–1970							1856–1881	1855–1856		
Michigan Southern and Northern Indiana Railroad	LS&MS				1866–1869					1855–1866		
Chicago, St. Paul and Fond du Lac Railroad	C&NW											1855–1859
Northern Indiana Railroad	MS&NI									1855		
Illinois and Wisconsin Railroad	CSt.P&FdL											1854–1855
Chicago and Milwaukee Railway	C&NW											1853–1869
**Illinois Central Railroad**	Amtrak, ICG			1893–1972		1893–1971			1856–1893	1852–1856		
Michigan Central Railroad	NYC					1893–1930			1856–1893	1852–1856		
Chicago and Aurora Railroad	CB&Q									1852–1855		
Northern Indiana and Chicago Railroad	Northern Indiana									1852–1855		
Aurora Branch Railroad	Chicago & Aurora									1850s–1852		1849–1850s
Galena and Chicago Union Railroad	C&NW								1856–1857		1852–1869	1848–1852

NOTE: From 1883 to 1892, the Baltimore and Ohio Railroad had a depot between Madison and Monroe Streets, trackage rights via the Illinois Central Railroad.

The New York, Chicago and St. Louis Railroad ("Nickel Plate Road") used the Illinois Central Railroad local station at 22nd Street in 1882, and the B&O depot in 1883.

Future tenants of Dearborn Station used the Chicago and Western Indiana Railroad depot at 12th and State between 1880 and 1885.

The Wabash, St. Louis and Pacific Railway used its own depot before gaining access to 12th and State depot in 1882.

The Chicago, Terre Haute and Southeastern Railway, later part of the Chicago, Milwaukee, St. Paul and Pacific Railroad ("Milwaukee Road"), never had passenger service in the Chicago area.

The Chicago North Shore and Milwaukee Railroad and the Chicago Aurora and Elgin Railroad used tracks of the Chicago "L", specifically the Loop Elevated and Wells Street Terminal.

The Chicago and Joliet Electric Railway had a terminal at Archer Avenue and Cicero Avenue.

In the aftermath of the Great Chicago Fire, a C&NW freight depot at State and Water Streets was used as a temporary passenger depot since Wells Street Station had burned.

"Canal Street" refers to two depots: the C&NW depot (former Chicago, St. Paul and Fond du Lac Railroad) and the original Galena and Chicago Union Railroad depot (later used by the Chicago and Milwaukee Railway). Both burned in 1871, only the C&NW depot was rebuilt.
