= Baltimore and Ohio and Chicago Railroad =

Subsidiary of Baltimore and Ohio Railroad

Map

The Baltimore and Ohio and Chicago Railroad (B&O&C) was a subsidiary of the Baltimore and Ohio Railroad (B&O) that owned the line from Willard, Ohio to Chicago, Illinois.

== History ==
In 1869 the B&O leased the Sandusky, Mansfield and Newark Railroad (SM&N), which stretched north from Newark on the Central Ohio Railroad to Sandusky on Lake Erie. Desiring to extend its system to Chicago, the B&O incorporated the Baltimore, Pittsburgh and Chicago Railway as separate companies in Ohio and Indiana on March 13 and March 14, 1872, respectively; a third company with the same name was incorporated in Illinois on February 27, 1873. Surveying began immediately, and a line was soon located and constructed from a point on the SM&N named Chicago Junction (later renamed Willard after B&O president Daniel Willard) to Chicago. Operations began on November 23, 1874, under lease to the B&O, which initially obtained trackage rights over the Illinois Central Railroad (IC) north of the new line's terminus in Brookdale, Chicago (now located at the start of the Metra Electric District's South Chicago branch). On December 27, 1876, the Ohio and Indiana companies were consolidated to form the Baltimore and Ohio and Chicago Railroad, and simultaneously the Illinois company was renamed to match.

On August 1, 1891, the Akron and Chicago Junction Railroad was opened, under lease to the B&O&C, which subleased it to the B&O. This extended the line east from Chicago Junction to Akron, where it met newly acquired B&O subsidiary Pittsburgh and Western Railway, forming a through line between Chicago and Pittsburgh and thence to Baltimore via the Pittsburgh and Connellsville Railroad and B&O proper. The Baltimore and Ohio Connecting Railroad was completed on October 8, 1892, improving the B&O's Chicago terminal arrangements in conjunction with trackage rights over the Chicago, Rock Island and Pacific Railway from South Chicago to Brainerd, where the B&O Connecting began, and the Chicago and Northern Pacific Railroad from the B&O Connecting's other end into downtown Chicago. The B&O&C was subsequently disconnected from the IC, though a connection remained at the crossing of the IC's South Chicago Railroad. The B&O&C of Illinois was absorbed by the B&O&C of Ohio and Indiana at some time, and in 1949 the B&O acquired the properties of the B&O&C.

The line between Brookdale and a point southeast of the Calumet River in South Chicago has since been abandoned, and operation near the Indiana Harbor and Ship Canal is via trackage rights over the Norfolk Southern Railway's Chicago Line, but the line east of Pine Junction in Gary remains a main line of B&O successor CSX Transportation, which calls the old B&O&C the Willard Subdivision (Willard-Deshler), Garrett Subdivision (Deshler-Willow Creek), Barr Subdivision (Willow Creek-Pine Junction), and Lake Subdivision (Pine Junction-South Chicago).

== See also ==
- List of defunct Illinois railroads
- List of defunct Indiana railroads
- List of defunct Ohio railroads
