= Barr Subdivision =

Railway line in Indiana and Illinois

CSX Barr Subdivision

Overview
- Status: Operational
- Owner: Baltimore and Ohio Railroad (formerly); CSX Transportation
- Locale: Illinois, Indiana
- Termini: MP DC 15.8 Vermont St.; MP BI 236.5 Willow Creek

Service
- Type: Freight line
- System: CSX Transportation
- Route number: M5
- Operator(s): CSX Transportation

History
- Opened: 1874

Technical
- Track length: 38.3 mi (61.6 km)
- Number of tracks: 2 - 3
- Track gauge: 1,435 mm (4 ft 8 1/2 in) standard gauge
- Operating speed: 20–60 mph (32–97 km/h)

The Barr Subdivision is a railroad line owned and operated by CSX Transportation in the U.S. states of Indiana and Illinois. The line runs from Willow Creek (a neighborhood in Portage, Indiana), west to just west of Blue Island, Illinois, along a former Baltimore and Ohio Railroad (B&O) line. At its east end, it junctions with the Porter Subdivision and Garrett Subdivision; its west end is at the south end of the Blue Island Subdivision, with access to the New Rock Subdivision via trackage rights over the Metra Rock Island District and access to the Indiana Harbor Belt Railroad. Junctions exist with the Lake Subdivision at Pine Junction in Gary, Indiana and with the Chicago Heights Subdivision at Harvey Junction (near Blue Island).

== History ==
The line east of Pine Junction was opened by the Baltimore, Pittsburgh and Chicago Railway in 1874.
