= Fort Wayne Line =

Railway line in Pennsylvania, Ohio, and Indiana

Overview
- Other name: Fort Wayne Secondary; PRR Chicago Main Line
- Status: Operational
- Owner: Current: NS (1993-present); CSX (1999-present); CFE (2004-present); Formerly: List of former owners Ohio and Pennsylvania Railroad (1851-1856); Pittsburgh, Fort Wayne and Chicago Railway (1856-1869 (Note: As independent railroad. Subsidiary of the PRR 1869-1968, Penn Central 1968-1976)); PRR (1869-1968 (Note: leased to Pennsy Co. 1871-1918)); Penn Central (1968-1976); Conrail (1976-1999)
- Termini: Pittsburgh, Pennsylvania, U.S.; Chicago Illinois

History
- Opened: 1851

Technical
- Track gauge: 1,435 mm (4 ft 8 1/2 in) standard gauge

The Fort Wayne Line and Fort Wayne Secondary is a rail line owned and operated by the Norfolk Southern Railway (NS), Chicago, Fort Wayne and Eastern Railroad (CFE), and CSX Transportation in Pennsylvania, Ohio, and Indiana. The line runs from Pittsburgh, west via Fort Wayne, Indiana, to Gary, Indiana, along what was once the Pennsylvania Railroad's Pittsburgh to Chicago main line.

From downtown Pittsburgh, at the west end of the Pittsburgh Line, west to the junction with CSX's Greenwich Subdivision at Crestline, Ohio, NS owns the line. Major junctions include the Conemaugh Line in northern Pittsburgh, the Cleveland Line at Rochester, Pennsylvania, the Youngstown Line at New Brighton, Pennsylvania, the Lordstown Secondary east of Alliance, Ohio, and the Cleveland Line again at Alliance.

From Crestline west to Adams junction in Allen County, Indiana, (Fort Wayne Line) and beyond to the Gary, Indiana, neighborhood of Tolleston (Fort Wayne Secondary), the line is owned by CSX. Since 2004 this section has been leased to and operated by RailAmerica's Chicago, Fort Wayne and Eastern Railroad (CFE), with NS retaining trackage rights.

The final piece, from CSX's Porter Subdivision at Tolleston northwest to NS's Chicago Line, the former LS&MS in far northwestern Gary, Indiana, at Buffington, is owned by CSX with NS trackage rights, junctioning CSX's Barr Subdivision at Clarke Junction (also in northwestern Gary).

Amtrak's Capitol Limited operates over the line east of Alliance (OH).

The Fort Wayne Line is also home to the second biggest rail yard in America, Conway Yard, Conway and Freedom, Pennsylvania.

== History ==
The Ohio and Pennsylvania Railroad opened the line from Allegheny (Pittsburgh) west to Crestline in 1851, 1852, and 1853; the Fort Wayne Railroad Bridge connected it to the Pennsylvania Railroad's Main Line in downtown Pittsburgh in 1857. From Crestline west to Fort Wayne, the Ohio and Indiana Railroad opened the line in 1853 and 1854. The Fort Wayne and Chicago Railroad extended the line west to Columbia City in 1856, on July 26 the three companies merged to form the Pittsburgh, Fort Wayne and Chicago Rail Road. The line was completed to Chicago in 1856 and 1858.

The Pennsylvania Railroad began operating the line under lease on July 1, 1869. The line was subleased to the Pennsylvania Company on April 1, 1871, which operated it until January 1, 1918, when the lease was reassigned to the PRR. It passed to Penn Central Transportation in 1968 and Conrail in 1976.

The line from Fort Wayne east to Alliance was not as favored in the Conrail system as the duplicate New York Central Railroad lines, and, during rationalization efforts that took place in the early 1980s, this section of the Fort Wayne line changed in importance. Traffic heading from Pittsburgh to Chicago was routed onto the Cleveland Line at Alliance, while traffic towards Columbus, Cincinnati, Indianapolis and St. Louis was routed onto the former New York Central Big Four line at Crestline. The remainder of the line west of Crestline was reduced to a single track with passing sidings. The route's automatic block signals were downgraded to an absolute permissive block system with home signals at passing sidings and diamonds. This route was used by Amtrak's Capitol Limited until the early 1990s, when the train was rerouted via the CSX Chicago line and then eventually rerouted again onto the eastern half of the Fort Wayne line to Alliance. After the end of Amtrak service on the western end of the Fort Wayne line, all intermediate signals west of Crestline except North Robinson were taken out of service, and the route transitioned into being run by track warrant control. Conrail built a RoadRailer facility just west of Crestline, taking advantage of the light traffic on the Fort Wayne line, and Crestline's proximity to U.S. Routes 23 and 30. This facility was closed during the Conrail split.

After the breakup of Conrail in 1999, CSX acquired Conrail's portion of the line from Crestline to Fort Wayne and NS's portion of the line west of Fort Wayne, giving CSX a second route to Chicago. NS kept trackage rights and acquired the line east of Crestline. The decision to give CSX the Fort Wayne line west of Crestline required the construction of a new interchange track in the northwest corner of the crossing with the Big Four line that CSX acquired. As part of the trackage rights agreement, Norfolk Southern is allowed to run up to 8 trains per day between Crestline and Bucyrus, where they have connections to their former N&W mainline from Sandusky to Portsmouth, and up to 6 trains a day into Fort Wayne. Norfolk Southern utilized their trackage rights heavily during the first year or so after the Conrail split; however, as infrastructure improved on the former New York Central and former Nickel Plate Road Chicago lines, the need for trackage rights decreased. In 2014, Norfolk Southern began running low-priority extra segments of regularly scheduled trains via the western end of the Fort Wayne line to alleviate congestion on the very busy former New York Central Chicago line.

On February 3, 2023, a train carrying dangerous materials derailed near East Palestine, Ohio. On the evening of February 8, Norfolk Southern resumed freight traffic on the impacted section.

In the potential future, an Amtrak route running from Chicago to Fort Wayne up to 4 round trips daily has grown exponentially in support in recent years.

== See also ==
- List of CSX Transportation lines
- List of Norfolk Southern Railway lines
