= Cleveland Line =

Cleveland Line may refer to:

- Cleveland line, a suburban railway line from Brisbane to Cleveland in Queensland, Australia
- Cleveland Line (Norfolk Southern), running from Rochester, Pennsylvania, to Cleveland, Ohio, along a former Pennsylvania Railroad line
