= Balmoral Park (Illinois) =

Equestrian facility in Crete, Illinois

- Interactive map of Balmoral Park
- Former names: Lincoln Fields Race Track
- Location: Will County, Illinois, US
- Coordinates: 41°24′43.2″N 87°37′30.95″W
- Owner: HITS, Inc. (Saugerties, New York)
- Capacity: 71,000
- Events: Horse racing, horse shows
- Field shape: Oval

Construction
- Opened: August 9, 1926
- Closed: December 26, 2015
- Years active: 1926—2015; 2017—2020

Website
- Official website (2017 archive)

Balmoral Park is an equestrian facility located just south of Crete, Illinois, United States. It operated from 1926 to 2015 as a horse racing track. It reopened in 2017 as a horse show facility under the same name, though this operation folded after only a few years.

== History ==
=== Early years ===
Colonel Matt Winn, manager of Churchill Downs, came to Chicago in 1925 to look over the Illinois racing situation. Winn returned to Kentucky, where he talked to business associates at the Kentucky Jockey Club. They agreed to buy 1,050 acres (4.2 km^{2}) just south of Crete to build the new track, which would be named "Lincoln Fields." The large oval was surrounded by Kentucky bluegrass which Winn imported from that state. Red Spanish tile was used as roofs on the buildings. Spring-fed lakes were built in the infield.

The inaugural meeting at Lincoln Fields began on August 9, 1926. The first trainer to stable on the grounds was thoroughbred horseman Daniel E. Stewart, the trainer for Senator Johnson Camden, president of the Kentucky Jockey Club. The first horse to work out was Camden's mare Rothermel. Miss Rosedale won the first race contested. The inaugural card featured the $5,000 Joliet Stakes for 2 year-old colts and geldings. The certificate system of wagering was used since pari-mutuel wagering was not made legal in Illinois until July 1, 1927.

On August 30, 1936, Lincoln Fields installed the DeBrie Camera at the finish line. This instrument recorded 240 pictures per second, and was the first such camera to be installed at an Illinois racetrack. The mighty Whirlaway won his first career race at Lincoln Fields on June 3, 1940, and later went on to win the coveted Triple Crown the following year.

=== Final years at Lincoln Fields ===
Lincoln Fields was shut down in 1942 due to World War II restrictions. All scheduled race meetings were moved to Hawthorne Race Course in Cicero, Illinois from 1943 to 1947. From 1948 to 1951, the Lincoln Fields race meetings were run at Washington Park in nearby Homewood.

During renovations for the 1952 season, a fire in the grandstands damaged Lincoln Fields and prevented its re-opening. The 1952–53 race meetings were once again shifted to Hawthorne Race Course. But in 1954, thoroughbred racing returned to the Crete homegrounds and Lincoln Fields celebrated its first running since 1942.

=== Transition to Balmoral Park ===
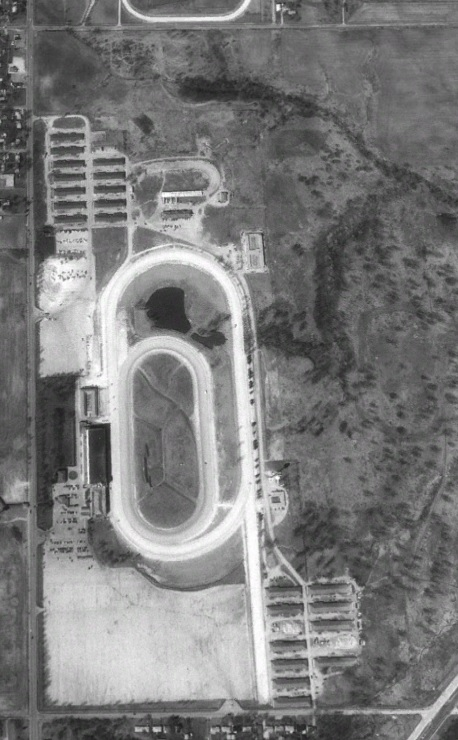
Aerial view of the facility in 1994 showing the original 5/8 mile oval as well as the one mile oval

In 1955, Benjamin Lindheimer put together the Balmoral Jockey Club which purchased Lincoln Fields. The name of the racetrack was soon changed to Balmoral Park. Lindheimer had been head of horse racing at Washington Park since 1935 and Arlington Park in Arlington Heights, Illinois since 1940. Balmoral's thoroughbred meetings were run at Washington Park from 1955 to 1963.

On June 5, 1960, Lindheimer died and was quickly succeeded by his adopted daughter, Marjorie Lindheimer Everett. Everett then consolidated Washington and Arlington Parks as divisions of a new corporation called Chicago Thoroughbred Enterprises (CTE), which also owned Balmoral Park. In 1964, Balmoral's thoroughbred race meetings were moved to Arlington Park, where it remained for six years.

William S. Miller, a self-made millionaire and horse breeder, and his partners purchased Balmoral Park in 1967. Miller had been a member of the Illinois Racing Board from 1951 to 1967 and also served as Board Chairman. Miller converted Balmoral's thoroughbred track to a half-mile track for harness racing. At that time, the Cook County harness racing season was limited to March through November. However, since Balmoral Park was located in neighboring Will County, the limitation did not apply and Balmoral was permitted to hold harness racing during the winter months.

=== Struggles and changing ownership ===
The Balmoral thoroughbred meeting for 1970 was moved to Washington Park, a disappointing move for Balmoral Park. It then returned to Arlington in 1971 for one season. The following year, the Balmoral thoroughbred meeting was moved again to Sportsman's Park in Chicago, where it remained for six years.

Edward J. DeBartolo Corporation purchased Balmoral Park in 1973. DeBartolo, a real estate developer, converted Balmoral's half-mile oval into a 5/8's mile race track to accommodate both thoroughbred and harness racing. This conversion allowed thoroughbred racing to return to Balmoral Park on January 8, 1978, the first time in 24 years. Balmoral Park ran summer thoroughbred meetings at Balmoral Park every year from 1978 to 1985. Balmoral Park also held a fall thoroughbred meeting from October through December 1986 to accommodate the Arlington Park fire.

Early in 1987, Balmoral Park was sold to the family of George Steinbrenner, owner of the New York Yankees, and a group of local track operators headed by Billy Johnston and his sons John and Duke. That same year, Illinois became the first state to permit race tracks to own and operate off-track betting facilities. Balmoral Park opened Illinois' first OTB parlor, located in Peoria on September 8, 1987.

=== Race to the top ===
On June 26, 1988, Balmoral Park hosted North America's first World Driving Championship, which originally began in Germany in 1972. The contest is conducted every four years to coincide with the Summer Olympics. Drivers from 14 countries participated, with Oddvar Maeland of Norway and Jans Stampp of Germany emerging as victors.

In the same year, Balmoral Park conducted the Miller High Life Jockey Challenge, a three-race series that featured nine of the leading jockeys in North America. Bill Shoemaker, North America's winningest jockey, won the event, defeating Jean Cruguet, Pat Day, Sandy Hawley, Julie Krone, Laffit Pincay Jr., Randy Romero, Ray Sibille and Jacinto Vásquez.

Soon after, a new one-mile (1.6 km) racing strip was built around the existing 5/8's mile oval. But in 1991, the Illinois Racing Board took away the racetrack's thoroughbred dates, making Balmoral Park an exclusive harness racing facility.

By 1993, Balmoral Park became a national leader in the use of standardized saddle pads. These pads made it easier for bettors to identify their wagering selections. Over the next few years, Balmoral held several races in conjunction with the World Driving Championships hosting drivers from 16 countries. Local driving star Dave Magee won the competition in 1995.

The 5/8 mile track was eliminated that year, but a state-of-the-art lighting system was installed on the one-mile (1.6 km) oval. On June 1, full-card simulcast wagering was introduced. In 1996, improvements continued and construction of a new receiving barn and paddock adjacent to the grandstand was completed. Balmoral Park could now accommodate 120 horses, the number of horses run each night.

=== The End of an Era ===
On January 25, 2014, harness racing ambassador and longtime supporter of Balmoral Park, Tony Maurello, died at age 93. The Tony Maurello Winner's Circle was dedicated in his honor on September 13 of the same year, during the 2014 Super Night festivities.

In 2015, the shocking news was made public that the racetrack was slated for closure at the end of the year. The closure was the result of a financial burden from a United States Court of Appeals ruling that Illinois racetracks had to pay casinos restitution.

=== A new beginning ===
In May 2017, Balmoral Park reopened to much local fanfare and held its first horse show under the ownership of HITS Inc., featuring show jumping and show hunting competitions. The facility joins other HITS horse show facility holdings in Culpeper, Virginia, Saugerties, New York, and Ocala, Florida.

Per October 12, 2020, The Chicago Tribune wrote that the Balmoral Park Horse Show Facility was again up for sale. Price 4 million dollars. As of March 17, 2022 various websites list the facility as "Permanently Closed".

== Physical attributes ==
The track has a one-mile (1.6 km) dirt oval. Its grandstands are capable of seating at least 71,000 spectators. There is stabling on the backstretch for over 900 horses. In its heyday, Balmoral's stalls were regularly at or near capacity.

== Racing ==
The following stakes were held at Balmoral Park:

- Orange and Blue
- Filly Orange and Blue
- Pete Langley Memorial
- Grandma Ann 2
- Dan Patch Championship
- Ann Vonian
- Su Mac Lad
- Lady Ann Reed
- American National series
- Lincoln Land
- Lady Lincoln Land

== Metra SouthEast service ==
Metra train service was first proposed in 2006 to provide commuter rail access to Chicago's southern and far southern suburbs, including Balmoral Park. The Alternatives Analysis for the SouthEast Service line was completed in 2010 and specified a southern terminus at a proposed station near the racetrack. The SouthEast Service would carry commuters between Balmoral Park and Chicago using the Union Pacific/CSX right-of-way adjacent to the racetrack as its south branch while its north branch would be shared with rail currently used by the Rock Island Line.

The SouthEast Service has a total of 13 proposed stations to serve Balmoral Park and the South and Far South Suburbs:

- LaSalle Street Station
- Bronzeville
- Gresham
- 115th Street/Kensington
- Dolton
- South Holland
- Thornton
- Glenwood
- Chicago Heights
- South Chicago Heights
- Steger
- Crete
- Balmoral Park

Services to Gresham, Bronzeville and LaSalle Street Station would be shared with the Rock Island Line to take advantage of existing infrastructure as well as provide easy access to Chicago's Downtown Loop and its CTA public transit system.

The SouthEast Service has lost much of its momentum in recent years and while the project faces a number of financial and political obstacles, the prospect of seeing a completed commuter rail service for Chicago's far south suburbs remains uncertain.
