= Pittsburgh, Fort Wayne and Chicago Railway =

American railroad

Overview
- Locale: Pittsburgh, PA to Chicago
- Dates of operation: 1851–1976

Technical
- Track gauge: 4 ft 8 1/2 in (1,435 mm) standard gauge

The Pittsburgh, Fort Wayne and Chicago Railway was a major part of the Pennsylvania Railroad system, extending the PRR west from Pittsburgh, Pennsylvania, via Fort Wayne, Indiana, to Chicago, Illinois. It included the current Norfolk Southern-owned Fort Wayne Line east of Crestline, Ohio, to Pittsburgh, and the Fort Wayne Secondary, owned by CSX, from Crestline west to Tolleston in Gary, Indiana. CSX leased its entire portion in 2004 to the Chicago, Fort Wayne and Eastern Railroad (CFE). The remaining portion of the line from Tolleston into Chicago is now part of the Norfolk Southern's Chicago District, with a small portion of the original PFW&C trackage abandoned in favor of the parallel lines of former competitors which are now part of the modern NS system.

== History ==
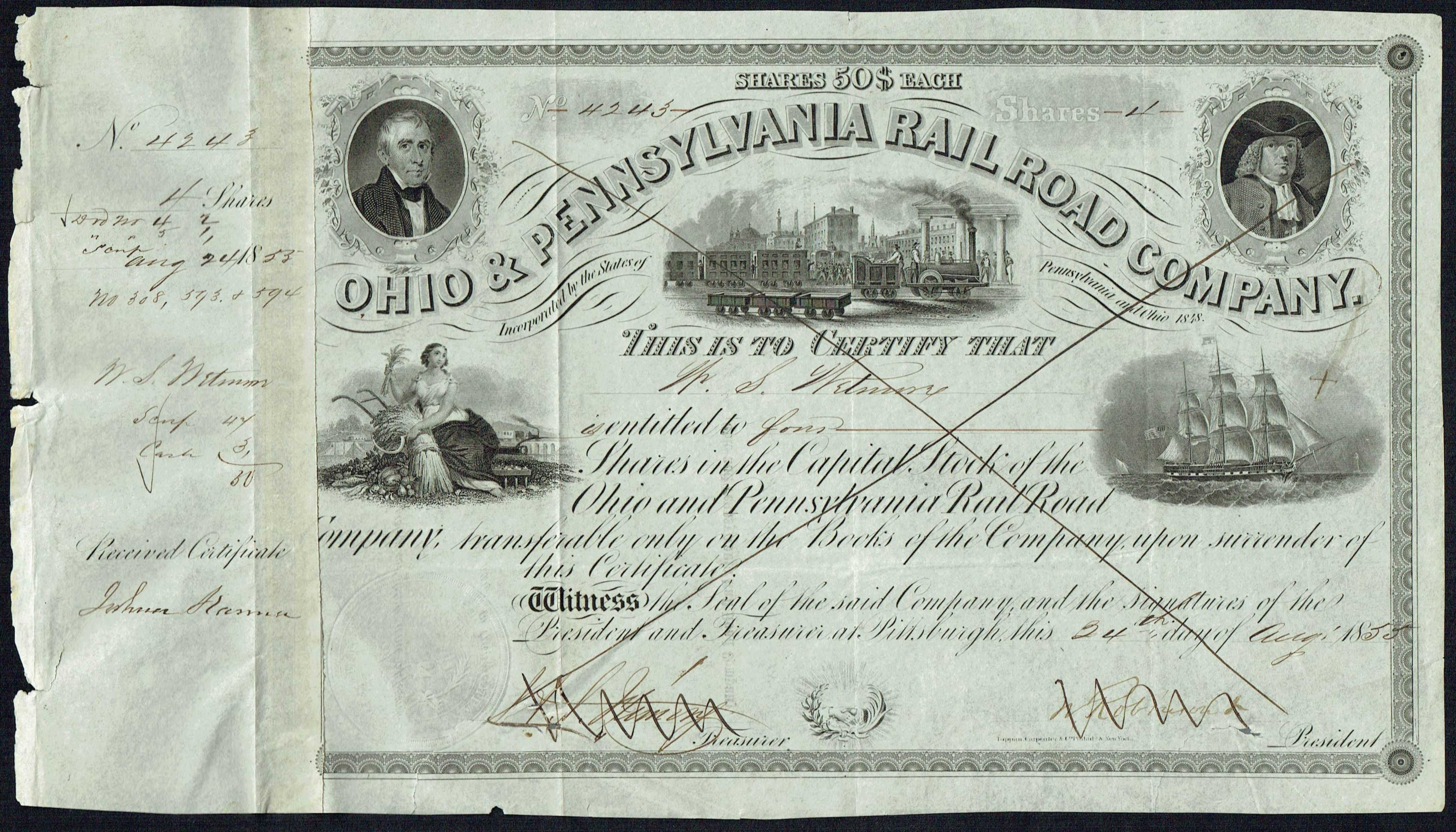
Share of the Ohio and Pennsylvania Railroad Company, issued 24. August 1855

The Ohio and Pennsylvania Railroad was chartered in Ohio on February 24 and in Pennsylvania on April 11, 1848, to build from Allegheny City (annexed by Pittsburgh in 1907) west to Crestline, Ohio, where it met the Cleveland, Columbus and Cincinnati Railroad. It was organized on June 15 with William Robinson Jr. as president, and construction began on July 4, 1849. The first section, from Allegheny City west to New Brighton, opened July 30, 1851. Extensions opened to New Galilee on October 22 and Enon Valley November 19. On November 27, 1851, a section between Salem and Alliance, Ohio, was completed, not yet connected to the rest. On December 8, the east section was extended west to East Palestine, Ohio, with a stagecoach transfer provided for through travel. Further sections opened January 3, 1852, west to Columbiana, and on January 6 the gap between Columbiana and Salem was filled. In conjunction with the Cleveland and Pittsburgh Railroad, connecting at Alliance, a through line was provided between Cleveland and Pittsburgh. On March 11, 1852, an extension west to Massillon was opened with an excursion. On August 10, 1852, a further extension from Massillon west to Wooster opened. The line west to Mansfield was finished April 8, 1853, and the full line to Crestline opened April 11. With this it formed part of a through line to Cincinnati via the Cleveland, Columbus and Cincinnati Railroad.

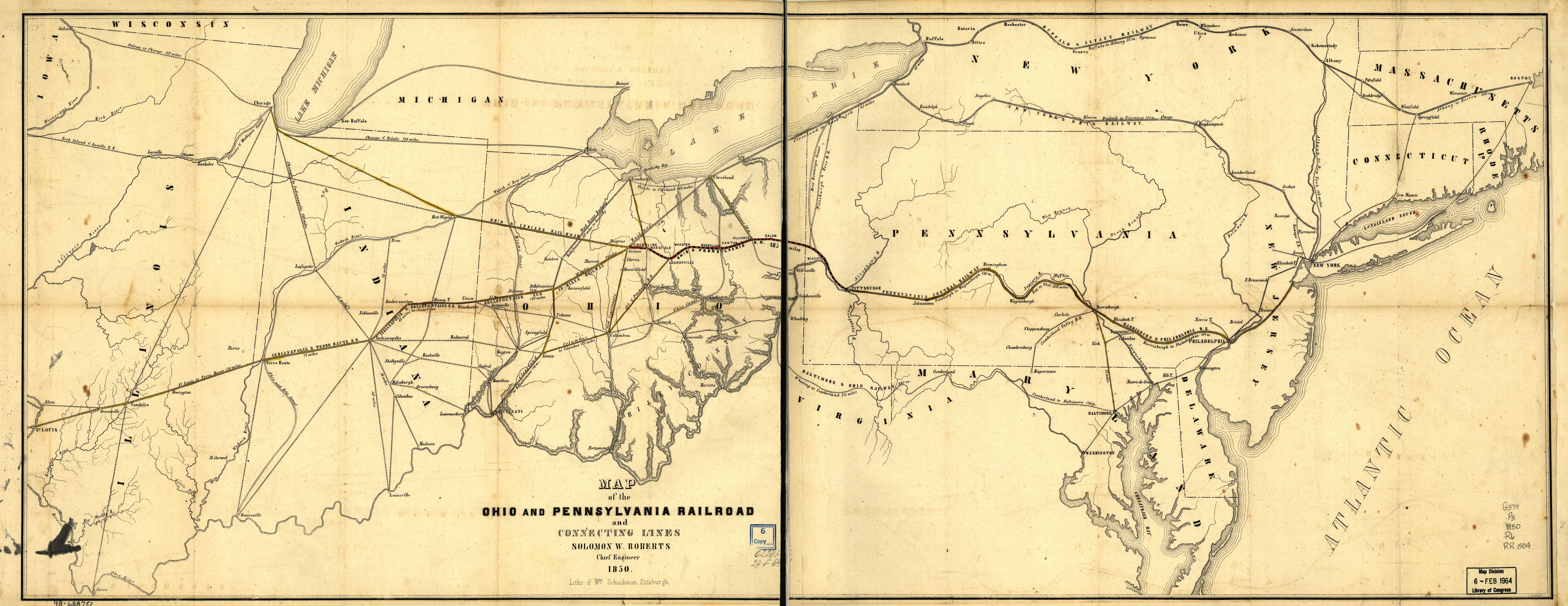
1850 map of the Ohio and Pennsylvania Railroad

Work began on August 16, 1854, on the Fort Wayne Railroad Bridge over the Allegheny River to extend the O&P into Pittsburgh to connect with the Pennsylvania Railroad. The bridge opened September 22, 1857, with a temporary station at Penn and Wayne Streets (today Penn Avenue and Tenth Street).

The Ohio and Indiana Railroad was chartered in Ohio on March 26, 1850, and in Indiana on January 15, 1851, to extend the line west to Fort Wayne, Indiana. It was organized July 4, 1850, and work began in February 1852. Some of the capital was gained from a merger with the Great Western Railroad of Ohio in 1851. On August 26, 1853, the line opened from Crestline west to Bucyrus, and a continuation west to Forest opened in early January 1854. On June 10 the line opened west to Delphos, and on October 31 the full line to Fort Wayne was completed, opening the next day.

The Fort Wayne and Chicago Railroad was chartered in Indiana on May 11, 1852, and organized September 14, 1852, as a further extension west to Chicago. It was chartered February 5, 1853, in Illinois. The first section opened in February 1856 from Fort Wayne to Columbia City.

On July 26, 1856, the Pittsburgh, Fort Wayne and Chicago Rail Road was formed as a consolidation of the Fort Wayne and Chicago, Ohio and Indiana, and Ohio and Pennsylvania Railroads. Extensions opened west to Warsaw September 28, Plymouth November 10, Englewood, Illinois (south of Chicago) on November 29, 1858, and Van Buren Street in Chicago on December 25, 1858. On January 1, 1859, trains started running to Chicago, with a terminal at the future location of Union Station. The part west of Plymouth was built with rails removed from the New Portage Railroad.

From the early days, the Pennsylvania Railroad (PRR) had been involved with the project, supplying funds. Once the Fort Wayne Railroad Bridge at Pittsburgh was finished in 1857, trains began to run through from Philadelphia. In 1858 the PFW&C began using the first Union Station in Pittsburgh, shared with the PRR.

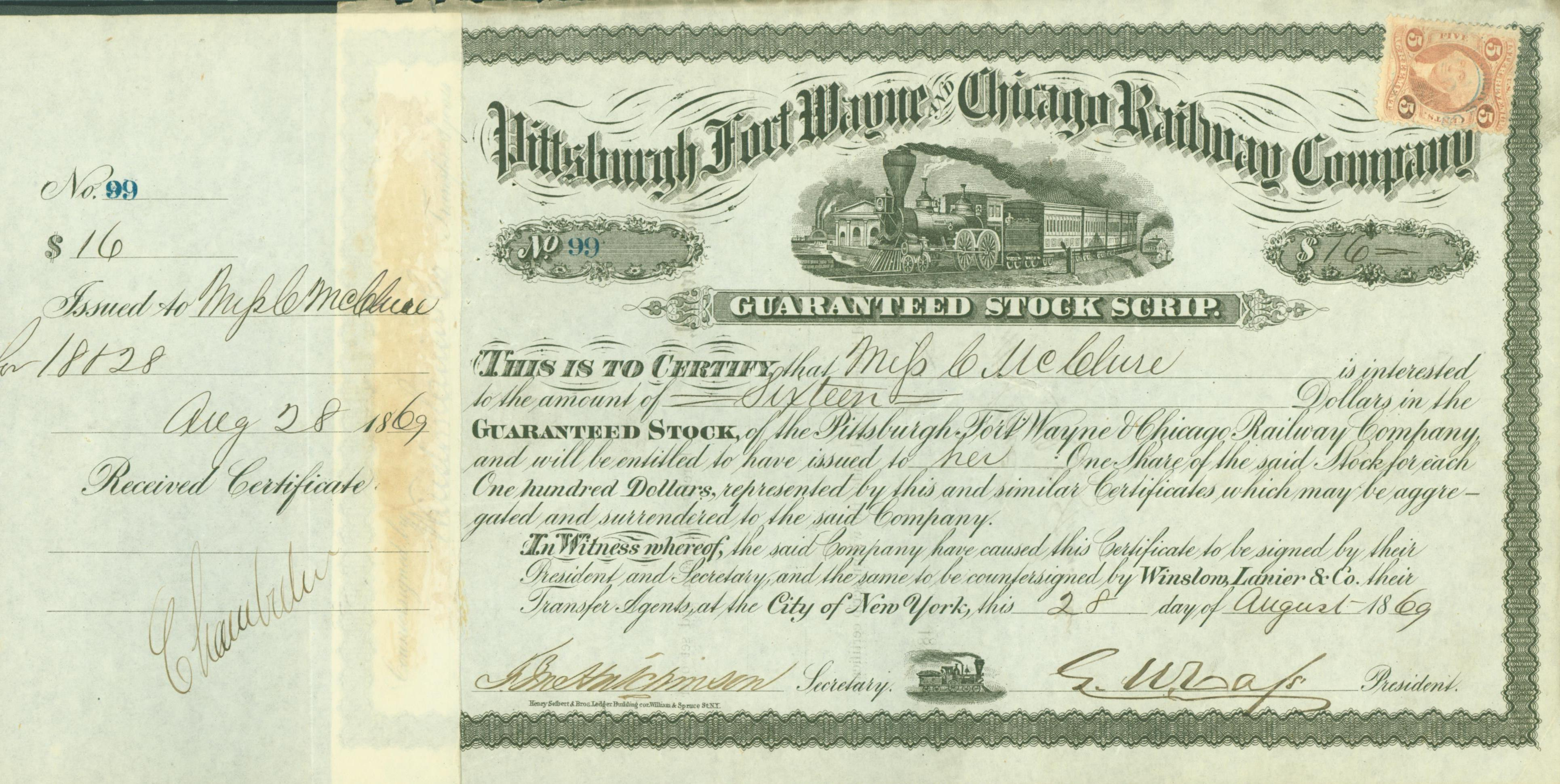
Guaranteed Stock Script of the Pittsburgh, Fort Wayne and Chicago Railway Company, issued 28 August 1869

On July 1, 1859, the PFW&C defaulted on its debts, and was sold at foreclosure on October 24, 1861. It was reorganized as the Pittsburgh, Fort Wayne and Chicago Railway February 26, 1862.

On July 1, 1865, the PFW&C leased the New Castle and Beaver Valley Railroad, giving it a branch from Homewood, Pennsylvania north to New Castle. The Lawrence Railroad, branching west from Lawrence Junction on the NC&BV to Youngstown, Ohio, was leased on June 27, 1869. On June 1, 1887, the Lawrence Railroad became part of the Youngstown, Lawrence and Pittsburgh Railroad, which on August 1 merged into the PRR's Pittsburgh, Youngstown and Ashtabula Railroad, and on January 9, 1906, that merged with the New Castle and Beaver Valley to form the Pittsburgh, Youngstown and Ashtabula Railway, still leased to the PRR.

The PFW&C bought the Cleveland, Zanesville and Cincinnati Railroad by deed on July 1, 1865, making it its Akron Branch. The line ran from Hudson, Ohio, on the Cleveland and Pittsburgh Railroad south through Akron, crossing the PFW&C at Orrville and continuing to Millersburg. In 1868 a short 3.5 mile (5.5 km) extension to the south was built, and on November 4, 1869, the PFW&C sold the line to the Pittsburgh, Mt. Vernon, Columbus and London Railroad. That company later became part of the PRR's Cleveland, Akron and Cincinnati Railway.

On May 22, 1869, the PFW&C leased the Massillon and Cleveland Railroad, giving it a short branch from Massillon north to the Akron Branch at Clinton.

On July 1, 1869, the PRR leased the PFW&C and began operating it directly, but on April 1, 1871, the PFW&C was transferred to the newly formed Pennsylvania Company. On December 1, 1871, the Pennsylvania Company leased the Cleveland and Pittsburgh Railroad. Since January 25, 1860, the C&P had been operated jointly by itself and by the PFW&C, providing a branch of the PFW&C from Rochester, Pennsylvania, west and north, crossing the PFW&C at Alliance, Ohio, and continuing to Cleveland.

Operation was transferred back to the Pennsylvania Railroad from the Pennsylvania Company on January 1, 1918.

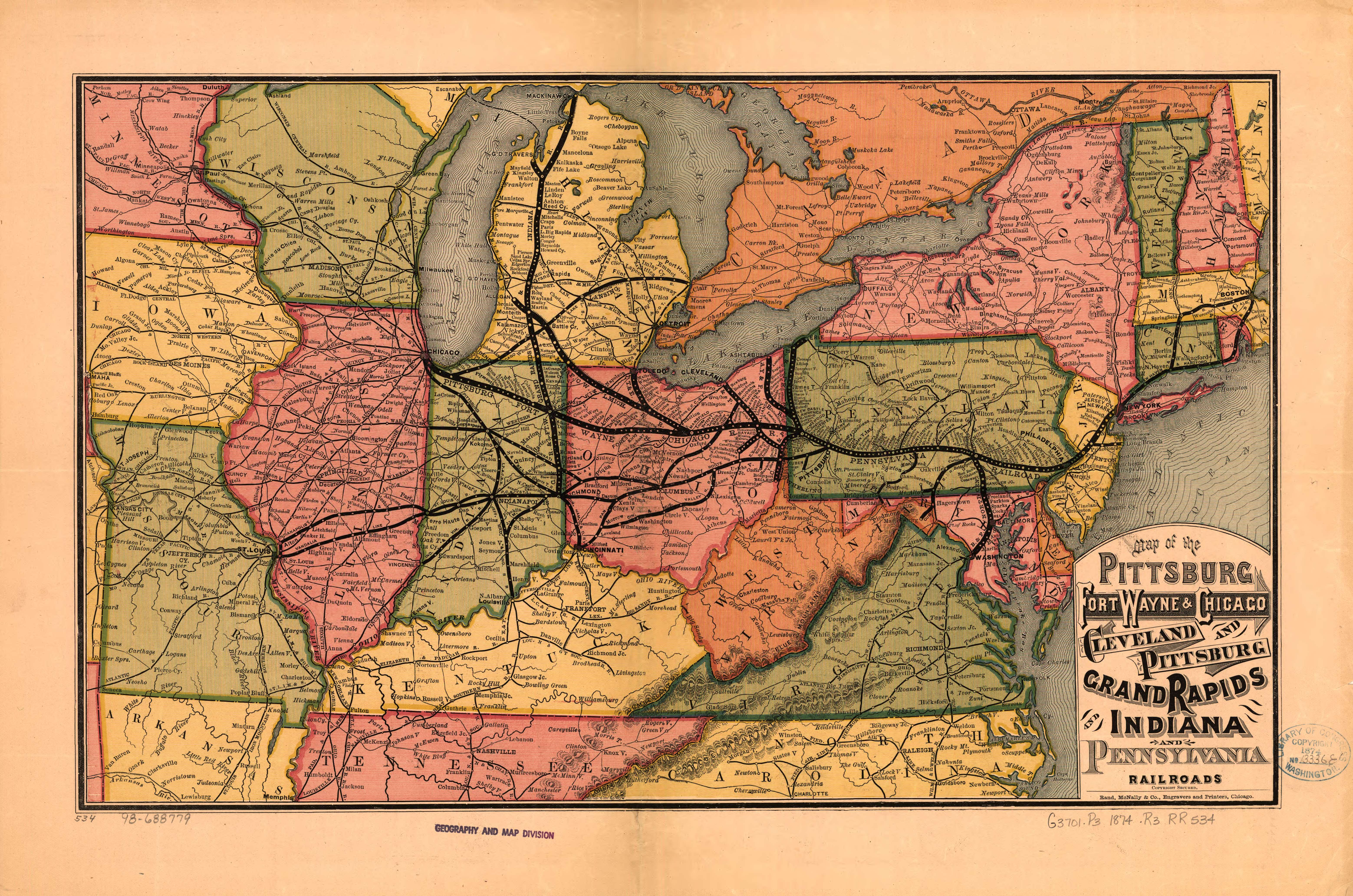
ca. 1874 Pennsylvania Railroad map, including the PFW&C

On February 1, 1968, the PRR was merged into Penn Central. The PFW&C stayed separate, filing for bankruptcy on July 14, 1973, over three years after Penn Central's 1970 bankruptcy. On April 1, 1976, the PFW&C became part of Conrail. Conrail downgraded the line, preferring other parallel lines. On June 2, 1994, the Norfolk Southern Railway bought 18 miles (29 km) from Gary to Valparaiso, which had been out of service since 1991, for $1.4 million. They soon bought 61 more miles (98 km), from Valparaiso east to Warsaw, and acquired trackage rights east to Fort Wayne.

With the August 22, 1998, breakup of Conrail, the line was split at Crestline, Ohio. West of Crestline, including the section that had been owned by Norfolk Southern since 1994, went to CSX Transportation, along with the intersecting Cleveland, Cincinnati, Chicago and St. Louis Railway (better known as the Big Four, a part of the New York Central Railroad system until 1968). Tracks east of Crestline went to Norfolk Southern, which also obtained trackage rights west of that Ohio city.

At the western end of the route, the original PFW&C line has been abandoned from Buffington (an area of far northwestern Gary, Indiana, abutting East Chicago) northwest for a little over four miles to Whiting, Indiana; at both of these locations there are connections to the parallel tracks of the old Lake Shore and Michigan Southern Railway (New York Central Railroad). Northwest of Whiting, the LS&MS itself disappears, and the present-day line goes back to using the old PFW&C tracks, which run the rest of the way into Chicago, carrying both Norfolk Southern freight trains and several Amtrak passenger services.

On August 1, 2004, the Chicago Fort Wayne and Eastern Railroad, a new short line owned by RailAmerica, leased the western part of the line, from Crestline, Ohio, west to the Gary, Indiana, neighborhood of Tolleston, from CSX. It also obtained overhead trackage rights along the formerly out-of-service line from Tolleston, at the junction with the old Michigan Central Railroad (now CSX), northwest to Clarke Junction (also in Gary, just north of the Gary-Chicago International Airport), and then west along the former Baltimore and Ohio Chicago Terminal Railroad (now CSX) to Blue Island, Illinois. Norfolk Southern continues to own the line east of Crestline, Ohio, as well as the part west of Whiting, IN.
