= Porter Subdivision =

Railway line in Indiana and Illinois

CSX Porter Subdivision

Overview
- Status: Operational
- Owner: Michigan Central Railroad (formerly); CSX Transportation
- Locale: Indiana
- Termini: QFP 259.3 Ivanhoe; QFP 240.9 Porter

Service
- Type: Freight line
- System: CSX Transportation
- Route number: PB
- Operator(s): CSX Transportation

History
- Opened: 1852

Technical
- Track length: 18.4 mi (29.6 km)
- Number of tracks: 1-2
- Track gauge: 1,435 mm (4 ft 8 1/2 in) standard gauge
- Operating speed: 40 mph (64 km/h)

The Porter Subdivision is a railroad line owned by CSX Transportation in the Chicago, Illinois, area. Formerly a part of the main line of the Michigan Central Railroad, it now connects CSX's former Baltimore and Ohio Railroad line and the Chicago Fort Wayne and Eastern Railroad from the east with the Indiana Harbor Belt Railroad towards Blue Island, Illinois.

== History ==
The Michigan Central Railroad built a line from Detroit, Michigan, to Chicago, Illinois, opening in mid-1852, several months after the competing Northern Indiana and Chicago Railroad (later the New York Central Railroad's main line) was completed. The MC's path entered Indiana near Michigan City, crossing the NI&C at Porter. From Porter it looped to the southwest and northwest, joining the Illinois Central Railroad in the Kensington neighborhood of Chicago. Later the Michigan Central (and the Northern Indiana and Chicago's successor, the Lake Shore and Michigan Southern Railway) came under control of the New York Central.

Eventually the NYC started to operate most trains west from Porter via the LS&MS, and the MC became a secondary route. All passenger trains moved on January 18, 1957, ending service to local stations in Gary and Hammond. In 1968 the NYC merged into Penn Central Transportation, and into Conrail in 1976. Around then the diamonds were removed at Porter, physically separating the line to Detroit from the line to Kensington, which came to be known as the Porter Branch. After 1980 Amtrak bought the line from Porter to Michigan City, Indiana, east of which they already owned to Kalamazoo, Michigan, about 2/5 the way to Detroit.

With the 1998 breakup of Conrail, CSX Transportation acquired the branch, by then only running from Porter west to Gibson, located in Hammond, Indiana, a junction with the east–west Indiana Harbor Belt Railroad and the north–south Kankakee Line, transferred from Conrail to the Norfolk Southern Railway. CSX has trackage rights on the IHB to and beyond Blue Island, with various connections to other CSX lines including the Baltimore and Ohio Chicago Terminal Railroad (Blue Island Subdivision). To the east, a connection existed at Tolleston to the Fort Wayne Secondary, also acquired in the 1998 Conrail breakup (though from the Norfolk Southern Railway). At Willow Creek, as part of the breakup, a new connection was built connecting CSX's ex-Baltimore and Ohio Railroad main line (the Garrett Subdivision) to the Porter Branch. In 2004 the little-used Fort Wayne Subdivision was leased to the Chicago Fort Wayne and Eastern Railroad.

At Porter, despite the existence of a CSX line to the northeast – the ex-Pere Marquette Railway Grand Rapids Subdivision – no connection exists across the Norfolk Southern Railway's ex-New York Central Railroad Chicago Line. CSX has considered putting in diamonds, but has held off for now (they use NS west of Porter to reach their Grand Rapids Subdivision). Thus besides one local, CSX does not currently use the Porter Branch east of the junction at Willow Creek. BNSF Railway and Union Pacific Railroad used it via trackage rights to reach Norfolk Southern's Elkhart Yard in Elkhart, Indiana, however as of 2025 they no longer do.
