= Willard Subdivision =

Railway line in Ohio

The Willard Subdivision is a railroad line owned and operated by CSX Transportation in the U.S. state of Ohio. The line runs from Willard west to Deshler along a former Baltimore and Ohio Railroad (B&O) line. At its east end, at Daniels Road west of Willard, the line becomes the Willard Terminal Subdivision. Its west end is at the east end of the Garrett Subdivision, just east of Deshler and the Toledo Subdivision. The line is split at Fostoria by the Fostoria Subdivision, which includes the junction with the Columbus Subdivision, and at Galatea the line intersects the Toledo Branch Subdivision. This was once Amtrak's Three rivers line.

== History ==
The line was opened by the Baltimore, Pittsburgh and Chicago Railway in 1874. It became part of the B&O and CSX through leases and mergers.
