= Akron and Chicago Junction Railroad =

Former American railroad in Ohio

Overview
- Locale: Ohio, United States
- Dates of operation: 1890–
- Successor: Baltimore and Ohio Railroad; CSX Transportation

Technical
- Track gauge: 4 ft 8 1/2 in (1,435 mm) standard gauge
- Length: 76.66 miles

The Akron & Chicago Junction Railroad was a railroad incorporated in the state of Ohio on February 17, 1890. It ran from Akron to the town of Chicago Junction, Ohio, renamed Willard in 1917. Construction was completed the following year, and the first train ran on August 15, 1891.

On July 1, 1890, the A&CJ was leased in perpetuity to the Baltimore and Ohio Railroad, who built the A&CJ as part of its new Pittsburgh-Chicago route, consisting of existing B&O trackage from Cumberland, Maryland, to Pittsburgh, with the newly acquired Pittsburgh and Western Railroad from New Castle, Pennsylvania, to Akron, and the A&CJ from Akron to the old B&O main line at Chicago Junction. The new line provided faster, more direct service from eastern shippers and markets through the heavily industrialized parts of Pennsylvania and Ohio to Chicago, avoiding the steep grades of B&O's mountainous route between Cumberland and Grafton, West Virginia.

The surviving portions of the B&O's Pittsburgh-Chicago route are part of CSX Transportation.
