= SouthEast Service =

Proposed commuter rail line in Chicago, Illinois, US

Overview
- Status: Proposed
- Locale: Chicago and southern suburbs
- Termini: LaSalle Street Station; Balmoral Park
- Stations: 13

Service
- Type: Commuter rail
- System: Metra

Technical
- Line length: 33 mi (53 km)
- Track gauge: 4 ft 8 1/2 in (1,435 mm)

The SouthEast Service is a proposed commuter rail line to be operated by Metra, the commuter railroad service for the Chicago metropolitan area. The route of the proposed line would use tracks owned by CSX Transportation and the Union Pacific Railroad.

== Past commuter service ==
Formerly, the Chicago and Western Indiana Railroad and the Chicago and Eastern Illinois Railroad operated commuter service on this line out of Dearborn Station to Dolton and Momence, respectively. The Chicago and Eastern Illinois commuter line to Momence ended in 1935, while the Chicago and Western Indiana service to Dolton was discontinued in 1964.

== Proposal ==
The building of a line from Chicago to the south suburbs ending at Balmoral Park has been discussed as early as 1986. In 2003, Metra officials proposed the SouthEast Service at the insistence of Congressman Jesse Jackson, Jr. that the south suburbs be included as part of Metra's larger request for federal dollars after they were largely excluded from the proposed STAR Line. Its northern terminus would be LaSalle Street Station in downtown Chicago. The line would then traverse Chicago's southern neighborhoods and its southern and far southern suburbs to Balmoral Park south of Crete, Illinois. Its average daily ridership was projected to be 9000. A fleet of Diesel Multiple Units (DMUs) has been proposed for this service.

In 2005, the SouthEast Service received initial funding authorization. In 2010, Al Riley became the chief sponsor of House Bill 1644 which created the Southeast Commuter Rail Transit District as a municipal corporation under Illinois state law. The district created has the right of eminent domain to acquire private property which is necessary for the purposes of the district and the power to contract for public mass transportation with Metra. The district includes Crete, Steger, South Chicago Heights, Chicago Heights, Glenwood, Thornton, South Holland, Dolton, Calumet City, Lansing, and Lynwood. The bill was signed into law by Governor Pat Quinn on March 8, 2011.

According to the Chicago Metropolitan Agency for Planning's ONTO 2050 regionally significant projects benefit report published in October 2018, the SouthEast Service is undergoing alternatives analysis and the identification of a Locally Preferred Alternative is in process. In 2019, the SouthEast Service was included in a Cost Benefit Analysis by Metra as a Tier 2 project. As of 2022, the project is on hold as more studies were needed to determine the cost of running the line.

The Center for Neighborhood Technology, an advocate for the new line, estimates that the SouthEast Service would more than double the number of average jobs accessible by transit in sixty minutes for the south suburbs on the line. In a 2016 letter to the editor, Martin J. Oberman, while the Chairman of Metra, supported the SouthEast Service.

=== Proposed stations ===
From north to south:

- LaSalle Street Station
- 35th Street
- Gresham
- 115th Street, which would be a transfer station for the Michigan station on the CTA Red Line Extension.
- Dolton
- South Holland. In 2012 South Holland spent $1.3 million to purchase land at 236 East 161st Place for the station.
- Thornton
- Glenwood. According to the 2010 Village of Glenwood Station Area Plan, potential station locations in Glenwood include a station located mid‐way between Main and Center Streets along Young Street.
- Chicago Heights. As of 2012, Chicago Heights has been assembling land for the creation of a station near its downtown.
- South Chicago Heights. According to their 2008 Comprehensive Plan, the station would be located near the intersection of Sauk Trail and Jackson Avenue.
- Steger
- Crete
- Balmoral Park
