= Garrett Subdivision =

CSX Mainline Subdivision in Northern Indiana and Northwest Ohio

CSX Garrett Subdivision
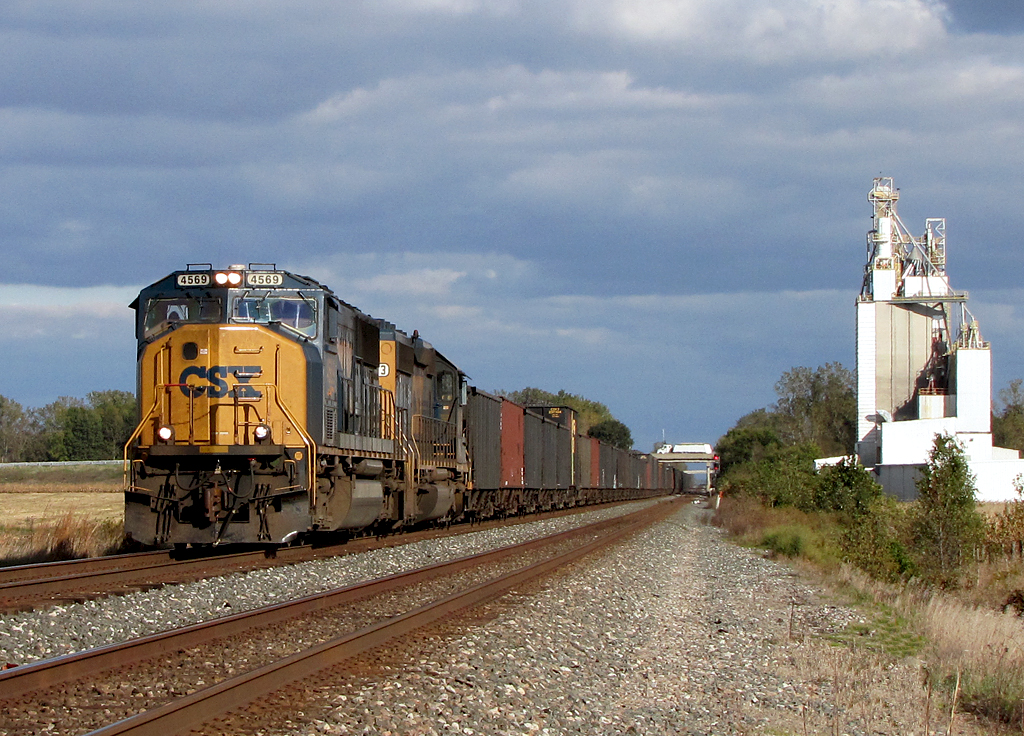
- CSX coke train on the Garret Subdivision, near Milford Junction, Indiana

Overview
- Status: Operational
- Owner: Baltimore and Ohio Railroad (formerly); CSX Transportation
- Locale: Indiana, Ohio
- Termini: MP BI 236.5 Willow Creek; MP BI 62.8 Deshler

Service
- Type: Freight line
- System: CSX Transportation
- Route number: CQ
- Operator(s): CSX Transportation

History
- Opened: 1874

Technical
- Track length: 173.7 mi (279.5 km)
- Number of tracks: 2 - 3
- Track gauge: 1,435 mm (4 ft 8 1/2 in) standard gauge
- Operating speed: 30–60 mph (48–97 km/h)

The Garrett Subdivision is a railroad line owned and operated by CSX Transportation in the U.S. states of Ohio and Indiana. The line runs from Deshler, Ohio, west to Willow Creek, Indiana (in Portage), along a former Baltimore and Ohio Railroad (B&O) line. At its east end, just east of Deshler, the Garrett Subdivision becomes the Willard Subdivision. The line crosses the Toledo Subdivision at Deshler and ends at the junction with the Porter Subdivision and Barr Subdivision at Willow Creek.

== History ==
The line was opened by the Baltimore and Ohio and Chicago Railroad in 1874. It became part of the B&O and CSX through leases and mergers.

Derailments occurred on the line in 2002, 2010, on January 6, 2012 (near Portage, Indiana) on April 22, 2014 (near Saint Joe, Indiana), and on July 21, 2021 (near Auburn, Indiana).
