= Fort Wayne Railroad Bridge =

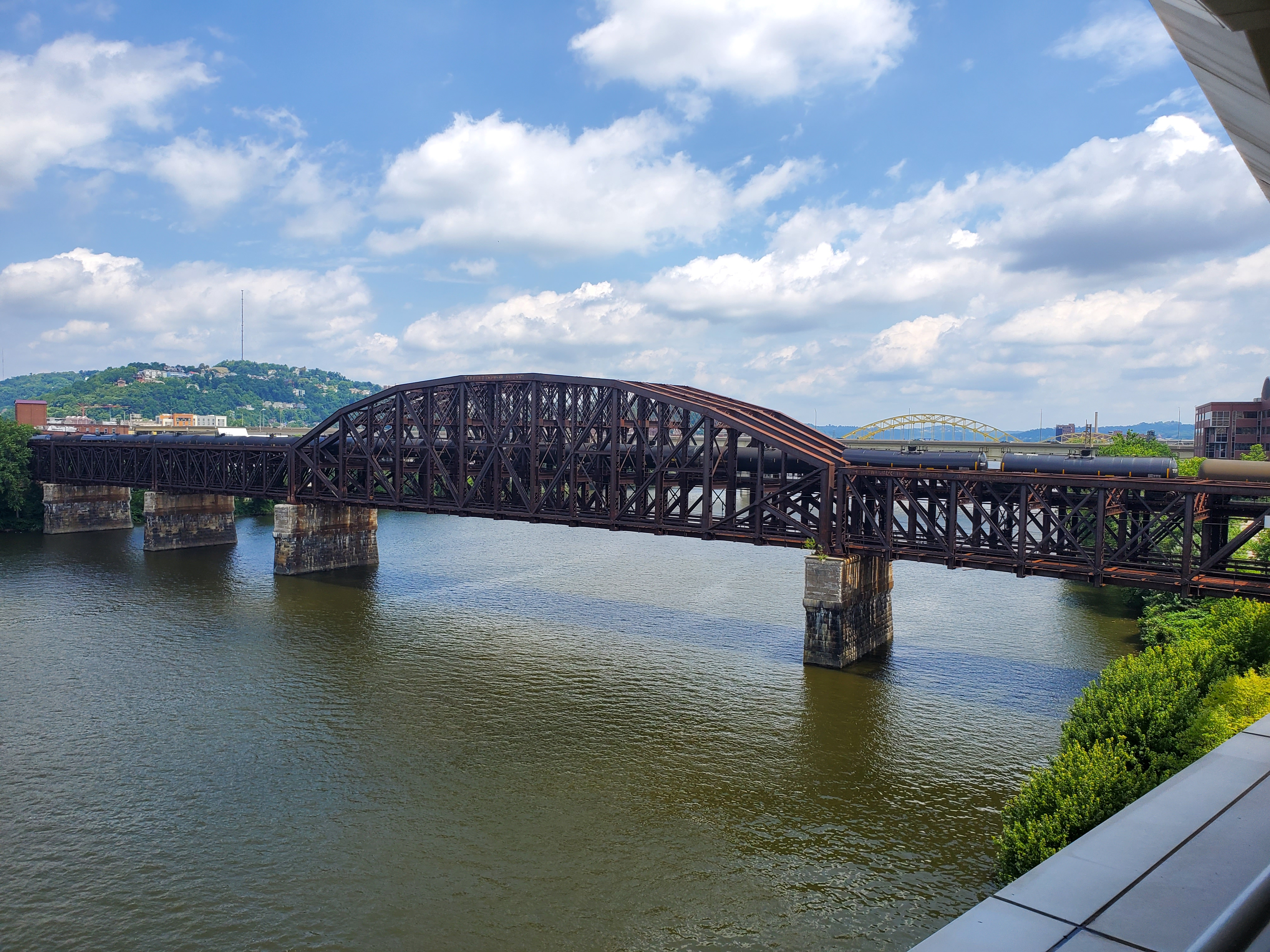
- The main span over the Allegheny River, as seen from the David L. Lawrence Convention Center, 2022
- Coordinates: 40.4480°N 79.9961°W
- Pennsylvania Railroad Bridge
- U.S. National Register of Historic Places
- Location within Pennsylvania
- Location: 11th St., Pittsburgh, Pennsylvania
- Area: 1.2 acres (0.49 ha)
- Built: 1901
- Built by: American Bridge Co.; Pennsylvania Railroad
- Architectural style: Double-decked through truss
- NRHP reference No.: 79002160
- Added to NRHP: August 13, 1979
- Carries: 2 tracks of NS / Amtrak Fort Wayne Line
- Official name: Bridge No. 1, Pittsburgh, Fort Wayne and Chicago Railway

Characteristics
- Total length: 985 ft (300 m) over five spans
- Longest span: 319 ft (97 m)
- Clearance below: deck is 40.9 ft (12.5 m) above Emsworth Dam normal pool level (710 ft (220 m) above sea level)

Rail characteristics
- Track gauge: 4 ft 8 1/2 in (1,435 mm) standard gauge

History
- Built: 1901–1904

Location
- Interactive map of Fort Wayne Railroad Bridge

The Fort Wayne Railroad Bridge, listed as the Pennsylvania Railroad Bridge on the National Register of Historic Places, is a double-deck steel truss railroad bridge spanning the Allegheny River in Pittsburgh, Pennsylvania.

The upper deck carries the Fort Wayne Line with two tracks of Norfolk Southern and Amtrak traffic. The lower deck is unused. The bridge crosses 40 feet (12 m) above the Allegheny and its longest span is 319 feet (97 m).

== History ==
The bridge was built between 1901 and 1904 by American Bridge Company on new piers immediately next to the 1868 bridge it replaced while the old bridge remained in use.

The 1868 bridge was a five-span wrought-iron lattice truss built for the Pittsburgh, Fort Wayne and Chicago Railway with two simple plate girder spans as approach roads at each end.

In 1918 the bridge and associated approaches were raised (as were other neighboring bridges) to increase navigable headroom.

The lower level was used by local freight trains switching in the Downtown area and the Strip District. Its tracks were removed in the 1980s as part of a major track and platform realignment through Pennsylvania Station.

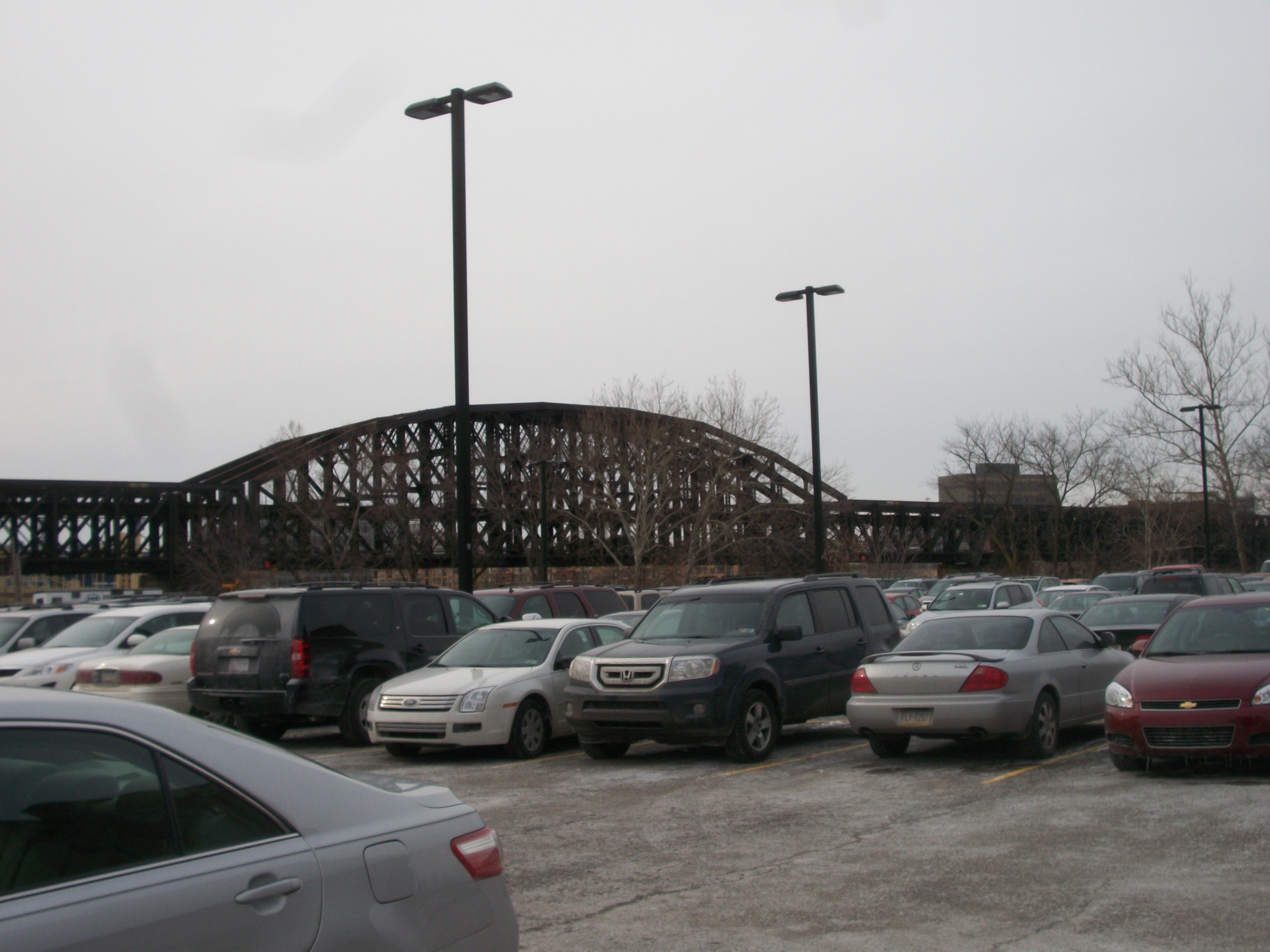
Center span, from a parking lot

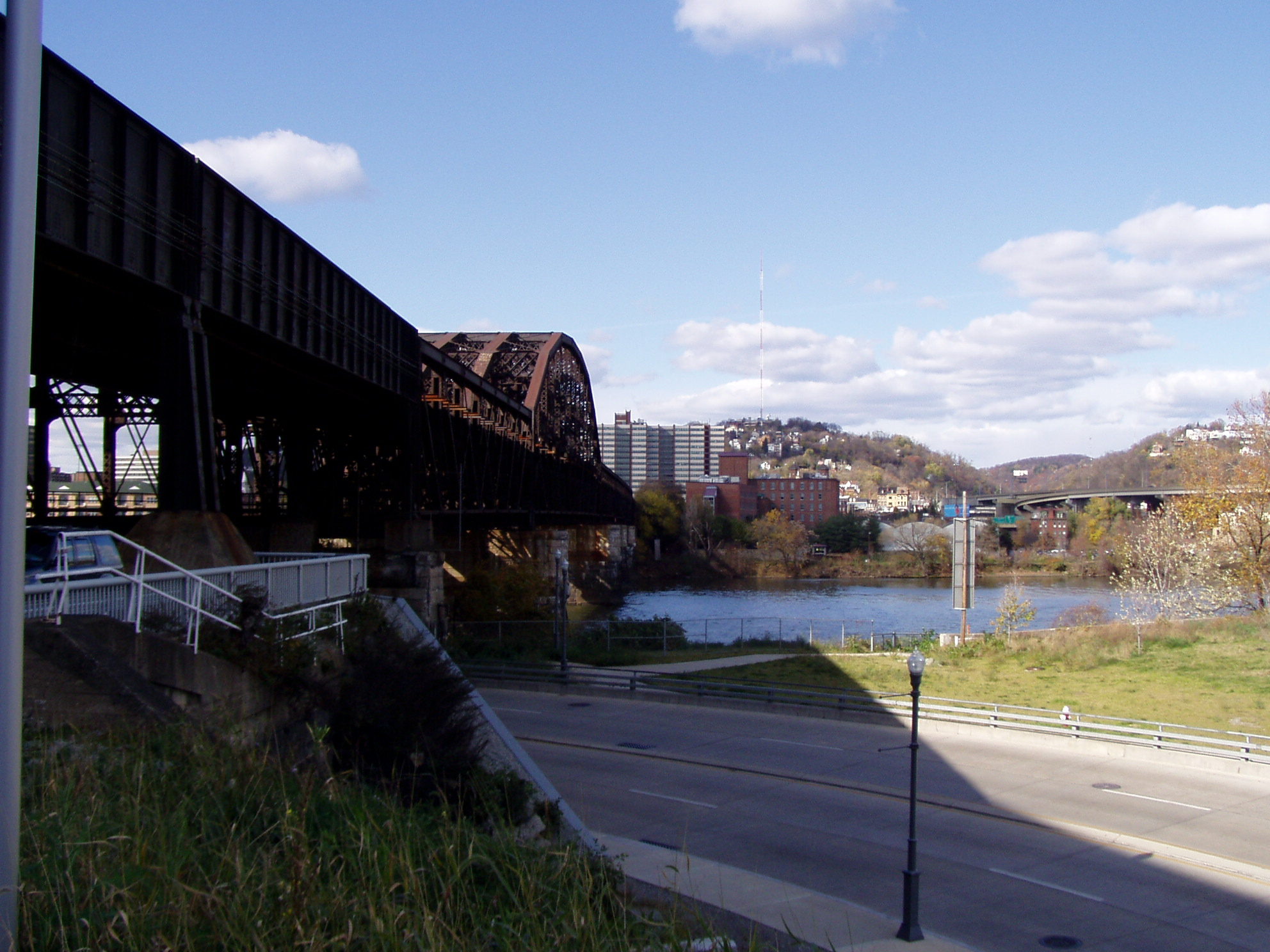
From south bank

== See also ==
- List of crossings of the Allegheny River
