= Nickel Plate Depot (Chicago) =

Railway station in Chicago, Illinois, United States

Coordinates: 41°52′04″N 87°37′52″W

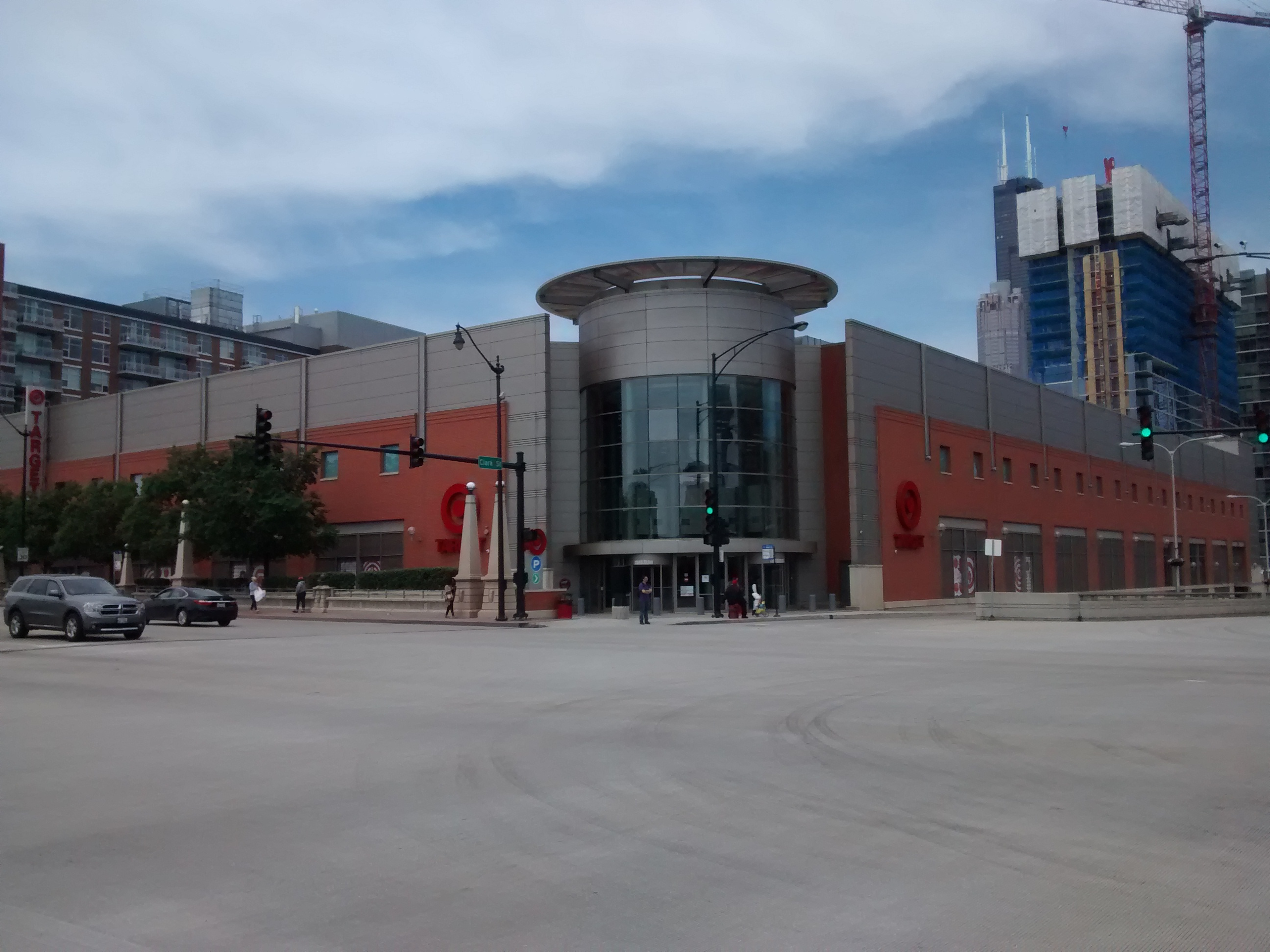
A Target store, located at the former location of the Nickel Plate Depot

The passenger depot of the New York, Chicago and St. Louis Railroad (Nickel Plate Road) in Chicago, was located at the northwest corner of Roosevelt Road (12th Street) and Clark Street, just east of the main line of the Lake Shore and Michigan Southern Railway to its LaSalle Street Station. It operated at the Nickel Plate Depot from 1892 until 1898 when the railroad became a tenant at LaSalle, which it continued to use until it abandoned passenger service in 1965.

In 2007, Centrum Properties announced plans for a mixed-use development on the site of the rail yards with a Target department store occupying the location where the station once stood. Because of the 2008 financial crisis, much of the Roosevelt Collection remained vacant for several years after it was completed. Though the project cost Centrum $350 million to construct, it sold the complex in March 2011 for approximately $160–175 million.
