= LaSalle Street Station =

Commuter rail station in Chicago, Illinois

LaSalle Street Station

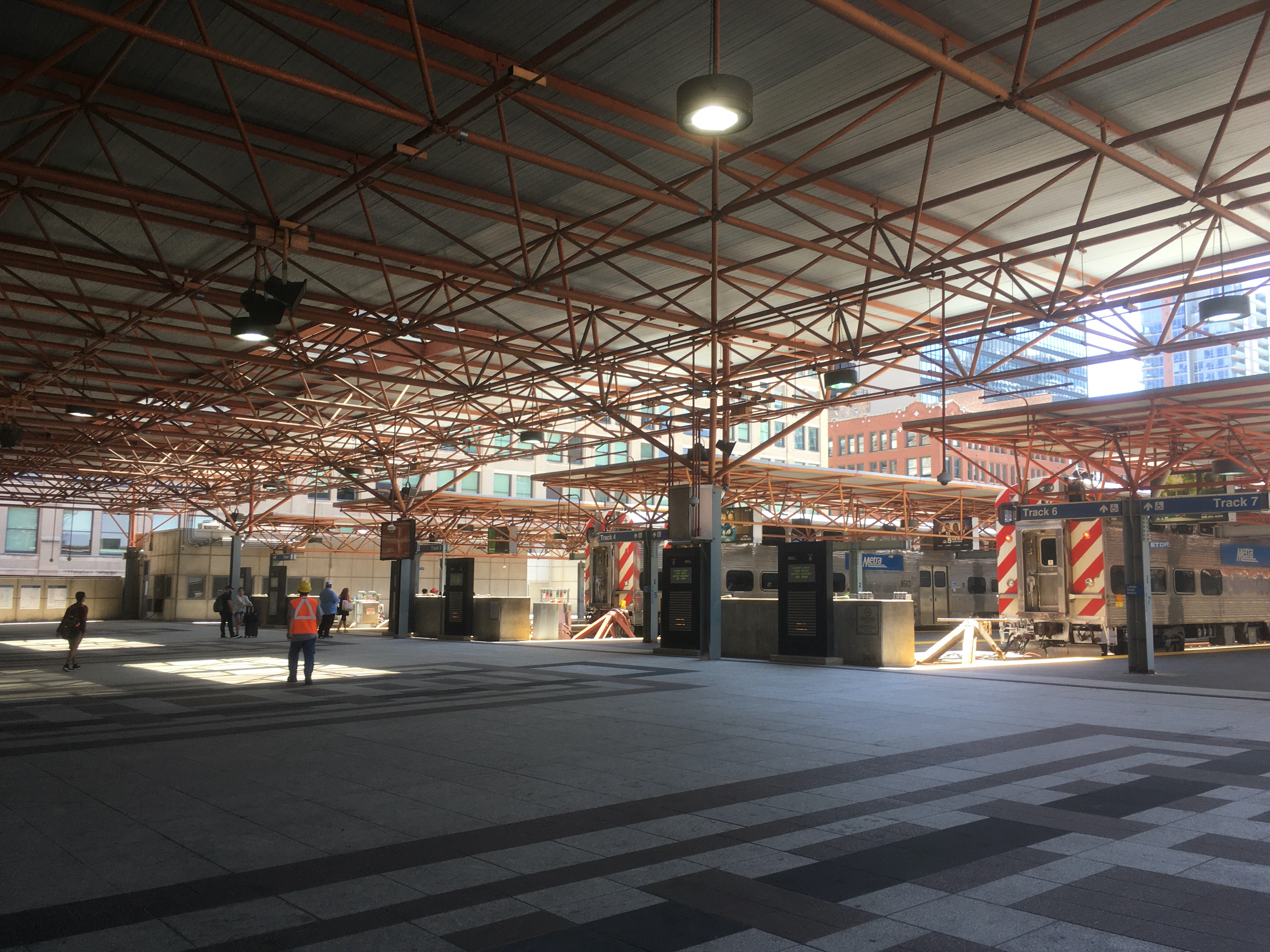
- Platforms of LaSalle Street Station

General information
- Location: 414 South LaSalle Street, Chicago, Illinois 60605
- Coordinates: (400 S/140 W); 41.87553°N 87.63239°W
- Owner: Metra
- Platforms: 2 side platforms, 3 island platforms
- Tracks: 8
- Connections: Chicago "L": Brown Orange Pink Purple at LaSalle/Van Buren; Blue at LaSalle; CTA Buses; ChicaGo Dash

Construction
- Accessible: Yes

Other information
- Fare zone: 1

History
- Opened: October 10, 1852
- Rebuilt: 1903, 1981–1985, 2011

Services
Preceding station	Metra	Following station
35th Street toward Joliet	Rock Island	Terminus
Future services
Preceding station	Metra	Following station
35th Street toward Manhattan	SouthWest Service	Terminus
Former services
Preceding station	Chicago, Rock Island and Pacific Railroad	Following station
Terminus	Main Line	Englewood toward Colorado Springs
Terminus	Suburban Service	Englewood toward Joliet
Preceding station	New York Central Railroad	Following station
Terminus	Main Line	Englewood toward New York
Terminus	Chicago – Cairo	Englewood toward Cairo
Terminus	Chicago – Hammond	Englewood toward Hammond
Terminus	Chesterton Local	Englewood toward Chesterton
Preceding station	Nickel Plate Road	Following station
Terminus	Main Line	Englewood toward Buffalo
Preceding station	Chicago and Eastern Illinois Railroad	Following station
Terminus	Main Line 1904–1913	31st Street toward Evansville
Terminus	Chicago – St. Louis 1904–1913	31st Street toward St. Louis
Track layout
Location

LaSalle Street Station is a commuter rail terminal at 414 South LaSalle Street in downtown Chicago. First used as a rail terminal in 1852, it was a major intercity rail terminal for the New York Central Railroad until 1968, and for the Chicago, Rock Island and Pacific Railroad until 1978, but now serves only Metra's Rock Island District. The present structure became the fifth station on the site when its predecessor was demolished in 1981 and replaced by the new station and the One Financial Place (now 425 South Financial Place) tower for the Chicago Stock Exchange. The Chicago Board of Trade Building, Willis Tower, and Harold Washington Library are nearby.

== History ==
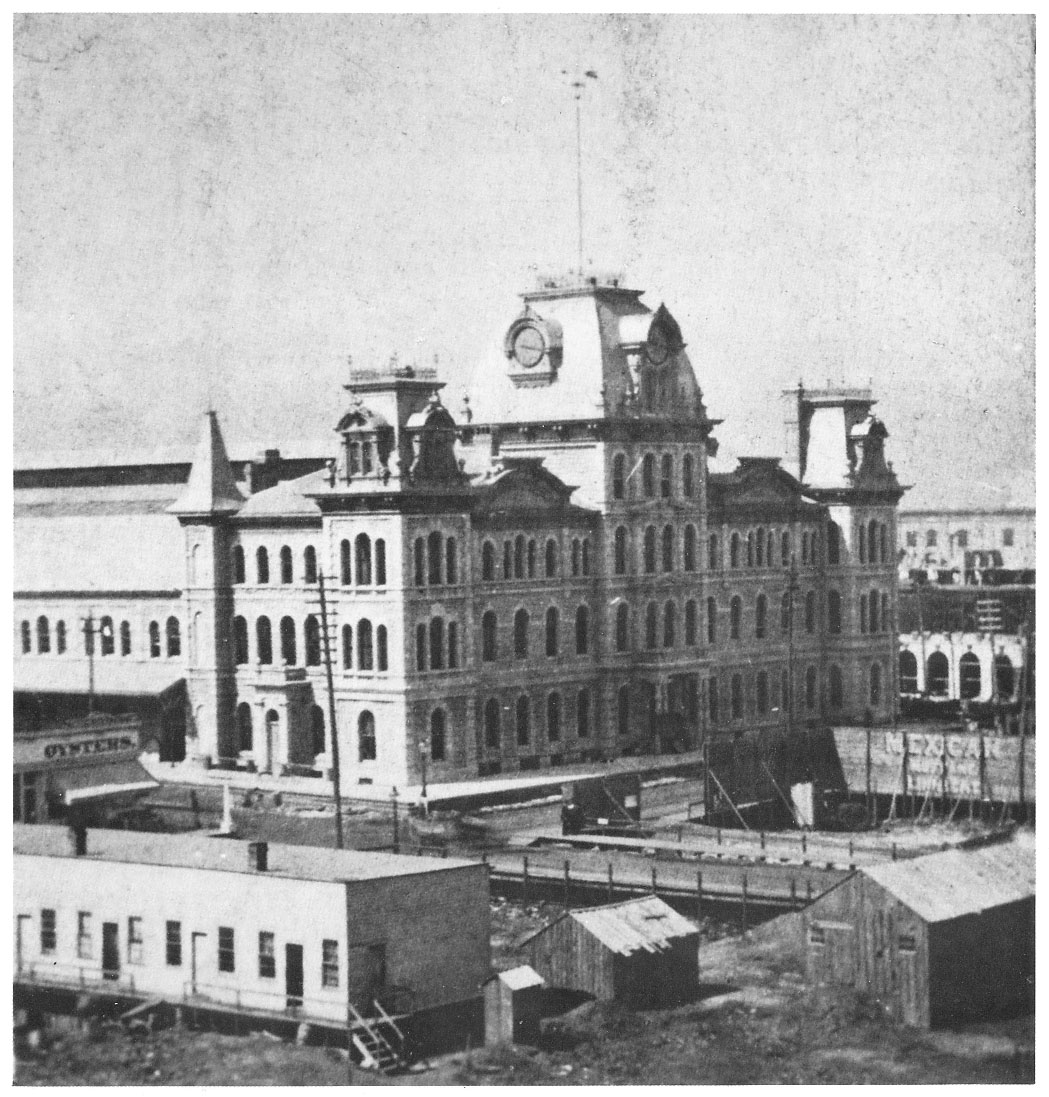
The station as it was rebuilt in 1871 (demolished in 1903)

The first station on the site opened on October 10, 1852, with an extension of the Chicago and Rock Island Railroad from 22nd Street. At this point, the Northern Indiana and Chicago Railroad (future LS&MS) had a depot at 12th Street, alongside another Rock Island depot. In December 1866 a new station opened, and the Michigan Southern and Northern Indiana Railroad joined the Rock Island as a tenant.

The Great Chicago Fire of October 1871 destroyed the station, which was rebuilt shortly afterwards. The post-fire station was demolished to make way for a new station designed by the architectural firm Frost & Granger which opened July 1, 1903 and stood until 1981. This station was a set for Alfred Hitchcock's 1959 North by Northwest, starring Cary Grant and Eva Marie Saint, and in the 1973 movie The Sting starring Paul Newman and Robert Redford.

From its completion in 1882, the New York, Chicago and St. Louis Railroad (Nickel Plate Road) ran over the Lake Shore and Michigan Southern Railway from a junction at Grand Crossing neighborhood north to downtown Chicago, where it had its own terminal south of LaSalle between 1892 and 1898. The LS&MS quickly gained control of the Nickel Plate, and later allowed it into its LaSalle Street Station as a tenant. In July 1916, the by-then New York Central sold the Nickel Plate to the Van Sweringens, but it continued to operate into LaSalle until the end of Nickel Plate passenger service.

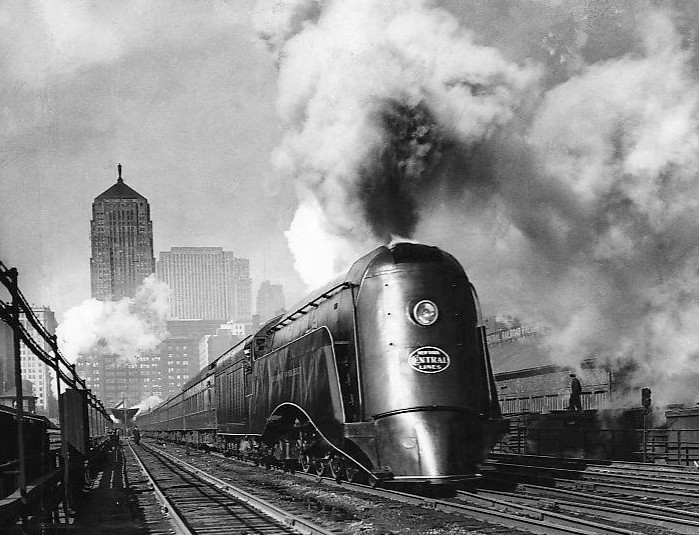
The 20th Century Limited being pulled out of LaSalle Street Station by the Commodore Vanderbilt locomotive

From July 31, 1904, to August 1, 1913, trains of the Chicago and Eastern Illinois Railroad also used LaSalle Street Station, which reached it via trackage rights on the Chicago, Rock Island and Pacific from Ashburn. During this period, the C&EI was operated by the St. Louis–San Francisco Railway, which was itself controlled by the Chicago, Rock Island and Pacific from 1901 to 1916.

Map of former services serving the LaSalle Street station

On January 18, 1957, trains of the Michigan Central Railroad began serving LaSalle, operating on the New York Central Railroad's Lake Shore and Michigan Southern Railway from its former crossing at Porter, Indiana to Chicago. LS&MS and Michigan Central trains (both part of the New York Central system) last used LaSalle on October 26, 1968 (soon after the merger into Penn Central); the next day, it began operation into Union Station via a connection in Whiting, Indiana and the Pittsburgh, Fort Wayne and Chicago Railway.

Amtrak came into existence on May 1, 1971, taking over most intercity rail service across the nation. However, LaSalle was unaffected: Penn Central's services via former New York Central tracks had been relocated to Union Station as noted above. The Rock Island opted out of Amtrak and continued to operate intercity service in the form of the Quad Cities Rocket and Peoria Rocket, operating to Rock Island and Peoria, respectively. These final intercity trains serving LaSalle made their final trips on December 31, 1978, ending the station's role as a terminal for intercity passenger trains.

A connection at Englewood Union Station was completed on October 15, 1971, to allow the Rock Island to also operate over the PFW&C to Union Station, but the failing Rock Island decided to continue using LaSalle. The Rock Island ended intercity passenger service in 1978, but continued operating its commuter trains until handing them to the Chicago and North Western Railway in 1980. Only a year later, C&NW handed the former Rock Island commuter lines to the RTA's newly formed operating arm, the Northeast Illinois Regional Commuter Railroad Corporation. It became part of the RTA Commuter Rail Division, now Metra, in 1984.

From 1972–75 the Rock Island operated a restaurant called Track One, using two former railroad cars parked on track 1 at the station. The two cars, the dining car Golden Harvest and the club-lounge Pacific Shore, had previously served on the Golden State Limited.

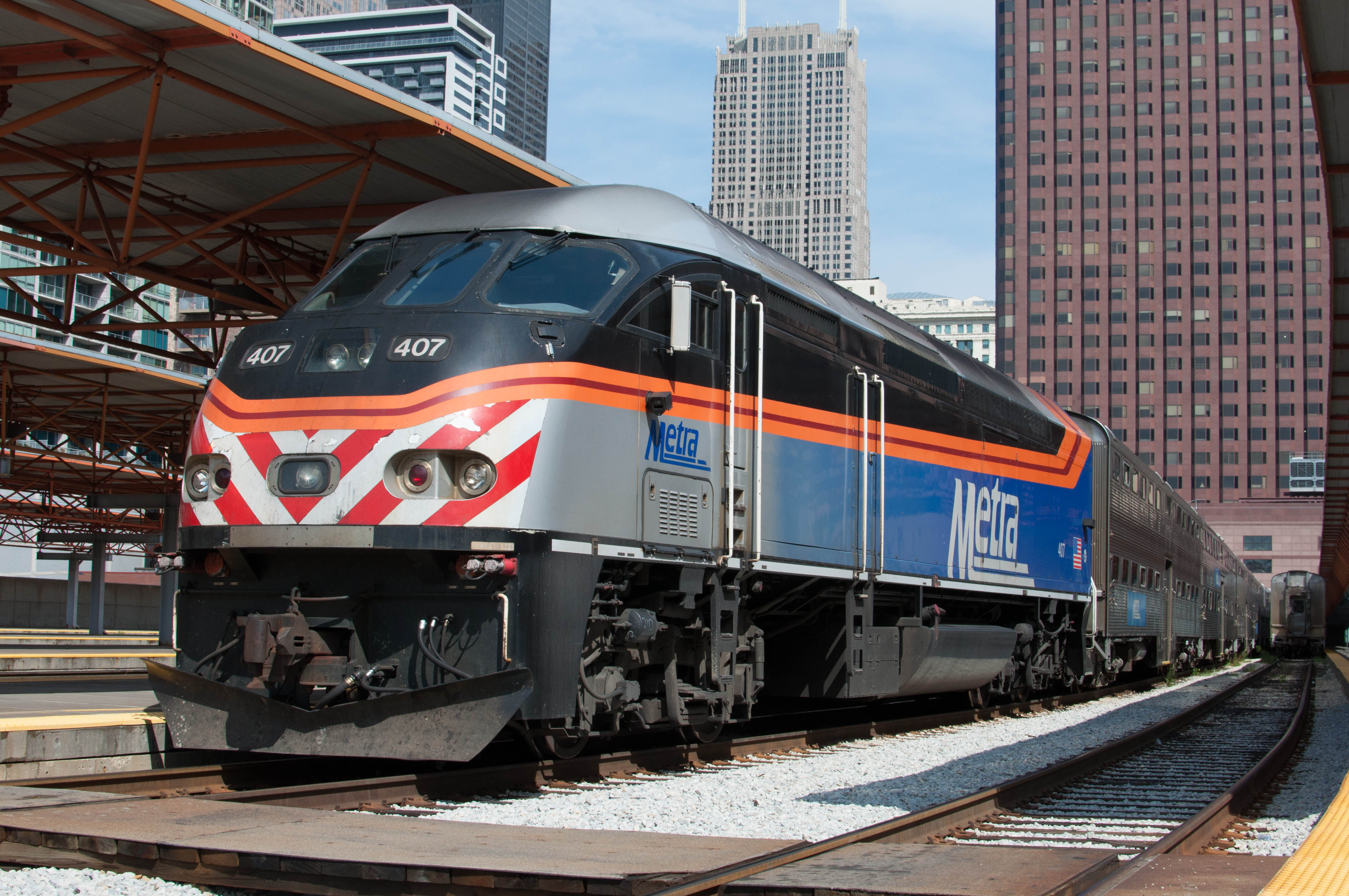
Metra train at LaSalle Street Station

In June 2011, The Chicago Department of Transportation opened the LaSalle/Congress Intermodal Transfer Center alongside the station as a bus terminal, to serve people transferring to CTA buses as well as Blue Line trains at LaSalle.

On Father's Day weekend in June 2017, Nickel Plate 765 became the first steam locomotive to enter LaSalle Street Station since Southern Railway 4501 visited the station in 1973. The 765 pulled trips to Joliet, Illinois over Metra's Rock Island District dubbed the Joliet Rocket. One of the cars in this excursion train was the former New York Central observation car Hickory Creek, a car built for the 20th Century Limited, which hadn't been to the station since December 3, 1967. Of note, the Hickory Creek was the last car on the final run of the 20th Century Limited to leave LaSalle on December 3, 1967.

== Future plans ==
Although only Metra's Rock Island District trains now use LaSalle, additional service is planned. Metra's proposed SouthEast Service would terminate at LaSalle, and the Chicago Region Environmental and Transportation Efficiency Program (CREATE) infrastructure improvement program would allow trains from Metra's SouthWest Service to use the terminal.

== Services ==
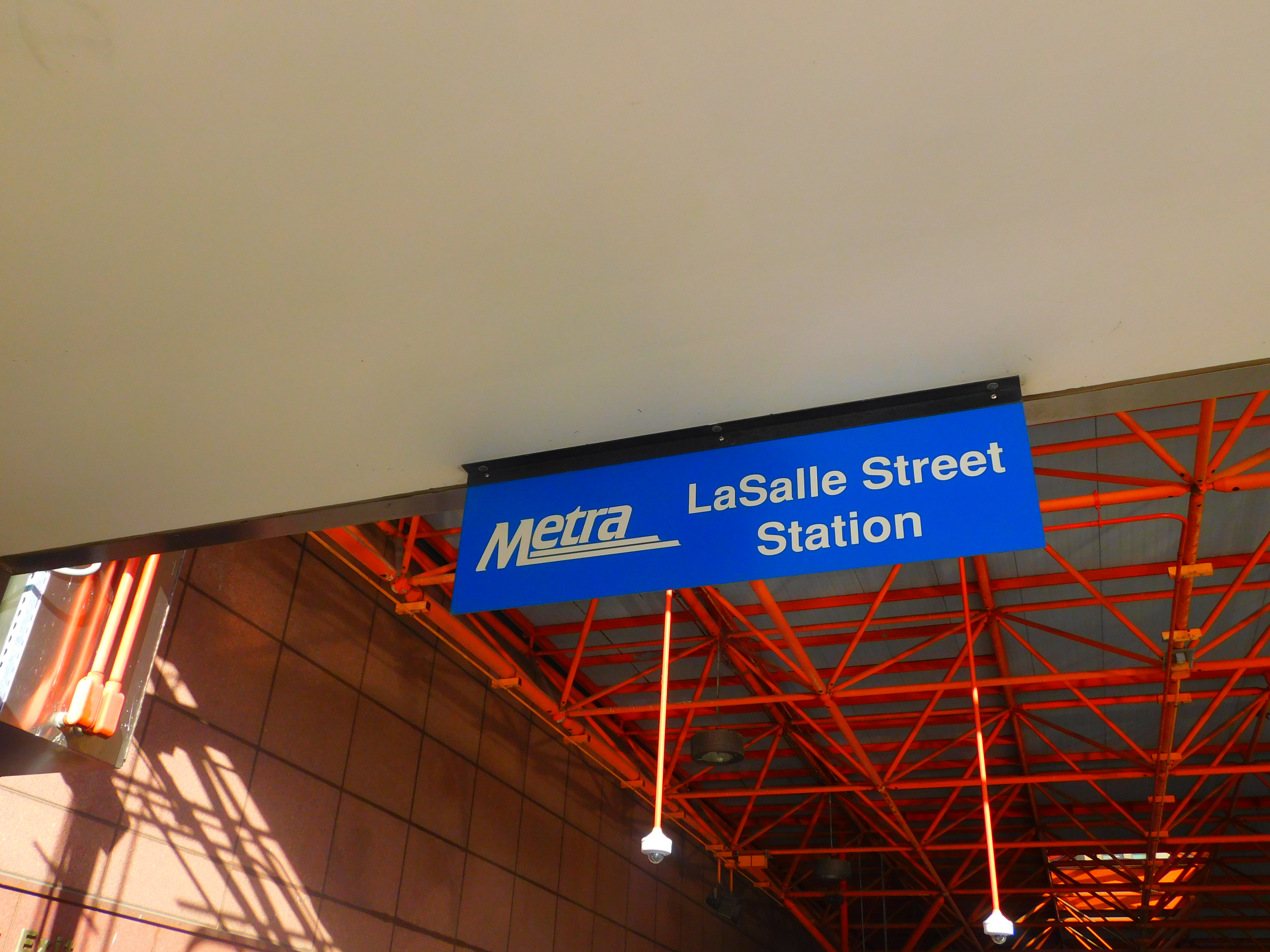
Station sign

LaSalle was a terminal for the following lines and intercity trains:

- Chicago, Rock Island and Pacific Railroad (until 1978)
- New York Central Railroad (up to October 26, 1968)
- New York, Chicago and St. Louis Railroad (Nickel Plate)
- Chicago and Eastern Illinois Railroad (July 31, 1904 to August 1, 1913)
- Michigan Central Railroad (part of the New York Central) (January 18, 1957 to October 26, 1968)

Among the most famous name trains that terminated at LaSalle were the New York Central's 20th Century Limited from 1902 until 1967 and the Rock Island-Southern Pacific Golden State Limited from 1902 until 1968.

=== Metra commuter rail services ===
- to Joliet, IL
- to Blue Island, IL - Vermont Street

LaSalle still serves commuter trains on Metra's Rock Island District. As of 2007, approximately 17,000 people boarded Metra trains at LaSalle each day. It is planned that, in the future, Metra's SouthWest Service will be shifted from the Union Station to LaSalle Street. Additionally, the proposed Metra SouthEast Service would terminate at LaSalle if built.

== Bus connections ==
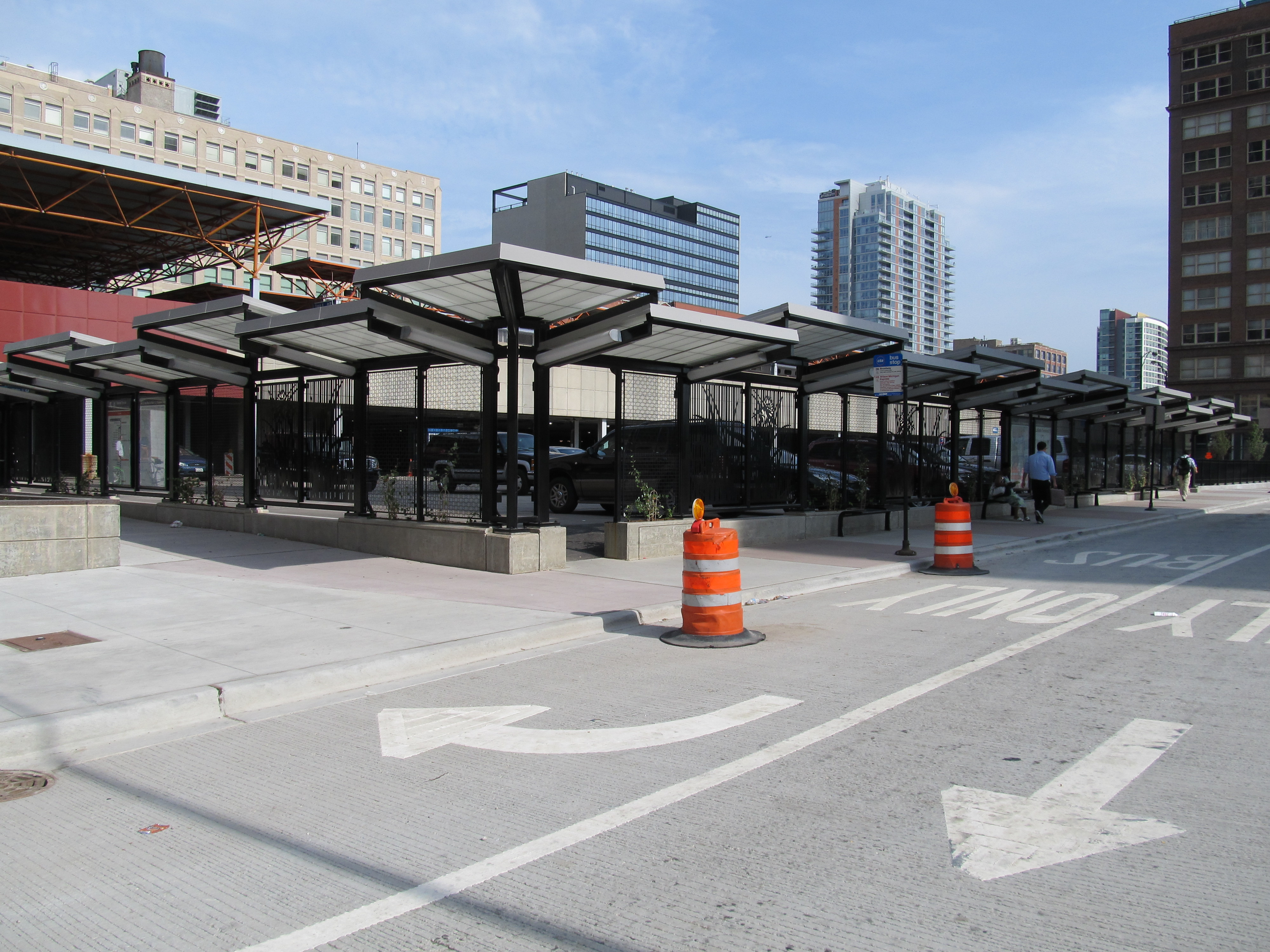
Intermodal Transfer Center for CTA buses

CTA

- 1 Bronzeville/Union Station
- 7 Harrison
- 22 Clark (Owl Service)
- 24 Wentworth
- 36 Broadway
- 126 Jackson
- 130 Museum Campus (summer only)
- 151 Sheridan
- 156 LaSalle

ChicaGo Dash

- Shuttle service between Downtown Chicago and Valparaiso (Rush hour only)

== Gallery ==
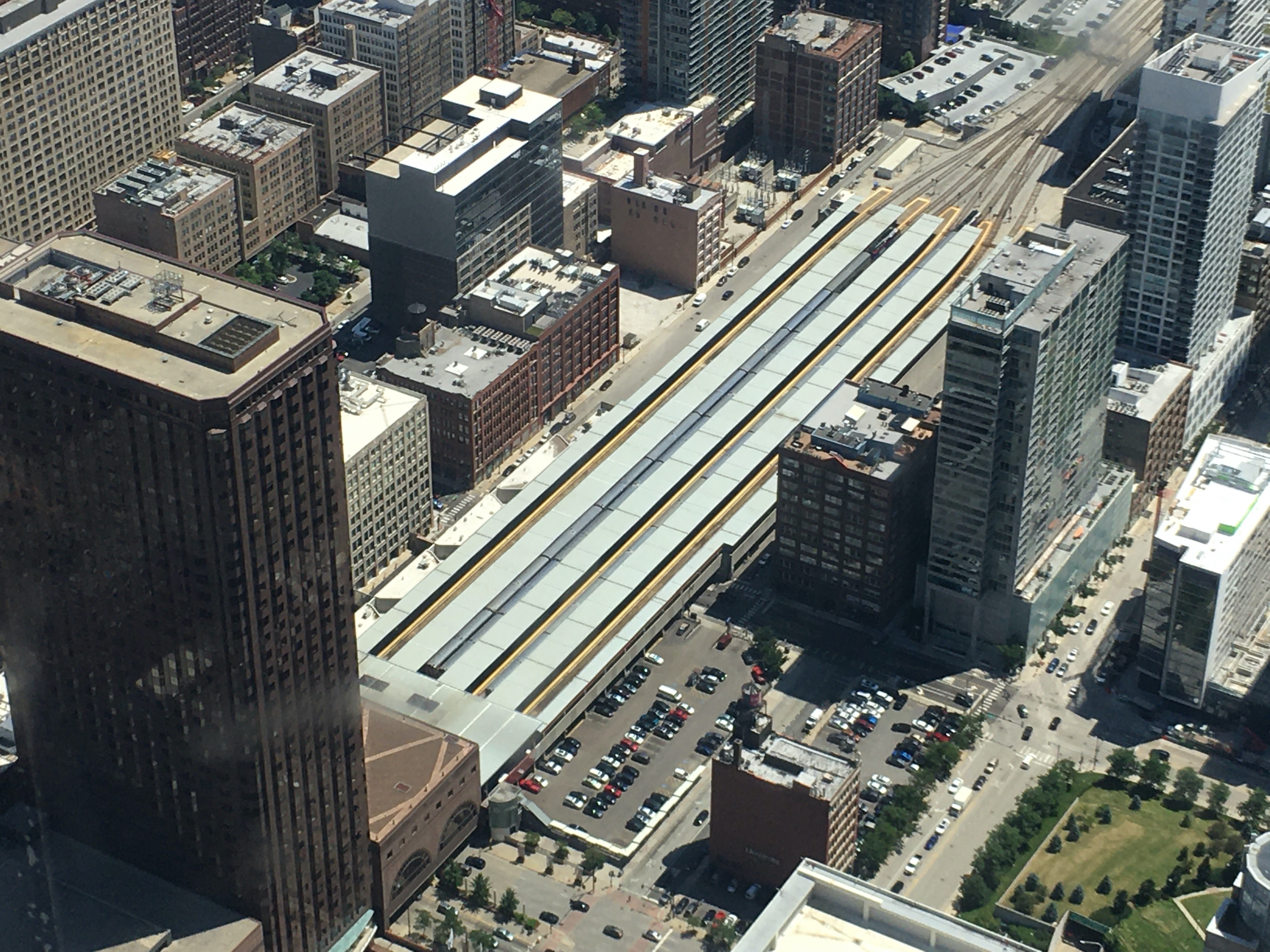
The Chicago Stock Exchange/LaSalle Train Station as viewed from the Willis (Sears) Tower in July 2019

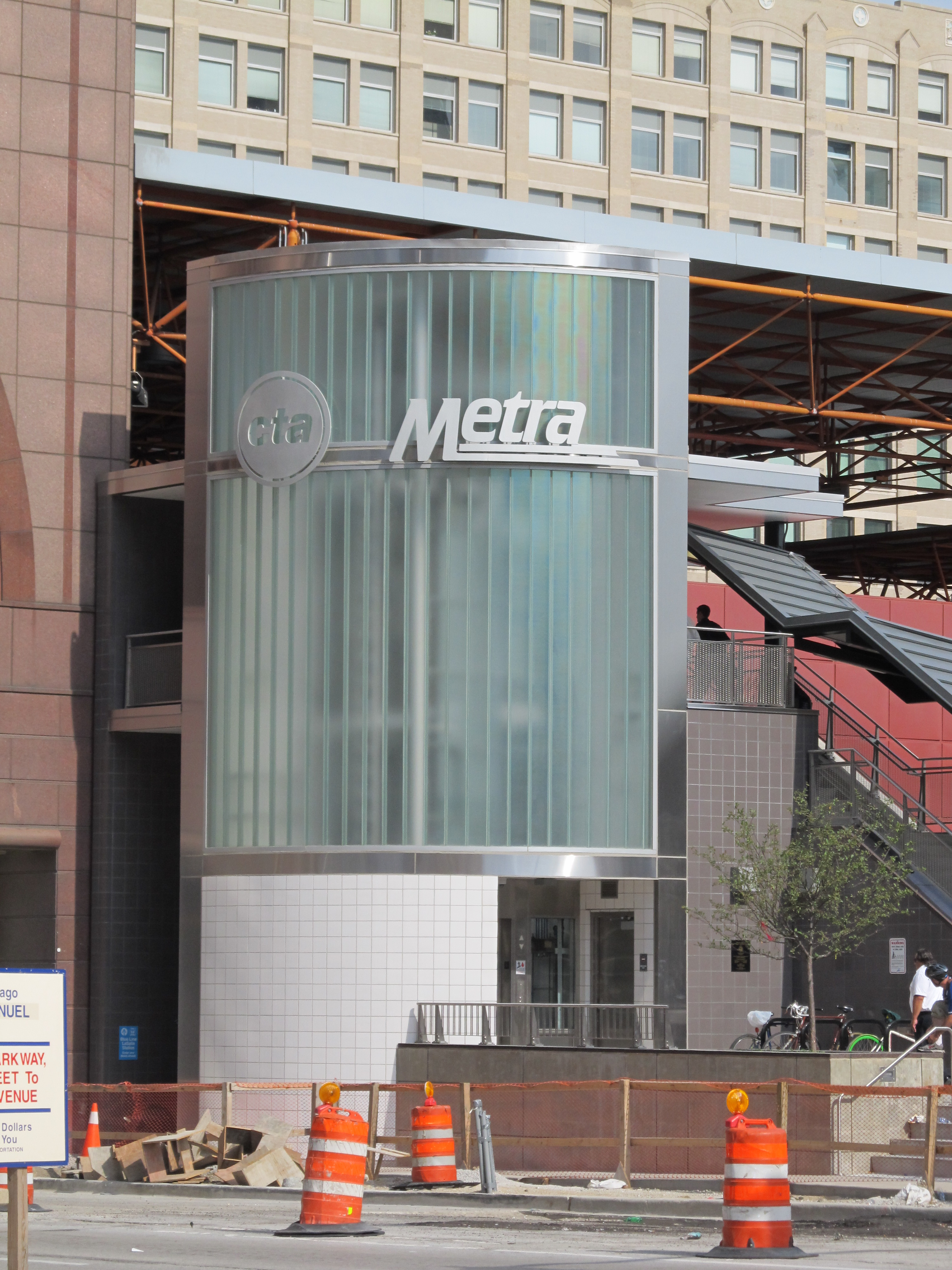
LaSalle Intermodal Transfer Center

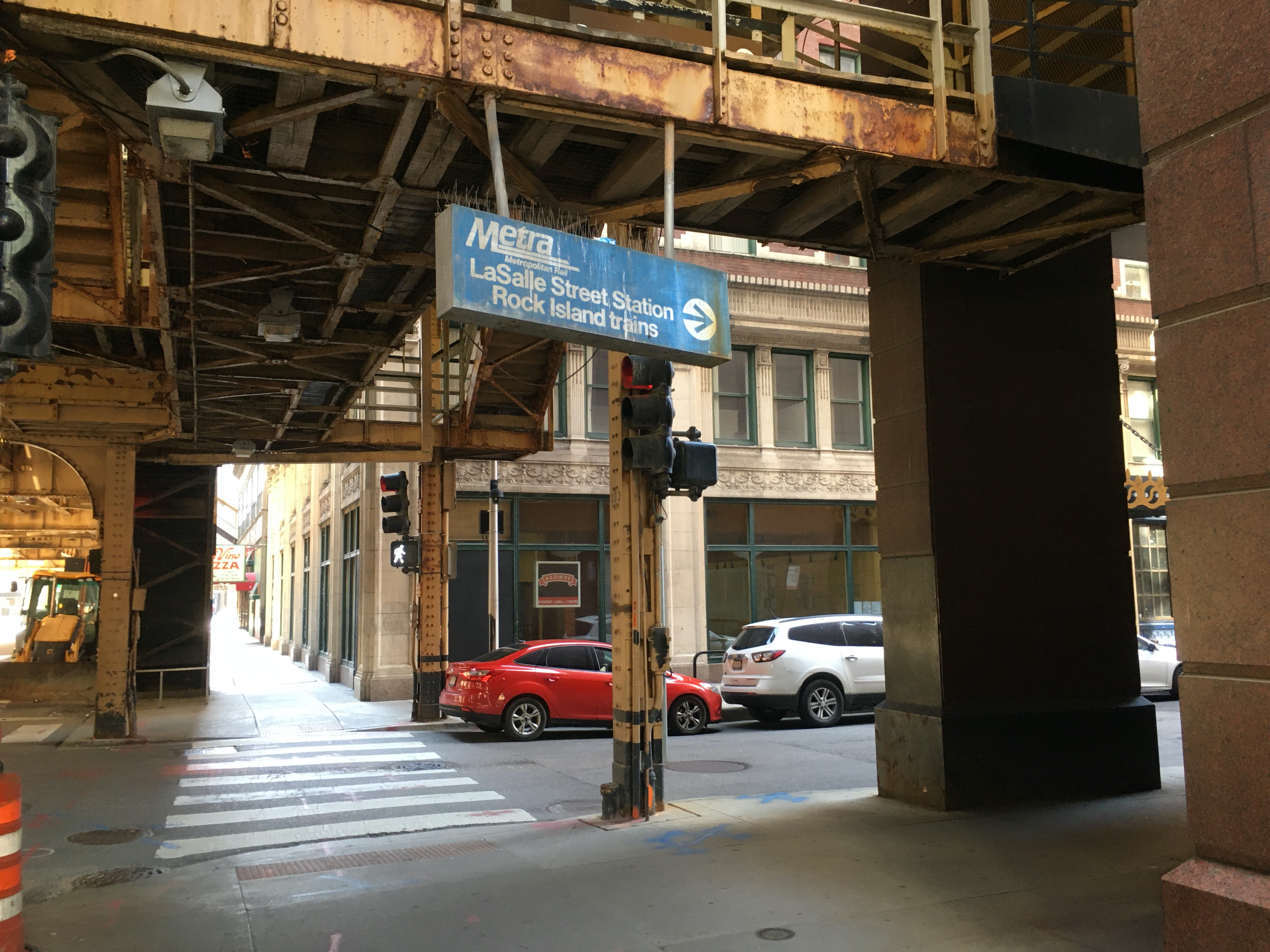
Sign for LaSalle Street Station near LaSalle/Van Buren on the Chicago "L" Loop

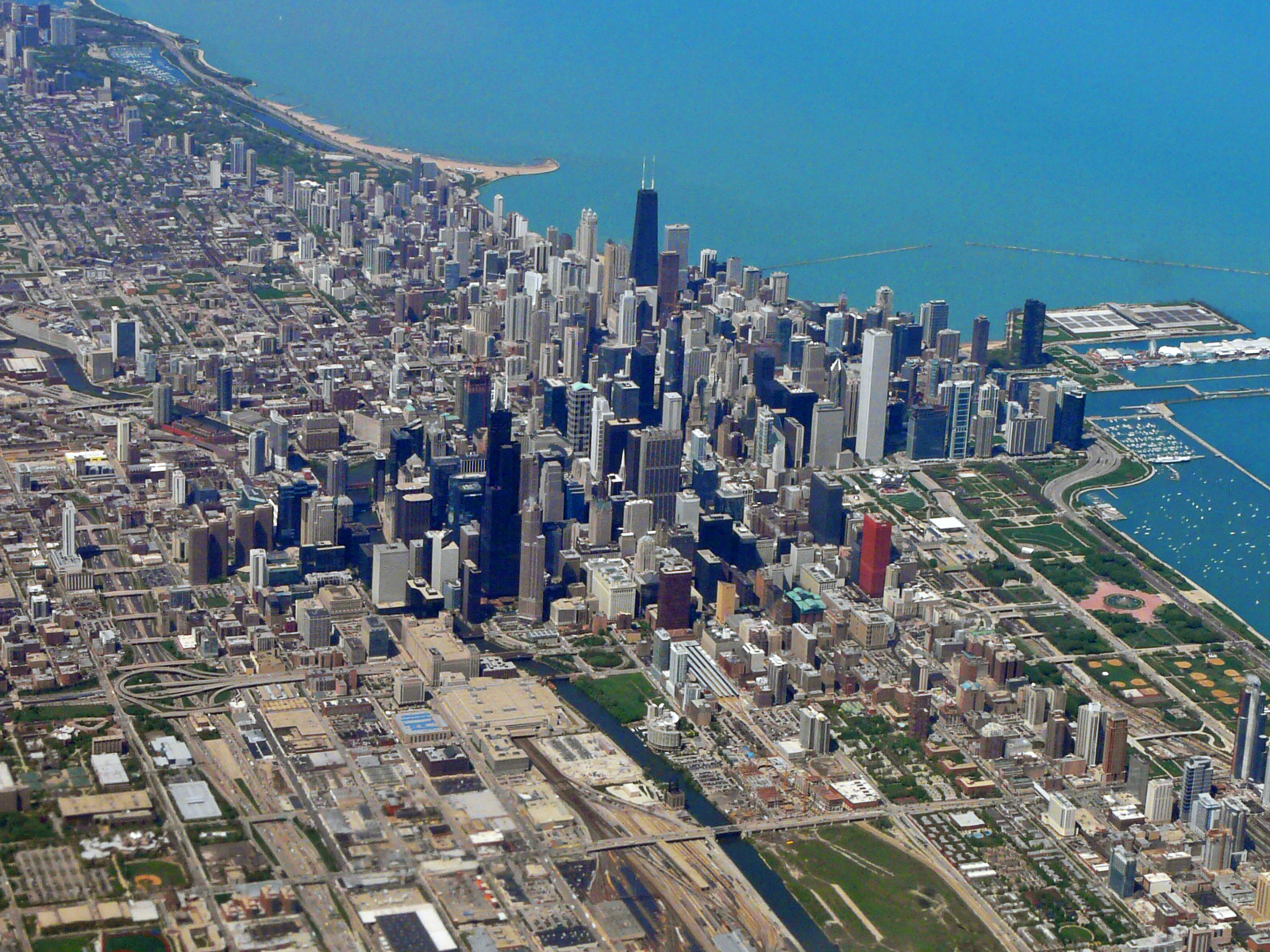
The Chicago Loop with the platforms and tracks of LaSalle Street Station visible in the foreground east of the Chicago River. Union Station and its tracks can be seen west of the Chicago River.
