= Willow Creek, Indiana =

- Interactive map of Willow Creek, Indiana
- Coordinates: 41°35′9.6″N 87°10′58.8″W
- Country: United States
- State: Indiana
- County: Porter
- Township: Portage
- City: Portage
- Named after: Willow Creek (stream)
- Elevation: 633 ft (193 m)
- Time zone: UTC-6 (CST)
  - Summer (DST): UTC-5 (CDT)
- ZIP code: 46368
- Area code: 219
- GNIS feature ID: 446099

Willow Creek is a neighborhood in the city of Portage, Indiana in Porter County. It is the location of the junction of the Garrett Subdivision, Porter Subdivision, and Barr Subdivision, all sections of the CSX Railroad.

== History ==
Willow Creek is the site of the Willow Creek Confrontation. According to a marker placed by the Indiana Historical Bureau, this occurred when the Michigan Central Railroad refused to allow a Baltimore and Ohio Railroad line to cross its tracks. The Michigan Central briefly defied court orders and the state militia, but eventually a crossing was built at Willow Creek Station.
