= Cleveland Line (Norfolk Southern) =

Rail line in Ohio and Pennsylvania, U.S.

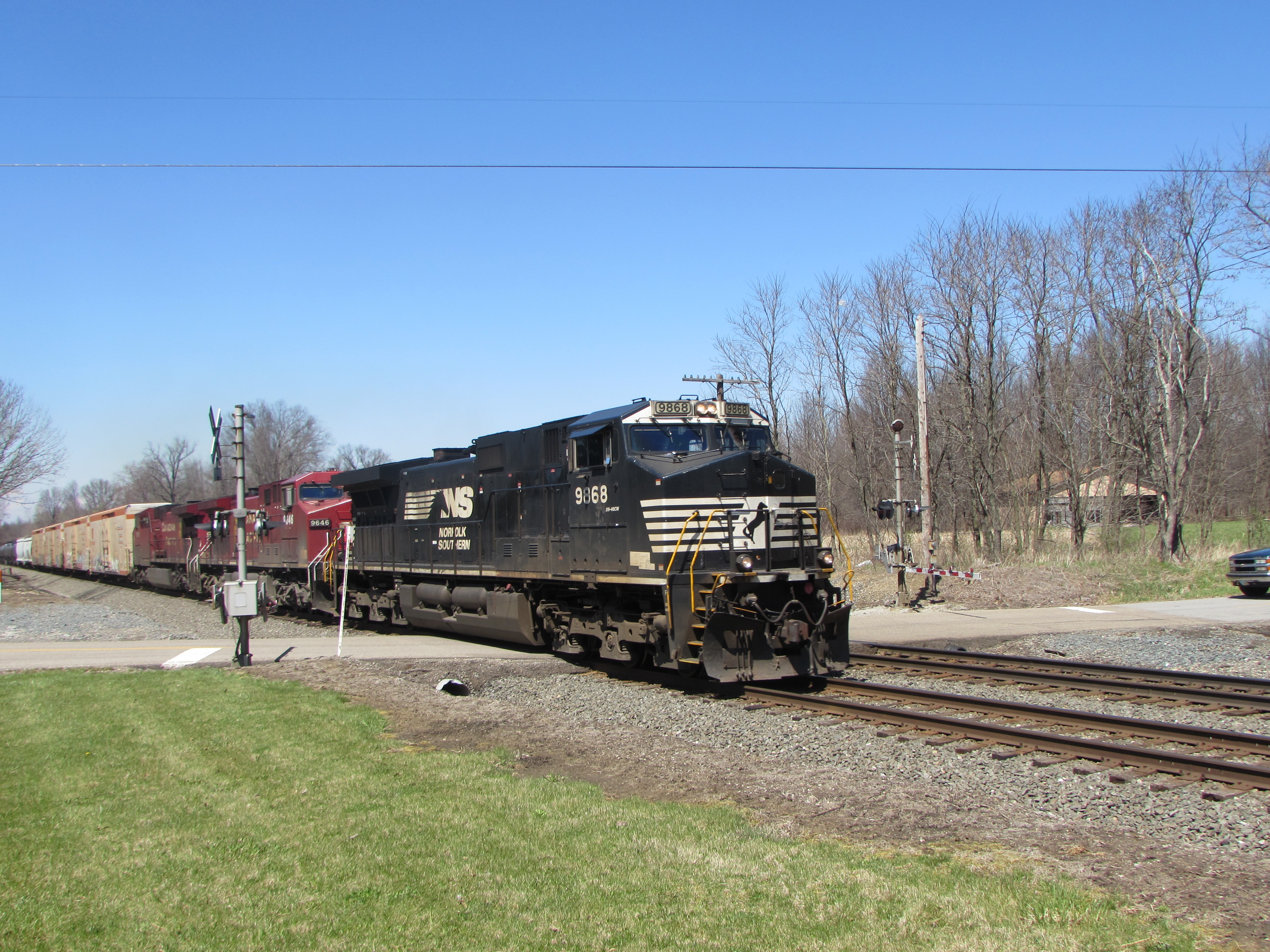
- Norfolk Southern Mixed Freight Train heads eastbound through Atwater, Ohio, along the Cleveland Line

Overview
- Status: Active
- Owner: Norfolk Southern
- Locale: Ohio, Pennsylvania
- Termini: Rochester; Cleveland

Service
- Type: Freight, Passenger
- System: NS
- Operator(s): Norfolk Southern, Amtrak

Technical
- Num of tracks: 2
- Track gauge: 4 ft 8 1/2 in (1,435 mm) standard gauge

The Cleveland Line is a railroad line owned and operated by Norfolk Southern Railway (NS), in the U.S. states of Ohio and Pennsylvania. The line runs from Rochester, Pennsylvania, to Cleveland, Ohio, along a former Pennsylvania Railroad line.

Amtrak's Capitol Limited uses the Cleveland Line between Cleveland and Alliance. Both the eastbound and westbound train are scheduled to use the line during midnight and early morning.

== Routing ==
From Rochester, the line travels west following the Ohio River between Beaver, Pennsylvania, and Yellow Creek Ohio, where the line turns northwest towards Cleveland. Along the way, the line junctions with the Fort Wayne Line at Alliance, Ohio. At Alliance, most traffic diverges off the Fort Wayne Line and on to the Cleveland Line in order to reach the Chicago Line in Cleveland. From Alliance, the line continues northwest, going through locations such as Ravenna, Hudson, and Maple Heights until the line ends and merges with the Chicago Line in downtown Cleveland.

== History ==
The Cleveland & Pittsburgh Railroad was chartered in 1836, due to public support in building a railroad line between Cleveland and Pittsburgh. Construction of the line was completed in 1852, with additional branch lines to Akron, Ohio, and Wheeling, West Virginia. In 1871, the C&P was leased to the Pennsylvania Railroad for a 999-year lease, thus giving the PRR access to Cleveland. During the Pennsylvania Railroad years, the line mainly hosted coal and mineral trains from the Ohio River Valley area that were bound for Cleveland. The line also hosted passenger trains between the charter railroad's namesake cities, notably The Buckeye Limited (later renamed The Clevelander) and the Steeler.

In 1968, the Pennsylvania Railroad merged with long time rival New York Central Railroad, to form Penn Central Transportation Company. The merger essentially failed, resulting in the Penn Central declaring bankruptcy by 1970.

Conrail was created in 1976 to pick up the pieces of several railroads that had fallen into bankruptcy, which largely included the Penn Central. By 1981, Conrail was turning into a profitable operation, due in part to the Staggers Rail Act of 1980. Around this time, Conrail began an extensive double tracking and upgrading of the former C&P between Alliance and Cleveland to accommodate for a planned increase in train traffic. Conrail had planned to reroute all of its Chicago bound train traffic that had used the Fort Wayne Line up to that point, opting instead to reroute that traffic to the former NYC Water Level route to the north, using the former C&P as the bridge line between the two routes. Upgrading of the line was eventually completed, allowing traffic between Pittsburgh and Chicago to use the revised route utilizing a newly installed connection track between the Fort Wayne Line and the C&P at Alliance. This connection track was later double tracked to eliminate bottlenecking traffic.

Ownership of the line was passed on to Norfolk Southern after the Conrail split between CSX Transportation and Norfolk Southern in 1999. Norfolk Southern continues to use the line as part of its Keystone Division.

== See also ==
- Fort Wayne Line
- List of Norfolk Southern Railway lines
- Conrail
- Pennsylvania Railroad
