= Chicago, Fort Wayne and Eastern Railroad =

Short line railroad

Chicago, Ft. Wayne & Eastern Railroad

Overview
- Headquarters: Fort Wayne, Indiana
- Reporting mark: CFE
- Locale: Indiana, Ohio
- Dates of operation: 2004–

Technical
- Track gauge: 4 ft 8 1/2 in (1,435 mm) standard gauge
- Length: 279 miles (449 km)
- Operating speed: 40 mph (64 km/h)

Other
- Website: https://www.gwrr.com/cfe/

The Chicago, Ft. Wayne & Eastern Railroad (reporting mark CFE) is a short line railroad offering service from Tolleston, Indiana to Crestline, Ohio, United States over the former Fort Wayne Line of the Pennsylvania Railroad. Operations commenced in 2004 as a division of the Central Railroad of Indianapolis (CERA), under the overall corporate ownership of RailAmerica. CFE operates 279 miles (449 km) of rail leased from CSX.

== History ==
Conrail acquired the line in 1976, and later sold some of it to the Norfolk Southern to relieve that company's ex-Nickel Plate Road main line. CSX Transportation acquired the entire line in the 1999 breakup of Conrail, and began to make improvements, including new crossing signals, paving crossings, and weed-whacking the railroad. After this was complete, signs were posted at each crossing notifying motorists of an increase in train traffic.

In 2004, operations under the Chicago, Ft. Wayne & Eastern Railroad name began; from the beginning of operations, the railroad has been owned by RailAmerica. In 2011, Joseph (Joe) Parsons, a former Norfolk Southern supervisor, was named General Manager of the Chicago, Fort Wayne, & Eastern Railroad, headquartered in Fort Wayne, Indiana.

On July 23, 2012, Genesee & Wyoming announced that it intended to purchase RailAmerica in a deal valued at $1.39 billion. Approval of the purchase was granted by the U.S. Surface Transportation Board on December 19, 2012, and ownership of the Chicago, Ft. Wayne & Eastern was transferred to the G&W.

As of 2023, there are many interchanges in CFE:

BNSF (Chicago, Illinois); Belt Railway of Chicago (Chicago); Canadian National (Chicago); CPKC (Chicago); Chicago Rail Link (Chicago); Chicago South Shore & South Bend Railroad (Chicago); CSX (Crestline, Ohio and Lima, Ohio); Gary Railway (Chicago); Iowa Interstate Railroad (Chicago); Indiana Harbor Belt Railroad (Chicago); Indiana & Ohio Railway (Lima); Manufacturers' Junction Railway (Chicago); Norfolk Southern (Fort Wayne, Indiana and Lima); South Chicago and Indiana Harbor Railway (Chicago); Union Pacific (Chicago); Wisconsin and Southern Railroad (Chicago).

== Traffic ==
As of 2023, CFE owns 323 total miles, 184 in Indiana, and 139 in Ohio and Illinois. CFE has a capacity of 286,000.
