= Baltimore and Ohio Chicago Terminal Railroad =

Railroad in the United States

Overview
- Headquarters: Chicago, Illinois
- Reporting mark: BOCT
- Locale: Chicago area
- Dates of operation: 1910–

Technical
- Track gauge: 4 ft 8 1/2 in (1,435 mm) standard gauge

The Baltimore and Ohio Chicago Terminal Railroad (reporting mark BOCT) is a terminal railroad in the Chicago area, formerly giving various other companies access to (Chicago's) Grand Central Station. It also served to connect those railroads for freight transfers, and is now controlled by CSX Corporation, the successor to the Baltimore and Ohio Railroad.

== History ==
By 1886, the Wisconsin Central Railroad had formed a new railway company, called the Chicago and Great Western Railroad (C&GW, not to be confused with the Chicago Great Western Railway) to build a new line from a connection with the WC at Forest Park into the city, and to construct the Grand Central Station, which opened in December 1890.

In June 1887, a subsidiary of the Northern Pacific Railroad called the Chicago & Calumet Terminal Railway (C&CT) consolidated several terminal railroads in the Chicago area with lines running between the Atchison, Topeka & Santa Fe Railway at McCook, Illinois to the south and south-east to Hammond, Indiana and a connection with the Baltimore & Ohio Railroad (B&O).

In March 1890, another subsidiary of the Northern Pacific Railroad bought the C&GW along with several other WC lines in the Chicago area, consolidated them all as the Chicago & Northern Pacific Railroad (C&NP). The next month, the WC had itself leased to the Northern Pacific. As they were both controlled by the same railroad, the C&NP and the C&CT were linked together with new construction and trackage rights. The lease arrangement between the Wisconsin Central and the Northern Pacific worked until the Panic of 1893, when the WC was freed from the lease, and the C&NP was again placed under the control of the WC. Weakened by the prolonged economic downturn, the C&NP was bankrupt by October 1893.

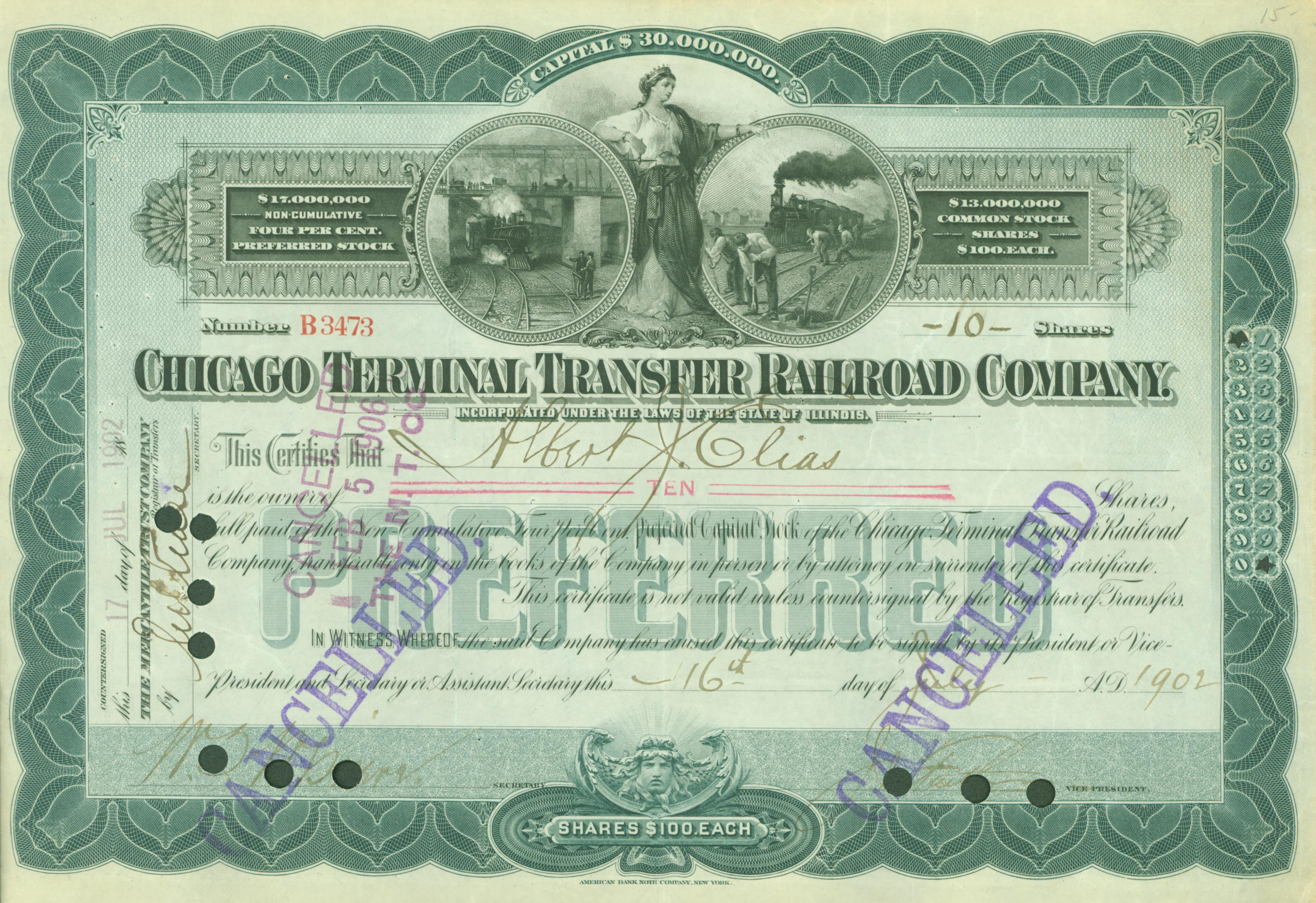
Preferred share of the Chicago Terminal Transfer Railroad Company, issued 16 July 1902.

In July 1897, a new company called the Chicago Terminal Transfer Railroad (CTT) bought the C&NP from the Wisconsin Central. While the WC (and successor Soo Line Railroad) no longer had its own direct connection to the city, it continued to use the line to access Grand Central Station until 1899, and between 1912 and 1965. In May 1897, the Chicago Terminal Transfer merged the Chicago & Calumet Terminal. The B&O began using Grand Central Station in 1892, when a connection was made between the CTT and the B&O at South Chicago. When the Pere Marquette Railroad was completed to Porter, Indiana in 1903, it also used the CTT into Grand Central Station.

On January 6, 1910, the Baltimore & Ohio Chicago Terminal Railroad was created to purchase the CTT at foreclosure, giving B&O control of both the terminal railway system, as well as Grand Central Station.

The railroad reached a peak size in the 1920s of 78 route-miles and 365 track-miles.

== Operations ==
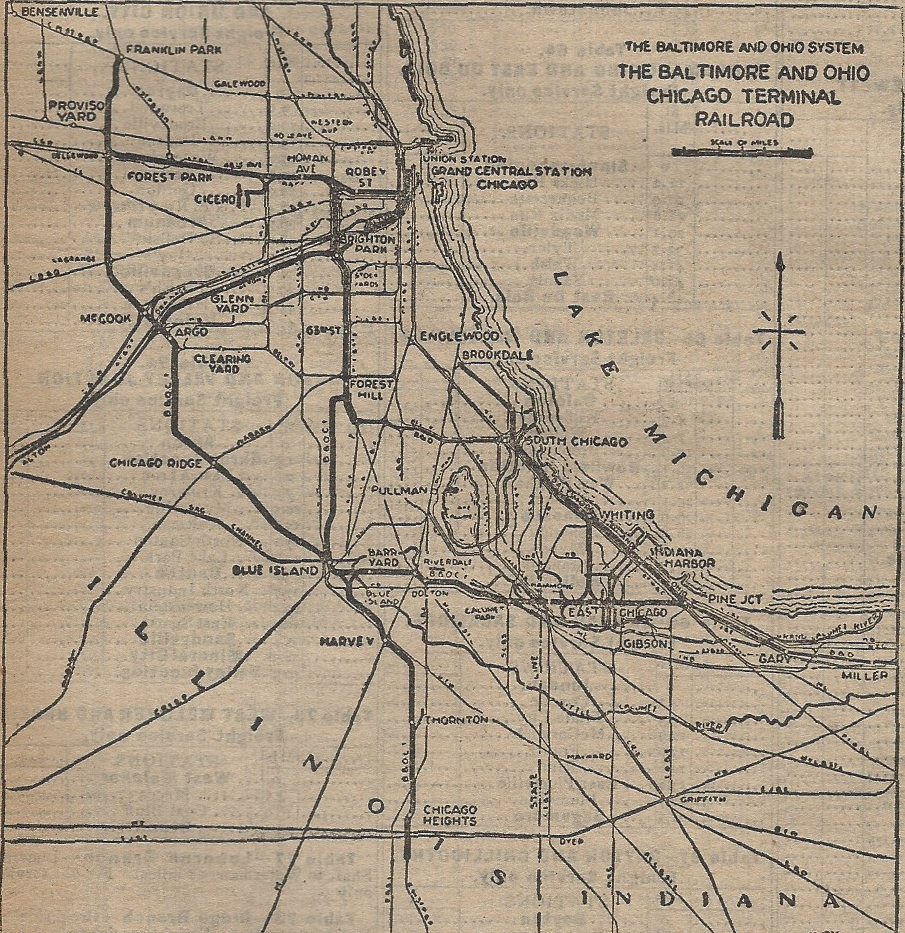
B&OCTRR map including locations of stations in addition to Grand Central Station. Trains from Indiana took a circuitous approach from the southeast to the downtown, veering west to Brighton Park, then east to toward Grand Central Station.

The railroad was strategically located in Chicago; connections made at Forest Park and trackage rights allowed the Minneapolis, St. Paul & Sault Ste. Marie Railway ("Soo Line") (which had leased the Wisconsin Central in 1909) and the Chicago Great Western Railway access to Grand Central Station.

=== Satellite stations ===
The Baltimore and Ohio had two long-distance train stations on the line, on the periphery of Chicago, as passing into the city border en route to Grand Central Station. The B&O's grand Capitol Limited and its other Chicago-bound trains stopped at the stations.

The B&O's South Chicago Station was located approximately at 94th Street and Commercial Avenue, slightly to the southwest of the Calumet River's opening to Lake Michigan. Additionally, the Pere Marquette Railway's Night Express to Muskegon and Grand Rapids, Michigan and its Resort Special to Bay View, Michigan, also used the B&OCT lines through the city, as well as the two stations on the approach to Grand Central Station. The B&O's 63rd Street Station, in the South Lynne section of the city was the company's other station within Chicago en route to Grand Central Station.

The Chesapeake and Ohio Railway absorbed the Pere Marquette in 1947 and continued its trains to southwest Michigan. These were the last trains to run through the two stations when passenger service passed over to Amtrak in 1971. The B&O trains stopped serving the South Chicago station between 1968 and 1970.
