= 1881 in rail transport =

This article lists events related to rail transport that occurred in 1881.

== Events ==
=== January events ===
- January 17 – Regular train service over the Prince of Wales Bridge on the Quebec, Montreal, Ottawa and Occidental Railway begins.

=== February events ===
- February 3 – The Seney Syndicate meets at Seney's New York bank and organized the New York, Chicago & St. Louis Railway Company (which would later become the Nickel Plate Road).
- February 16 – Canadian Pacific Railway incorporated.
- February 17 – The first train operates between Norwood, Ohio, and Lebanon, Ohio, on the Cincinnati Northern Railway.

=== March events ===
- March 1 – The Mexican Southern Railroad is incorporated with Ulysses S. Grant, former President of the United States, as its president.
- March 8 – The Atchison, Topeka and Santa Fe Railroad, building southwestward from Kansas, reaches Deming, New Mexico.

=== April events ===
- April 13 – The New York, Chicago & St. Louis Railway Company (later known as the Nickel Plate Road) purchases the Buffalo, Cleveland & Chicago Railway
- April 14 – The Oregon Short Line Railroad is established to build a rail connection between Granger, Wyoming, and Huntington, Oregon.

=== May events ===
- May 16 – The Gross-Lichterfelde Tramway, the world's first electric tramway, is opened in Berlin by Siemens & Halske.
- May 19 – Tracks of the Southern Pacific Railroad reach El Paso, Texas.
- May 28 – A. B. Rogers on his birthday discovers the pass through the Rocky Mountains that will bear his name, Rogers Pass.

=== June events ===
- June 9 – The Canada Central Railway is merged into the Canadian Pacific Railway.
- June 11 – The Atchison, Topeka and Santa Fe Railroad connects to El Paso, Texas.
- June 14 – Ephraim Shay takes out the first patent on his Shay locomotive design.

=== July events ===
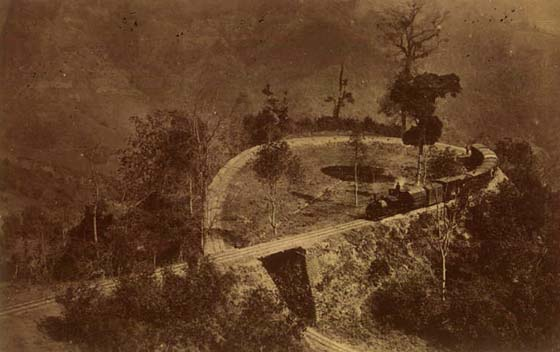
A tight loop (Agony Point) on the Darjeeling Himalayan Railway

- July 2 – Assassination of James A. Garfield: James A. Garfield, President of the United States, is shot by lawyer Charles J. Guiteau at the Baltimore and Potomac Railroad Station in Washington, D.C., dying on September 19 of a resultant infection.
- July 4 – Darjeeling Himalayan Railway opened throughout to Darjeeling, India.
- July 6 – Kate Shelley prevents a train with 200 passengers from going over the Honey Creek Bridge after it was washed out during a flash flood near Des Moines, Iowa.
- July 26 – Construction crews on the Denver, South Park and Pacific Railroad's Alpine Tunnel, in Colorado, break through to connect both ends of the tunnel.

=== August events ===
- August 15 – The International Exposition of Electricity opens in Paris, featuring the first tramway designed by Werner von Siemens. The installation was temporary, and removed after the Exposition closed on November 15.
- August 22 – The East Tennessee and Western North Carolina Railroad (ET&WNC) commences operation over a 14.1-mile (2.25-kilometer) run through the Appalachian Mountains.
- August 26 – The first train operates over the Red River Bridge into Winnipeg, Manitoba, Canada.

=== October events ===
- October 17 – First section of Royal Saxon State Railways narrow gauge railway (750 mm (2 ft 5 1/2 in) gauge) opens, between Wilkau and Kirchberg in the German Empire.
- October 20 – First section of Barbados Railway opens on 3 ft 6 in (1,067 mm) gauge between Bridgetown and Carrington.

=== Unknown date events ===
- E.W. Clark & Co., a private banking firm in Philadelphia, purchases the Atlantic, Mississippi and Ohio Railroad (a predecessor of the Norfolk & Western) at a foreclosure auction.
- The Richmond and Danville Railroad leases the Atlanta and Charlotte Air Line Railway.
- Henry Villard becomes president of the Northern Pacific Railroad.
- The French Compagnie Universelle du Canal Interocéanique purchases a controlling interest in the Panama Railway Company.
- John Souther retires from the steam locomotive manufacturing company that he founded, Globe Locomotive Works.
- The first standard gauge railroad in China is opened from Tangshan to Xugezhuang (10 km (6.2 mi)) for coal traffic.

== Births ==
=== March births ===
- March 22 – Arturo Caprotti, Italian inventor of Caprotti valve gear for steam locomotives (d. 1938).

=== July births ===
- July 8 – Mantis James Van Sweringen, American financier who, with his brother Oris, controlled the Nickel Plate Road and other eastern railroads (d. 1935).

=== October births ===
- October 30 – Charles E. Johnston, president of Kansas City Southern Railway 1928–1938 (d. 1951).

=== December births ===
- December 5 – Martin W. Clement, president of the Pennsylvania Railroad 1935–1948 (d. 1966).

== Deaths ==
=== May deaths ===
- May 21 – Thomas Alexander Scott, president of Union Pacific Railroad 1871–1872 (b. 1823).

=== October deaths ===
- October 30 – Matthias von Schönerer, Austrian railway engineer (b. 1807).

=== Unknown date deaths ===
- William S. Hudson, superintendent of American steam locomotive manufacturing firm Rogers, Ketchum and Grosvenor (b. 1810).
