= 1911 in rail transport =

This article lists events related to rail transport that occurred in 1911.

== Events ==
=== January ===
- January 22 – The Southern Railway introduces the Carolina Special between Cincinnati, Ohio and Charleston, South Carolina.
- January 23 – The Pontypridd railway accident in South Wales kills 11 people.

=== April ===
- April 22 – A passenger train from Port Alfred to Grahamstown in South Africa derails on the Blaauwkrantz Bridge and plunges into the ravine 200 feet (61 metres) below, killing 31 and seriously injuring 23.

=== May ===
- May 1 – Chūō Main Line, Nagoya to Shiojiri route officially completed and Nagoya to Nagano route direct passenger train service start in Japan.
- May 12 – Electric trains begin work between London Victoria station and Crystal Palace.
- May 28 – The Chicago, Milwaukee, St. Paul and Pacific Railroad ("Milwaukee Road") introduces the Olympian and Columbian passenger trains between Chicago and the Pacific Northwest. They are the first all-steel trains to operate in the Pacific Northwest.

=== June ===
- June 30 – First Great Western Railway 4300 Class 2-6-0 locomotive is turned out of its Swindon Works, England. The class, designed by George Jackson Churchward, will comprise 342 members and see overseas service during World War I.

=== July ===
- July 10 – Six construction workers die in an accident while working on the Western Maryland Railway's Salisbury Viaduct.
- July 11 – The Tinnos Line in Norway takes electric traction into use.
- July 25 – Canadian Northern Railway (CNOR) purchases the right-of-way and assets of the defunct Carillon and Grenville Railway, the last broad gauge railroad (at 5 ft 6 in (1,676 mm)) in North America, to become part of CNOR's Montreal-Ottawa mainline.

=== August ===
- August 17–21 – First national railway strike in the United Kingdom.

=== September ===
- September 1 – In what is called the "Great Merger", the Southern Pacific creates a new Pacific Electric Railway Company from several constituent railroads: the original "old" PE owned by Henry E. Huntington, The Los Angeles Inter-Urban Railway, The Los Angeles Pacific Railway, The Los Angeles and Redondo Railway, The San Bernardino Valley Traction Company, The San Bernardino Interurban, The Redlands Central, The Riverside and Arlington. Following these acquisitions, PE becomes the largest operator of interurban electric railway passenger service in the world, with 2,160 daily trains over 1,000 miles (1,600 km) of track.
- September 15 – Penn Station in Baltimore, Maryland opens.
- September 26 – Construction of the Usambara Railway in German East Africa reaches Moshi at Mount Kilimanjaro.
- September – First Great Central Railway Class 8K 2-8-0 freight locomotive, No. 966, is turned out of its Gorton locomotive works, England. The class, designed by John G. Robinson, will exceed 650 in total and see overseas service during World War I.

=== October ===
- October – Southern Railway 4501 is built by Baldwin Locomotive Works (serial number 37085).
- October 1
  - Hudson and Manhattan Railroad trains make their first station stops at the Pennsylvania Railroad's Manhattan Transfer station in New York City.
  - Nigel Gresley (later Sir Nigel) becomes Locomotive Engineer, Great Northern Railway.
  - Meitetsu Seto Line, Owari Seto to Horikawa of Nagoya route starts official regular operational service in Aichi Prefecture, Japan; it extends to Sakaemachi in 1978.
- October 4 – Regular operations over the entire Usambara Railway between Tanga and Moshi in German East Africa begins.
- October 5 – Kowloon–Canton Railway opens throughout.

=== November ===
- November 20 – Western Maryland Railway breaks ground for the station in Meyersdale, Pennsylvania.
- November 30 – The Rjukan Line in Norway takes electric traction into use.

=== December ===
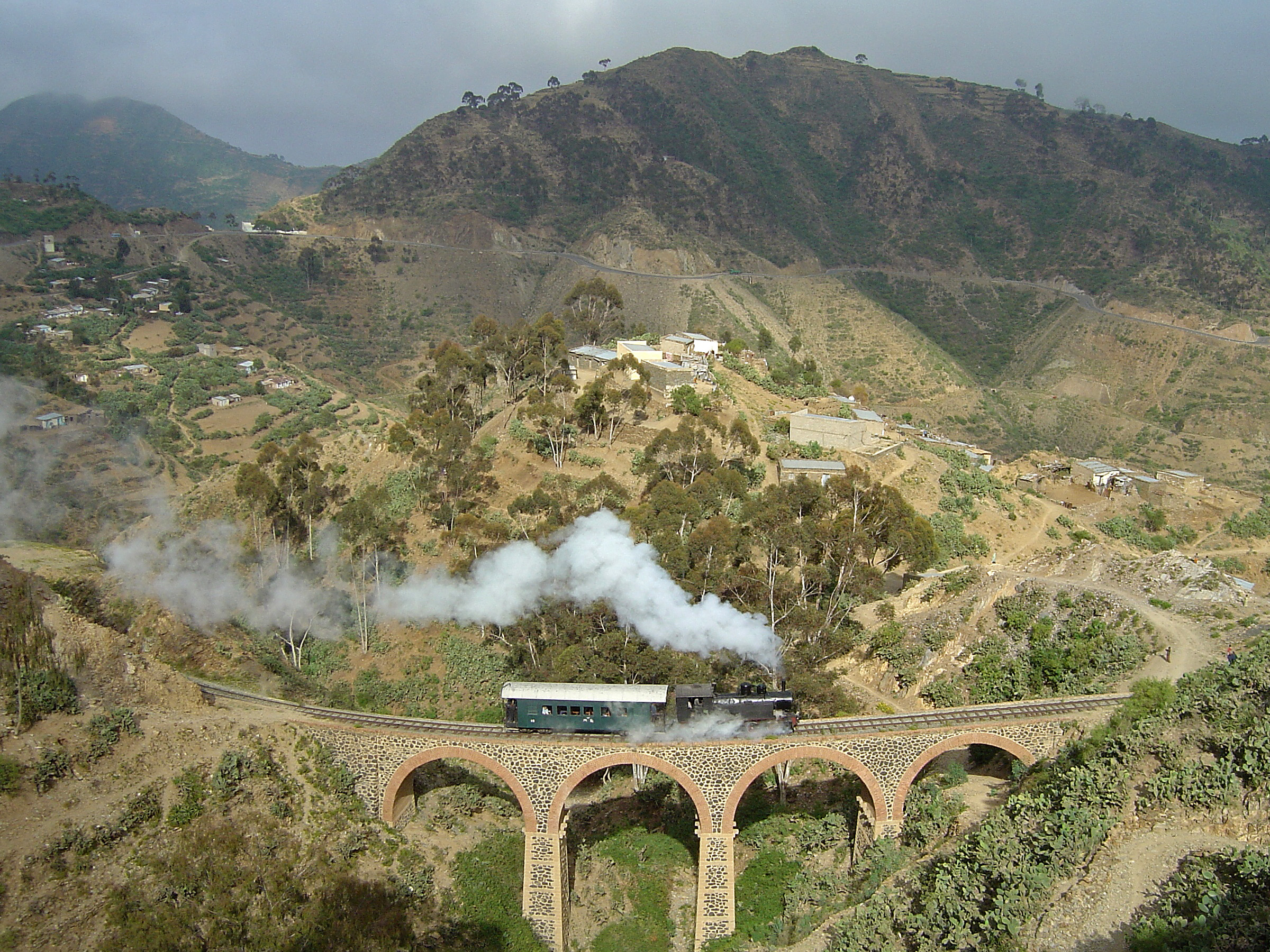
Eritrean Railway

- December 12 – Atchison, Topeka and Santa Fe Railway inaugurates its first extra-fare named passenger train, the Santa Fe De Luxe between Chicago, Illinois, and Los Angeles, California.
- December 24 – The Delaware, Lackawanna and Western Railroad opens the Lackawanna Cut-Off, a 28-mile low-grade line from Lake Hopatcong to the Delaware River. Built primarily to transport anthracite coal from Pennsylvania to New York, the line also serves dozens of resort hotels in the Pocono Mountains. Trains on this line routinely approach speeds of 100 miles an hour. It remains in service until 1979, being subsequently owned by the State of New Jersey. The Paulinskill Viaduct on the route is the world's largest reinforced concrete structure when completed in 1910 under the supervision of Lincoln Bush, the road's chief engineer.
- December 29 – Sudan Government Railways open to El Obeid.
- December – The Eritrean Railway (950 mm gauge) opens throughout from Massawa to Asmara, using Mallet locomotives.

=== Unknown date ===
- Chesapeake and Ohio Railway introduces the first 4-8-2 steam locomotives in the United States (built by the American Locomotive Company) onto its Mountain section.
- Rhaetian Railway Ge 2/2 electric locomotives introduced on the Berninabahn; they will still be in service on the line more than a century later.
- Atchison, Topeka and Santa Fe Railway introduces its 3000 class 2-10-10-2 locomotives.
- William Sproule succeeds Robert S. Lovett as president of the Southern Pacific Company, parent company of the Southern Pacific Railroad.
- The Manila Railroad Company opens the Manila a Baguio Especial, later the Baguio Special. Oriented towards luxury travelers heading for Baguio, it is the first express train in the Philippines and is the railroad's flagship service at this time.

== Deaths ==
=== March deaths ===
- March 18 – David Moffat, Colorado financier and head of nine railroads (b. 1839)
- March 30 – Thomas Whitelegg, locomotive superintendent for London, Tilbury and Southend Railway 1880–1910 (b. 1863)

=== September deaths ===
- September 12 – John Souther, founder of Globe Locomotive Works in Boston, Massachusetts (b. 1816)
