= Souther =

Souther may refer to:

- Souther (meteorology), a strong wind coming from the south

== People ==
- Calvin Souther Fuller (1902–1994), American physical chemist and co-inventor of the solar cell
- Jack Souther (1924–2014), American-Canadian geologist
- JD Souther (1945–2024), American singer and songwriter
- John Souther (1816–1911), founder of Globe Locomotive Works
  - Marguerite Souther (1882-1975) , dance educator, granddaughter of John Souther
- Michael Souther, Canadian television director, producer and writer
- Richard Souther (born 1951), American composer and instrumentalist

== Places ==
- Souther Fell, a mountainous landscape in the English Lake District
- Souther Field, an airport in Americus, Georgia Airport

== Other uses ==
- John Souther House, an historic house in Newton, Massachusetts, United States
- Souther, a character in the manga series Fist of the North Star

== See also ==
- Southers, a military group in the comic strip Rogue Trooper
- Erroll Southers, 2009 nominee to be chief Administrator of the United States Transportation Security Administration
