= Van Sweringen railroad holdings =

In addition to streetcar lines, the Van Sweringen Brothers of Cleveland, Ohio (known as "the Vans") owned a vast network of steam railroads.

== History ==
The New York Central Railroad had owned the closely parallel New York, Chicago and St. Louis Railroad since 1882, soon after its opening. Due to fears of prosecution under the 1914 Clayton Antitrust Act, the Central sold the line on July 5, 1915 to the newly formed Nickel Plate Securities Corporation, a holding company formed by the Vans. They were at first only interested in the line to provide a right-of-way for their Shaker Heights Rapid Transit to downtown Cleveland.

By 1920 the Vans had decided they wanted control of other railroads, including the Lehigh Valley Railroad, Delaware, Lackawanna and Western Railroad, Western Maryland Railway, Wheeling and Lake Erie Railway, Pittsburgh and West Virginia Railway, Pere Marquette Railway, Cincinnati Northern Railroad and Toledo, St. Louis and Western Railroad (Clover Leaf), as well as partial ownership in the Lake Erie and Western Railroad and Philadelphia and Reading Railway.

The Vaness Company was incorporated in Delaware on January 9, 1922 as a holding company to own all the other holding companies. The Clover Leaf Company was incorporated February 25 to own the Toledo, St. Louis and Western Railroad, and the Western Company March 11 for the Lake Erie and Western Railroad. The LE&W was bought for $3 million from the New York Central Railroad on April 26. On July 1, 1923 and LE&W and Clover Leaf were merged into the Nickel Plate.

For the next several years, the Vans bought up the stock of the Chesapeake and Ohio Railway (including its Hocking Valley Railway), the Pere Marquette Railway and the Erie Railroad. On August 20, 1924 they announced plans to merge the four companies into the New York, Chicago and St. Louis Railroad (Nickel Plate) to form a new New York, Chicago and St. Louis Railway. They applied to the Interstate Commerce Commission on February 21, 1925, but were denied on March 2, 1926 due to unsound financing. The plan was opposed by many C&O stockholders.

On February 3, 1927 the Vans, along with the New York Central Railroad (NYC) and Baltimore and Ohio Railroad, bought the Wheeling and Lake Erie Railway (W&LE). Four days later the Vans announced that they would make the C&O the centerpiece of their system, selling the Erie and Pere Marquette to them.

The Alleghany Corporation was incorporated January 26, 1929 in Maryland to hold the Vans' stock in the Nickel Plate, Chesapeake Corporation, Erie and C&O, as well as a partial ownership of the Buffalo, Rochester and Pittsburgh Railway (traded to the Baltimore and Ohio Railroad in March for the B&O's part of the W&LE; the Vans acquired the rest of it from the NYC at the same time). In April 1930 the Alleghany Corporation bought the Chicago and Eastern Illinois Railroad and 46% of the Missouri Pacific Railroad, gaining a majority of the MoPac on May 13. The Hocking Valley Railway merged into the C&O April 30, 1930.

Due to the Great Depression, the planned "Fourth System" failed. The new Midamerica Company bought most of the old assets on September 30, 1935 in an attempt to reorganize. The primary financial backer of the Midamerica Company was George A. Ball, the youngest of the Ball Brothers of Muncie, Indiana.

The Pere Marquette Railway merged into the Chesapeake and Ohio Railway (C&O) on June 6, 1947. The Nickel Plate leased the Wheeling and Lake Erie Railway on December 1, 1949, and on October 16, 1964 the Nickel Plate was merged into the Norfolk and Western Railway (N&W). The Erie merged into the Erie-Lackawanna Railroad (EL) on October 17, 1960. This left three pieces of the old system - part of the N&W, part of the EL, and the C&O. On August 31, 1965 the N&W and C&O announced a planned merger, with a holding company named Dereco to own the EL and several other lines. Dereco was incorporated March 1, 1968, acquiring the EL April 1. But the planned merger never happened. The C&O has since become part of CSX Transportation, the N&W part of the Norfolk Southern Railway (NS), and the EL part of Conrail, ownership of which is split between CSX and NS, in 1998 (at which time most of the former Erie went to NS).
