= Chicago Limited =

The Chicago Limited was the name of several named passenger trains in the United States:

- Chicago Limited (C&NW train), operated by the Chicago and North Western Transportation Company between Chicago and Duluth, Minnesota
- Chicago Limited (DLW train), operated by the Delaware, Lackawanna and Western Railroad between Hoboken, New Jersey and Chicago
- Chicago Limited (IC train), operated by the Illinois Central Railroad between Chicago and New Orleans, Louisiana
- Chicago Limited (Monon train), operated by the Monon Railroad between Chicago and Indianapolis, Indiana
- Chicago Limited (PRR train), operated by the Pennsylvania Railroad between Chicago and New York City
- Chicago Limited (PM train), operated by the Pere Marquette Railway between Chicago and Grand Rapids, Michigan

== See also ==
- List of named passenger trains of the United States (C)
