= 1816 in rail transport =

This article lists events related to rail transport that occurred in 1816.

== Events ==
- Richard Trevithick moves to Peru with the intention of designing and building steam locomotives for mining operations there.

== Births ==
=== January births ===
- January 3 – Samuel C. Pomeroy, president of the Atchison, Topeka and Santa Fe Railway 1863–1868 (d. 1891).

=== March births ===
- March 1 – John Souther, American steam locomotive manufacturer, founder of Globe Locomotive Works (d. 1911).

=== August births ===
- August 4 – Russell Sage, American financier, director of Union Pacific Railroad (d. 1906).
- August 6 – Thomas Russell Crampton, English engineer and designer of the Crampton locomotive type as well as a tunnel boring machine for the Channel Tunnel (d. 1888).
- August 24 – Daniel Gooch, Chief mechanical engineer of the Great Western Railway (England) (d. 1889).

=== October births ===
- October 8 – Aretas Blood, American steam locomotive manufacturer, owner of Manchester Locomotive Works (d. 1897).
