= NFTA Rail Maintenance Yard =

Maintenance facility for the Buffalo Metro Rail and former intermodal facility

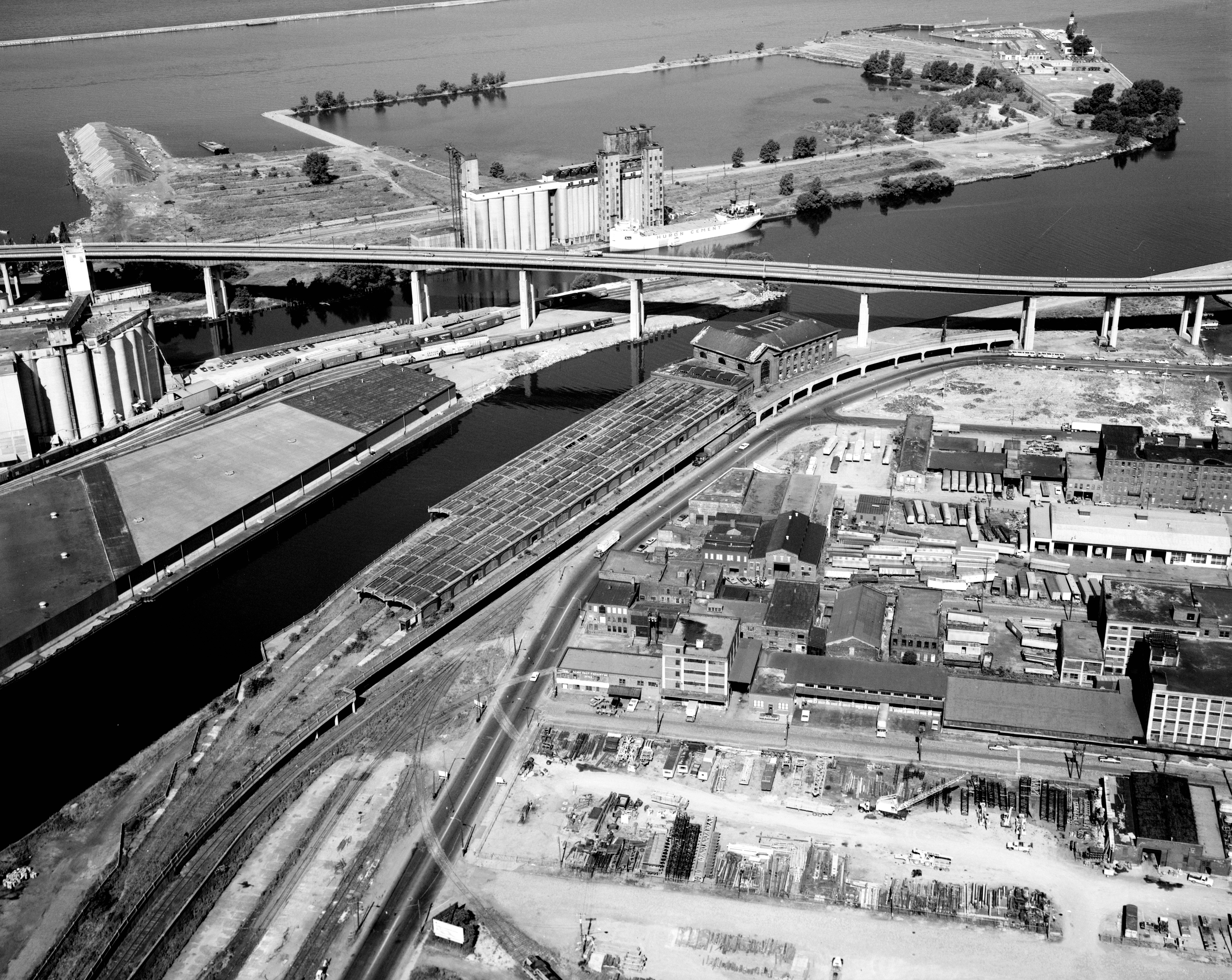
- 1971 view of DL&W Terminal, before its main building was demolished.

General information
- Location: 29 South Park Avenue; Buffalo, New York
- Coordinates: 42°52′22″N 78°52′27″W
- System: Car Barn, Maintenance Facility and Administration
- Owner: Niagara Frontier Transportation Authority
- Line: Buffalo Metro Rail
- Tracks: 5

Construction
- Platform levels: 2
- Parking: Employees only

History
- Opened: 1917 (DL&W); 1985 (NFTA)
- Rebuilt: 1982
- Former names: Delaware, Lackawanna and Western Terminal
Former services
Preceding station	Baltimore and Ohio Railroad	Following station
Lackawanna toward Pittsburgh	Buffalo, Rochester and Pittsburgh Railway	Terminus
Preceding station	Delaware, Lackawanna and Western Railroad	Following station
Terminus	Main Line	Leicester toward Hoboken
Terminus	Main Line	East Buffalo toward Hoboken
Preceding station	Nickel Plate Road	Following station
Dunkirk toward Chicago	Main Line	Terminus
Preceding station	Wabash Railroad	Following station
North Tonawanda toward Chicago	Chicago – Buffalo	Terminus
Location

The Metro Rail Maintenance Yard or "South Park Terminal" houses Buffalo Metro Rail's cars in a train shed at the former Delaware, Lackawanna and Western Railroad terminal in the Cobblestone District of Buffalo, New York. The property is located at the southernmost fringe of the Central Business District. The station was built in 1917, and was designed to handle both steam trains and steamships. The storage and maintenance facility was converted to its present condition in 1982, following the demolition of the former main terminal concourse building "headhouse" of the DL&W Terminal in 1979.

The lower level of the sheds are used to store the rail cars when they are not in use. The upper level is mostly empty space, consisting of the concrete troughs where tracks once stood and their platforms. However, some of it is used for offices, a train operators' lounge and storage.

Numerous proposals for adaptive reuse of the unused portion of the upper level of the terminal sheds have been floated publicly by various parties, including: a casino, a farmers market and loft apartments, while the lower floor underwent reconstruction to accommodate a new Metro Rail station in 2025.

In 1982, an addition was built on the east end of the terminal building, which has a modern rail maintenance shop for servicing the rail fleet. This addition also contains some administrative offices.

== History ==
The terminal was built by the Delaware, Lackawanna and Western Railroad in 1917. The station served as a de facto union station, as several railroad companies used the terminal as a passenger station: the Buffalo, Rochester & Pittsburgh Railway (acquired by Baltimore & Ohio in 1932), Pere Marquette Railway (however, its passenger trains ceased reaching the terminal by 1932), the New York, Chicago and St. Louis Railroad ("Nickel Plate Road"), and the Wabash Railroad.

The station was built for both boat and rail travel. Passengers arriving by boat entered the station from the south side entrance which faced the Buffalo River. The building was three stories high and built of brownstone. There were waiting rooms on the ground floor and on the second floor which were connected by a grand double staircase. The ground floor had one ticket office and checking counter with benches along the sides. The second waiting room was fitted with accommodations for about 200 persons.

Off the waiting room was a women's parlor, furnished in soft brown with wicker furniture. There were rugs on the floor and a writing desk. On the other side of the stairs was a smoking room. The middle of the east side of the waiting room had the entrance to the train concourse. Also next to the waiting room was a newsstand, telegraph and parcel booths, and restaurant. On a mezzanine floor were the rooms for railroad employees, a waiting room for immigrants, and a room for railroad business mail. On the third floor were various offices, including those for the superintendent and the train dispatcher.

The construction of the Buffalo Skyway led to the demolition of the line north of the terminal where the skyway was placed.

In 1960, the Delaware, Lackawanna and Western Railroad merged with the Erie Railroad. The new resulting railroad known as the Erie Lackawanna Railroad or the "EL".

== Passenger service ==
Lackawanna Terminal hosted trains of its owner Delaware, Lackawanna & Western, as well as The Nickel Plate named night trains to Buffalo afforded the continuation of trips to the DLW's Hoboken Terminal via DLW trains. Briefly, from the Nickel Plate's 1964 merger into the Norfolk & Western until the trains' termination in 1965, these trains were carried under the Norfolk & Western name. Into the 1930s, the Wabash Railroad had Chicago to New York service in similar fashion: the Wabash operating trains from Chicago and Detroit to Buffalo (Wabash #6 eastbound, through Southwestern Ontario, connecting at Buffalo with the DLW's the Chicago and New York Express, and westbound the DLW's Chicago Limited connecting at Lackawanna Terminal with Wabash #1-11 through Southwestern Ontario to Lackawanna Terminal); then, DLW trains completing the trip from Buffalo to Hoboken. The B&O operated both day and nighttime trains on the BR&P line to Pittsburgh via East Salamanca and DuBois. 1955 was the final year for B&O service to Pittsburgh.

Passenger service in 1964:

- Erie Lackawanna:
  - New York Mail (eastbound only night train, Buffalo-Hoboken)
  - Owl (westbound only night train, Hoboken-Buffalo)
  - Phoebe Snow (Buffalo-Hoboken)
- Norfolk & Western:
  - City of Chicago (westbound only night train, Buffalo-Chicago, picking up carriages from Phoebe Snow for continuous Hoboken-Chicago trip) / City of Cleveland (eastbound only night train, Chicago-Buffalo, connecting with the New York Mail for continuing to Hoboken)

The EL abandoned the terminal soon after when, in 1968, it ended the overnight Owl service from Hoboken to Buffalo and New York Mail heading back. After years of abandonment, the head house of the terminal was demolished in 1979 in preparation for the installation of the Buffalo Metro Rail.

== DL&W station ==
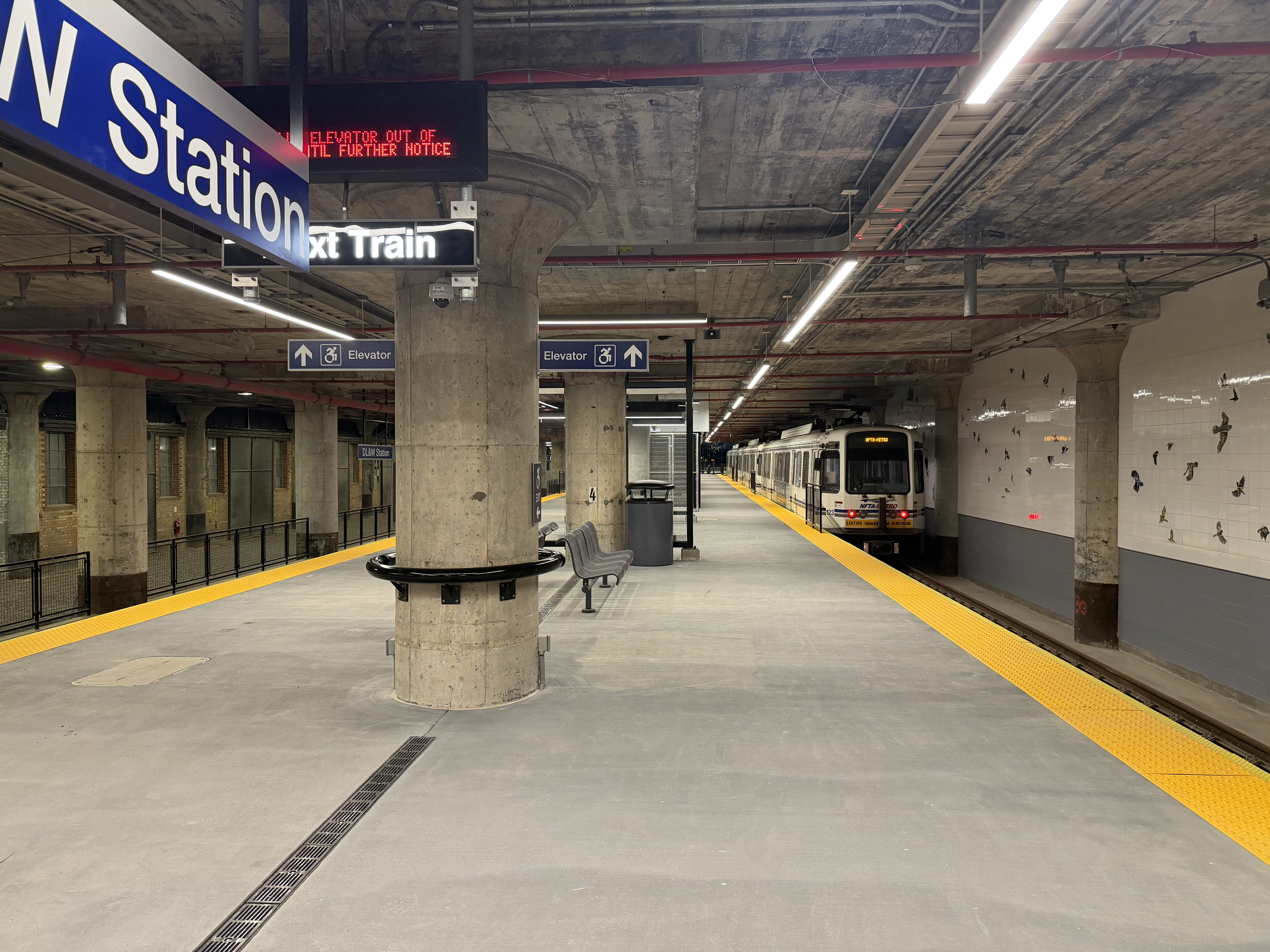
DL&W Station in 2025

With the redevelopment around the terminal of Canalside, LECOM Harborcenter, and KeyBank Center, work is underway to redevelop the building into a multi-modal site, turning the upper level of the building into commercial space with a pedestrian bridge to KeyBank Center and its parking garage as well as a new Metro Rail station inside the building on the lower level, with public access to Riverwalk. The plan, estimated to cost $42 million and later approved by NFTA, also includes docks on the Buffalo River. On December 8, 2025, the Metro Rail station opened.
