= Erie Limited =

Erie Limited Erie-Lackawanna Limited
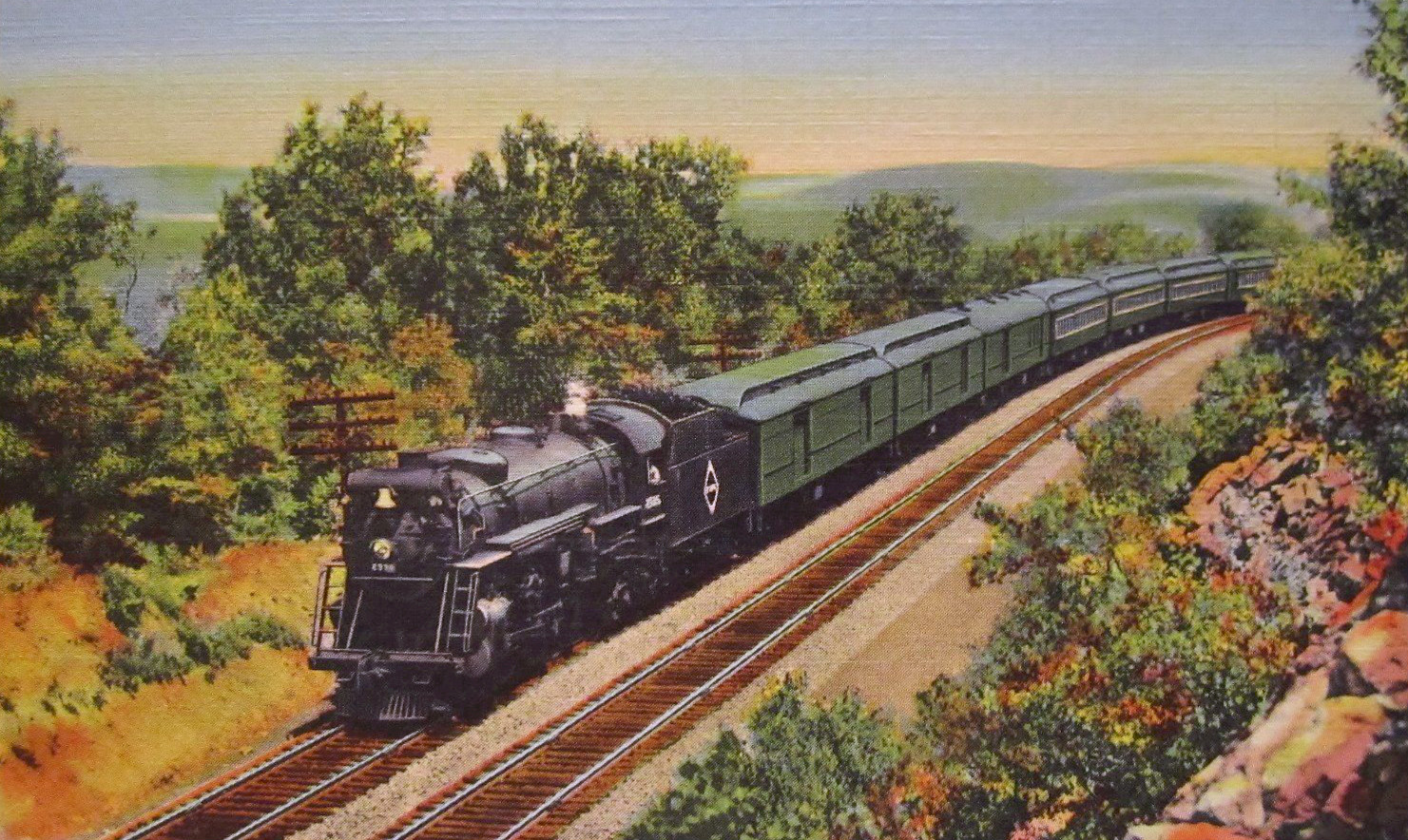
- The Erie Limited near Port Jervis, New York

Overview
- Service type: Inter-city rail
- Status: discontinued
- Locale: Midwestern United States/Northeastern United States
- Predecessor: Southern Tier Express
- First service: June 2, 1929
- Last service: October 27, 1963
- Successor: Phoebe Snow
- Former operators: Erie Railroad; Erie Lackawanna Railway

Route
- Termini: Jersey City, New Jersey until 1956; Hoboken, New Jersey afterwards Chicago, Illinois
- Distance travelled: 998.7 miles (1,607.3 km) [1954]
- Service frequency: Daily
- Train numbers: 1 westbound; 2 eastbound

The Erie Limited was a streamlined passenger train operated by the Erie Railroad between Jersey City, New Jersey (for New York City) and Chicago, Illinois via the Southern Tier. It operated from 1929 to 1963. After the merger of the Erie and the Delaware, Lackawanna and Western Railroad (DL&W) in 1960 it was known as the Erie-Lackawanna Limited. Once the premier passenger train on the Erie, repeated service reductions in the 1950s and 1960s left it a shell of its former self. The Phoebe Snow replaced it in 1963.

== History ==
The Erie Limited debuted on June 2, 1929, replacing the Southern Tier Express, which had run between Jersey City and Buffalo, New York. The new service joined two other Jersey City–Chicago trains: the Atlantic Express/Pacific Express and Chicago Express/New York Express. The train included a Buffalo section with parlor and buffet service which split at Hornell, New York.

The primary competitors to the Erie Limited were the New York Central Railroad's 20th Century Limited and the Pennsylvania Railroad's Broadway Limited. Both trains were well-established on the New York–Chicago run and enjoyed several advantages over the Erie Limited: direct access to Manhattan, faster running times (16 hours versus 24), and more luxurious accommodations. The Erie eschewed competition on these fronts and scheduled the Erie Limited for a morning departure from Jersey City so that it traversed the "spectacular..Delaware and Susquehanna river valleys" in daylight.

Erie began offering packaged tours in the early 1930s as the Great Depression curtailed patronage. One such was the "3-way tours" announced in 1930, which involved a combination of bus, train, and steamship travel. The Erie offered a "Six Day All Expense Personally Conducted" tour for US$85, originating from Pavonia Terminal in Jersey City, which included a tour of the Finger Lakes area, a steamship journey to Alexandria Bay, New York in the Thousand Islands, a tour of Toronto, and trip across Niagara Falls via the Great Gorge Route. The Erie later expanded these tours to "4-way", adding air travel to the mix. Passengers would take the Chicago Express to Cleveland, Ohio, fly to Detroit, Michigan, take a steamship to Buffalo, New York, tour Niagara Falls, then return to New York on the Erie Limited. All this still in six days, and at "moderate" price.

The Erie discontinued the Buffalo section on February 12, 1951. The train continued running after the Erie's 1960 merger with the Delaware, Lackawanna and Western Railroad, but was renamed the Erie-Lackawanna Limited in January 1961. The train was re-routed over the Lackwanna's line between Hoboken and Binghamton and combined with the Phoebe Snow between Hoboken and Elmira. This change, carried out on April 30, 1961, proved short-lived. The Erie Lackawanna dropped the Phoebe Snow name on October 28, 1962, and put the Erie-Lackawanna Limited back on the ex-Erie route. By 1963 sleeping cars ran between Chicago and Binghamton only, although coaches continued to run through to the East Coast.

Cutbacks continued through 1963: sleeping car service now ended at Hornell, while the diner-lounge ran between Hoboken and Youngstown, Ohio. The final blow came with the arrival of a new president of the Erie Lackawanna, William H. White. Although favorably disposed to passenger service, White had served as president of the Lackawanna from 1941–1952. White upgraded the Erie-Lackawanna Limited with a tavern-lounge car and restored through sleeping car service, but he also ordered it renamed the Phoebe Snow, effective October 27, 1963.

== Equipment ==
Sample consist
June 2, 1947
- Location: Jamestown, New York
- Train: Westbound No. 1
- 4-6-2 No. 2935; No. 575 baggage-express; No. 529 baggage-express; No. 609 baggage-mail; No. 1008 coach; No. 2205 coach; No. 2256 coach; No. 946 diner-lounge; Scenic Island sleeping car (10 sections, 1 drawing room, 2 double bedrooms); American Life sleeping car (6 sections, 6 roomettes, 4 double bedrooms); Telos sleeping car (12 sections, 1 drawing room)

In its original incarnation the Erie Limited had Pullman sleeping cars, coaches, a dining car, and a club-lounge. All the equipment was heavyweight. The Erie acquired four American series sleeping cars from Pullman-Standard in 1942. These lightweight cars had six sections, six roomettes, and four double bedrooms. One ran on each train. After World War II the Erie acquired seven more lightweight sleepers from Pullman-Standard, each with ten roomettes and six double bedrooms. The Erie Limited was assigned three of the sleepers: one in each direction between New York and Chicago, and one on the westbound Erie Limited between Akron and Chicago which returned on the Atlantic Express.

== Route ==
The Erie Limited used the Erie's main line between the Pavonia Terminal in Jersey City and Chicago's Dearborn Station. From Jersey City passengers traveled to Manhattan via bus or the Pavonia Ferry. Major stops included Binghamton, New York and Akron, Ohio (Union Station). In 1956 the eastern terminal shifted to the DL&W's Hoboken Terminal. For a short period in 1961–1963 the train used the ex-Lackawanna line between Hoboken and Binghamton.
