= Nickel Plate Limited =

Overview
- Service type: Inter-city rail
- Status: Discontinued
- Locale: Northeastern United States; Midwestern United States
- First service: 1929
- Last service: 1954
- Successor: City of Chicago (westbound) / City of Cleveland (eastbound)
- Former operator(s): Nickel Plate Road; Norfolk & Western, 1964-1965

Route
- Termini: Chicago, Illinois; Hoboken, New Jersey; for Buffalo-Hoboken segment: via Delaware, Lackawanna & Western trains
- Distance travelled: 523.8 miles (843.0 km) Chicago-Buffalo; 919.0 miles (1,479.0 km) Chicago-Hoboken
- Service frequency: Daily
- Train number(s): 5 westbound, 6 eastbound

On-board services
- Seating arrangements: Coaches
- Sleeping arrangements: Sections, Roomettes, Double Bedrooms, Single Bedrooms, Drawing Room (1950)
- Catering facilities: Diner lounge

Technical
- Track gauge: 4 ft 8 1/2 in (1,435 mm)

The Nickel Plate Limited, later known as the City of Cleveland and City of Chicago, was a passenger night train operated by the New York, Chicago and St. Louis Railroad (Nickel Plate) between Chicago and Buffalo, New York via Cleveland, Ohio, with through service to Hoboken, New Jersey (for New York City) via Binghamton and Scranton and the Delaware, Lackawanna and Western Railroad for the Buffalo-Hoboken segment.

The Nickel Plate bestowed the name Nickel Plate Limited on an existing (unnamed) Chicago-New York service in April 1929. It was the first named Nickel Plate train since 1906. The Nickel Plate also added Pullman club cars and sleepers to compete with New York Central Railroad service (such as the Forest City) over the same route. The DL&W's New York Mail handled eastbound through cars between Buffalo and New York while the Phoebe Snow (before 1949, the Lackawanna Limited) handled cars westbound. Into the train's later years, it would offer the range of sleeper accommodations, from the open sections to the modern roomettes to a drawing room. The Nickel Plate trains would link with the DLW trains at Lackawanna Station in Buffalo.

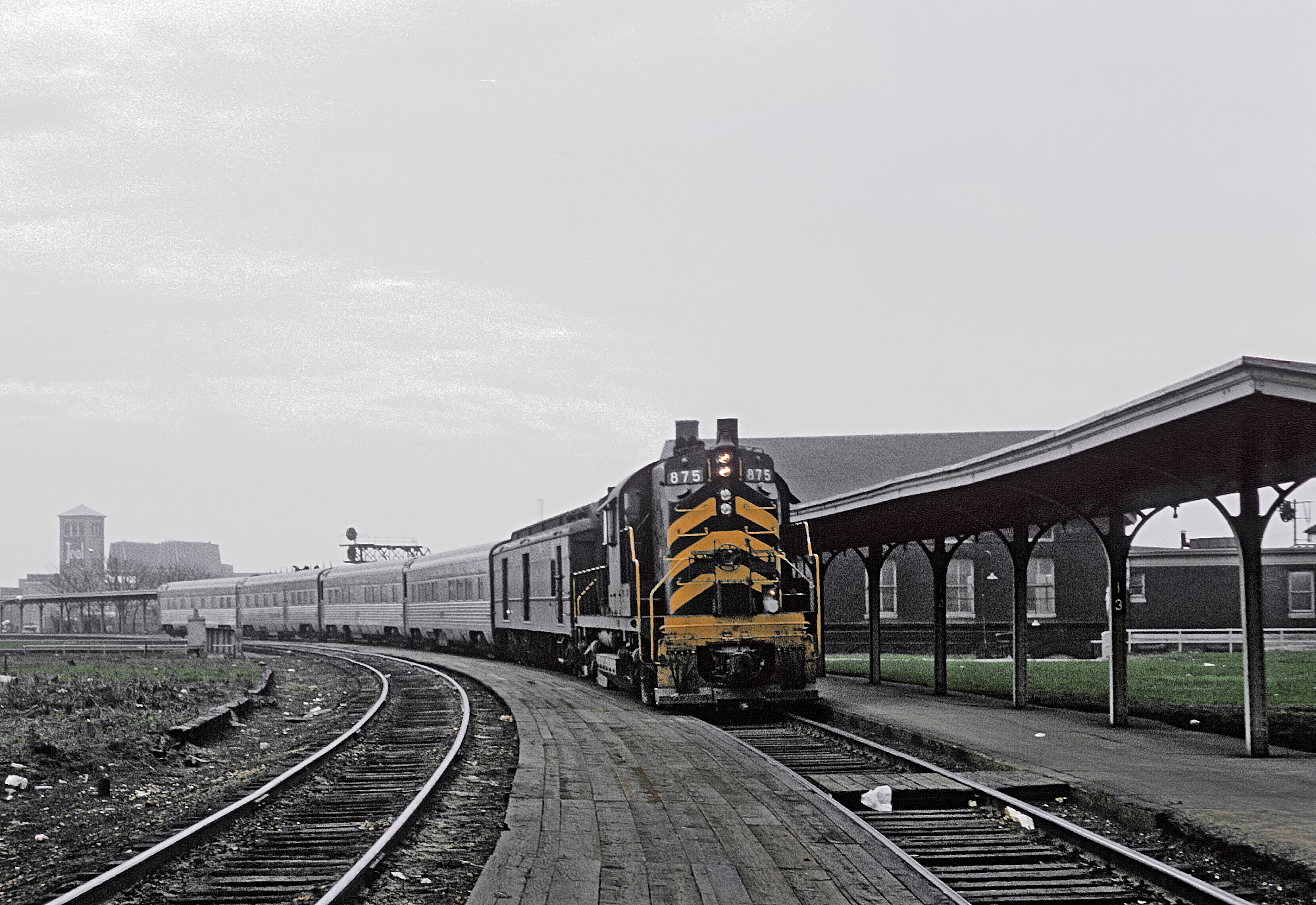
Successor Train 5, The City of Chicago at Englewood Union Station, on Chicago's South Side, on April 21, 1965

In 1954 the Nickel Plate renamed the train: the westbound train became the City of Chicago while the eastbound train became the City of Cleveland. Through service to Hoboken ended in 1959. Both trains survived the Nickel Plate itself: service ended on September 10, 1965, a year after the Nickel Plate's 1964 merger with the Norfolk and Western Railway. They were the final remnants of the Nickel Plate's passenger service.

== Major stops ==
The following are major station stops en route:

- Chicago (La Salle Street)
- Englewood
- Fort Wayne
- Lorain
- Cleveland (Union Terminal)
- Erie
- Buffalo (Lackawanna Terminal)
