= Phoebe Snow (train) =

American passenger train (1949–1966)

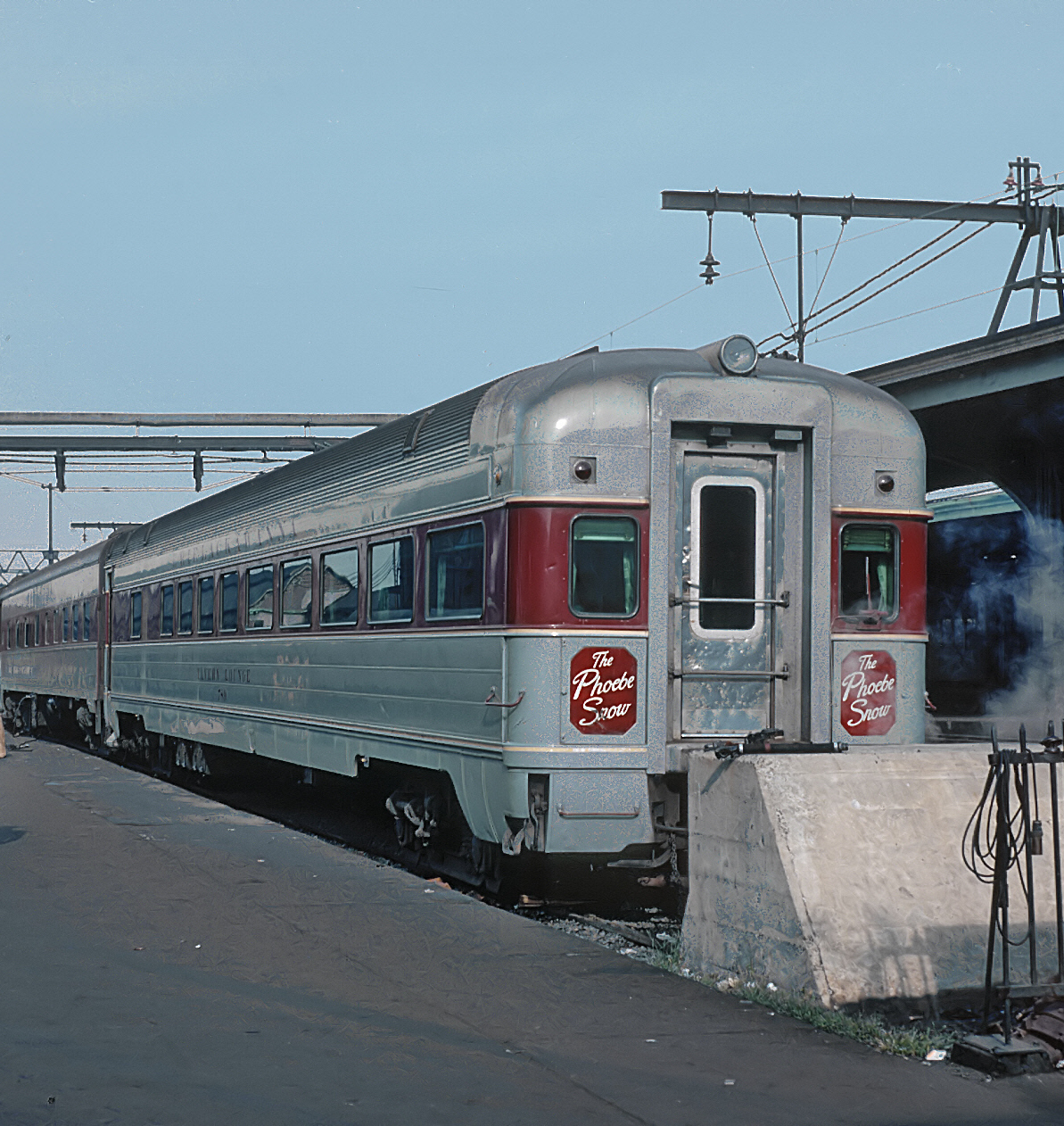
- The Phoebe Snow at Hoboken Terminal in 1965

Overview
- Service type: Inter-city rail
- Status: Discontinued
- Locale: New Jersey; Pennsylvania; New York
- Predecessor: Lackawanna Limited
- First service: November 15, 1949 (DL&W); 1963 (EL)
- Last service: November 27, 1966
- Former operators: Delaware, Lackawanna and Western Railroad (DL&W); Erie Lackawanna Railway (EL)

Route
- Termini: Hoboken, New Jersey; Buffalo, New York; Other years: Chicago
- Distance travelled: 396 miles (637 km)
- Average journey time: 8 hours
- Service frequency: Daily
- Train numbers: 1-31 (westbound), 2-32 (eastbound) (1963)

On-board services
- Seating arrangements: coaches
- Sleeping arrangements: Roomettes and Double Bedrooms (when operating to Chicago)
- Catering facilities: diner-lounge

Technical
- Rolling stock: F3, E8A (locomotives); Tavern-Lounge (passenger)
- Track gauge: 1,435 mm (4 ft 8 1/2 in)

Phoebe Snow was a named passenger train which was once operated by the Delaware, Lackawanna and Western Railroad (DL&W) and, after a brief hiatus, the Erie Lackawanna Railway (EL). It ran between 1949 and 1966, primarily connecting Buffalo, New York and Hoboken, New Jersey.

== History ==
=== Lackawanna Limited ===
Around 1900, the DL&W launched a marketing campaign around the fictional character of Phoebe Snow to emphasize how the exhaust from its steam locomotives was cleaner than competitors' locomotives, as a result of using anthracite coal. The train took its name from the character.

Its route traveled across New Jersey, passing over the Paulinskill Viaduct and the Delaware River Viaduct of the Lackawanna Cut-off; Pennsylvania, passing over the Tunkhannock Viaduct; and the Southern Tier region of New York.

The Lackawanna Limited was known for its fast time as well as the scenery of the route. It included a Pullman full vestibule parlor car, sleeping car, dining car and coaches. Running during daylight hours, scenery included the Delaware Water Gap, Pocono Mountains and the Susquehanna and Genesee River valleys. The fast train stopped only at principal cities.

On August 30, 1943, the Lackawanna Limited wrecked in Wayland, New York, when it sideswiped a local freight that had not cleared into a siding, killing 29 and injuring more than 100.

=== DL&W era (1949–60) ===
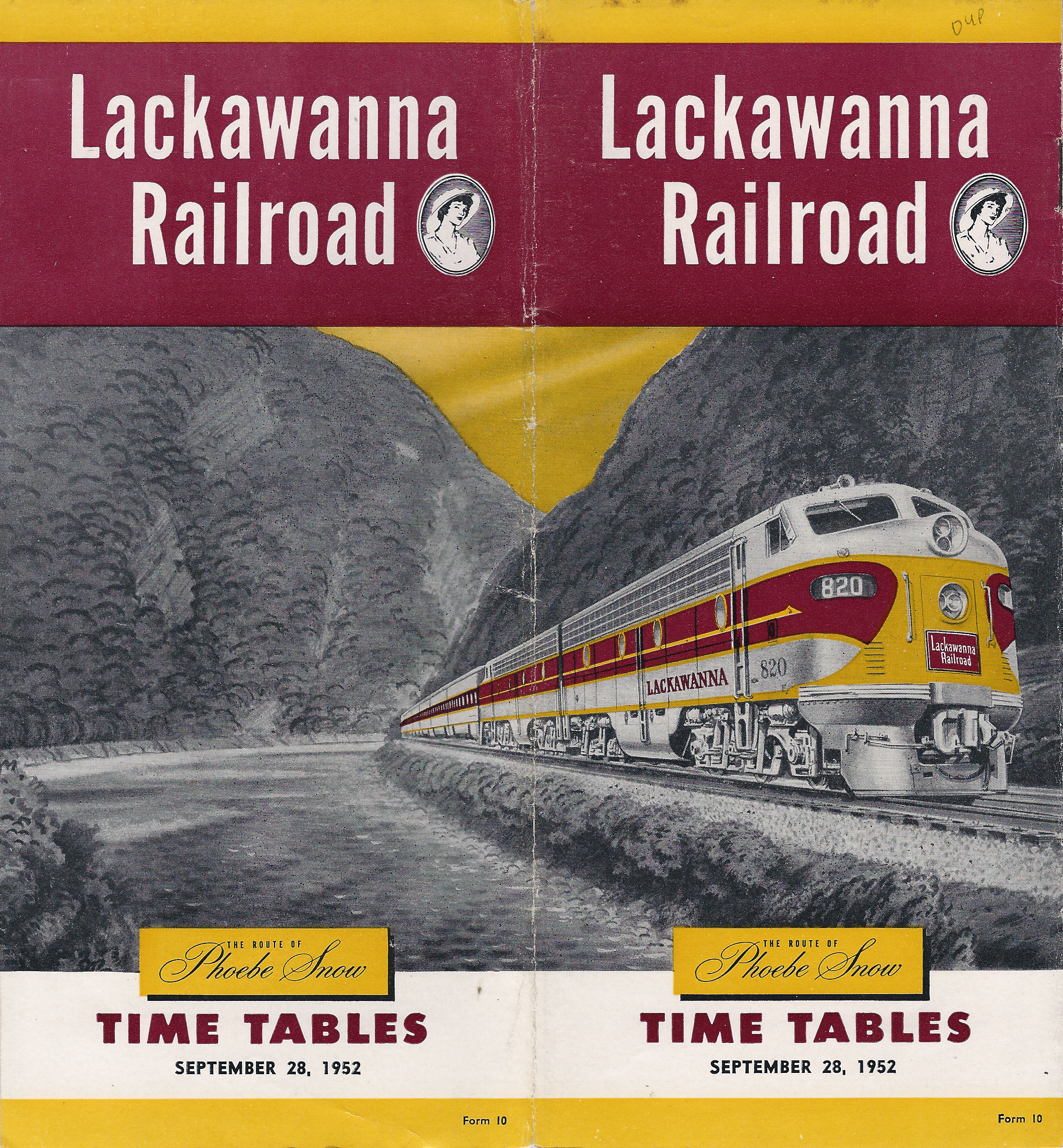
Lackawanna Railroad Form 10 passenger schedules showing DL&W diesel equipment and a motto: "The Route of Phoebe Snow"

On November 15, 1949, the DL&W inaugurated a new streamlined passenger train named after its long-dormant promotional symbol. Launched by DL&W president William White, the new Phoebe Snow represented the DL&W's modernization of its passenger train fleet and image, as it became Train No. 3 (westbound) and No. 6 (eastbound), which previously had been assigned to the railroad's former premier train, the Lackawanna Limited. The Phoebe Snow ran on a daylight schedule between Hoboken, New Jersey (Hoboken Terminal), and Buffalo, New York (Lackawanna Station), making the 396-mile (637 km) trip in about eight hours. Westbound, after Buffalo, the sleepers and some coaches continued to Chicago, Illinois, over the Nickel Plate Railroad's Nickel Plate Limited and on return were transferred in Buffalo to Train No. 10, the New York Mail.

The train's reclining-seat coaches were taken from a pool of 26 cars split between builders Pullman-Standard and American Car & Foundry (ACF). The dining cars and tavern-lounge-observation cars for the two Phoebe Snow consists were built by the Budd Company, while the through sleeping car in each consist was taken from a pool of nine 10-roomette, 6-double bedroom cars built for the Lackawanna by ACF. Motive power was provided initially by an A-B-A set of passenger-equipped EMD F3 diesels, but their steam generators provided insufficient heat to the train in winter, and were supplanted by a pair of EMD E8A diesel-electric locomotives.

In 1958, as part of the consolidation of operations between the Erie and DL&W railroads—the roads would merge formally in 1960 to form the EL—DL&W's mainline between Binghamton and Corning, New York, was severed and all trains traveling between those points were rerouted over the Erie mainline. Between April 29 and July 1, 1962, all passenger trains between Corning and Buffalo were re-routed off the DL&W mainline over Dansville Hill to the former Erie mainline via Hornell, New York: a route that was 4 miles (6.4 km) longer than the old one and added an hour to the scheduled time.

=== EL era (1963–66) ===
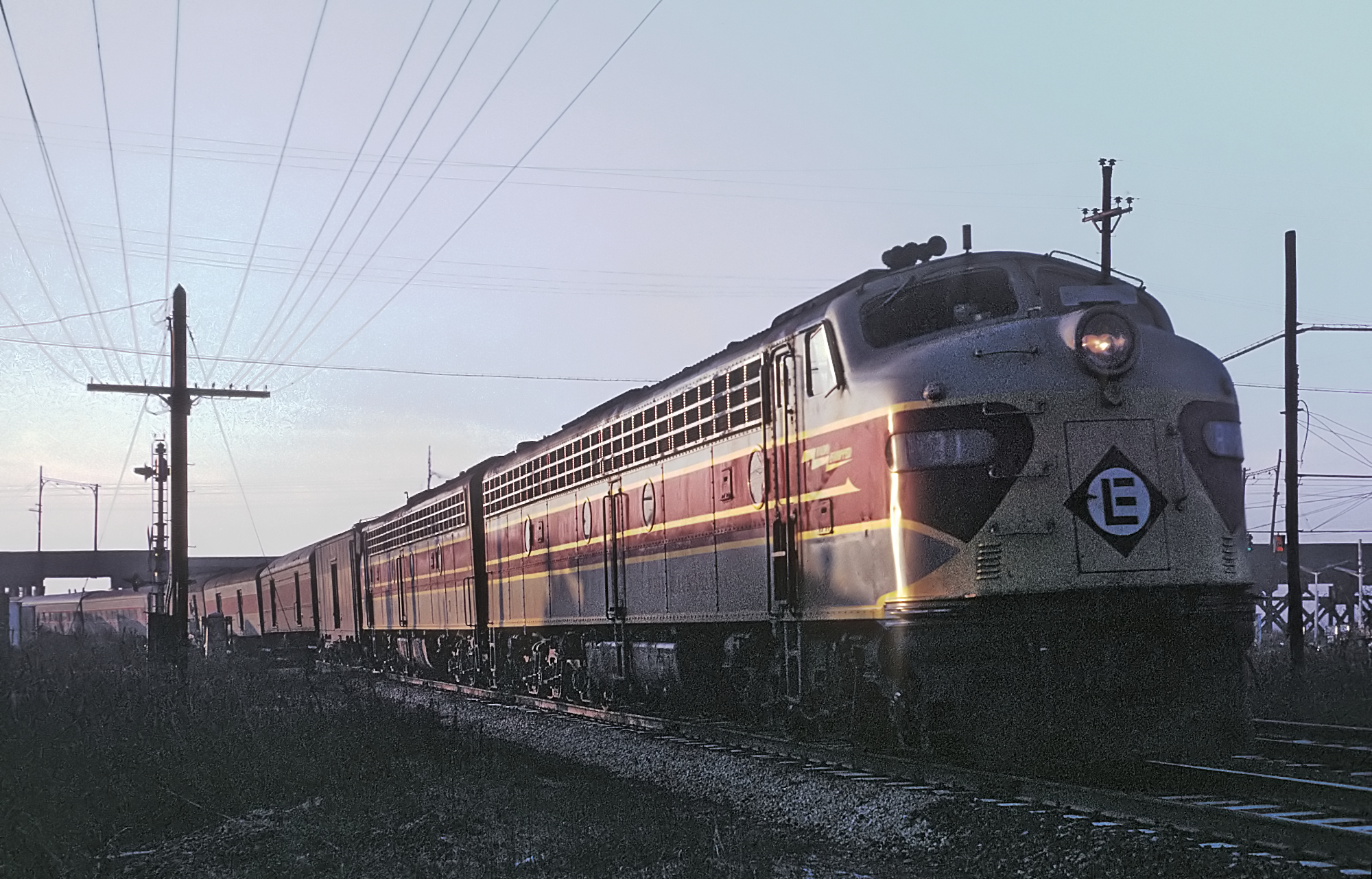
One of the last Phoebe Snows departing Chicago at 130th St. And Torrence Ave. on November 25, 1966

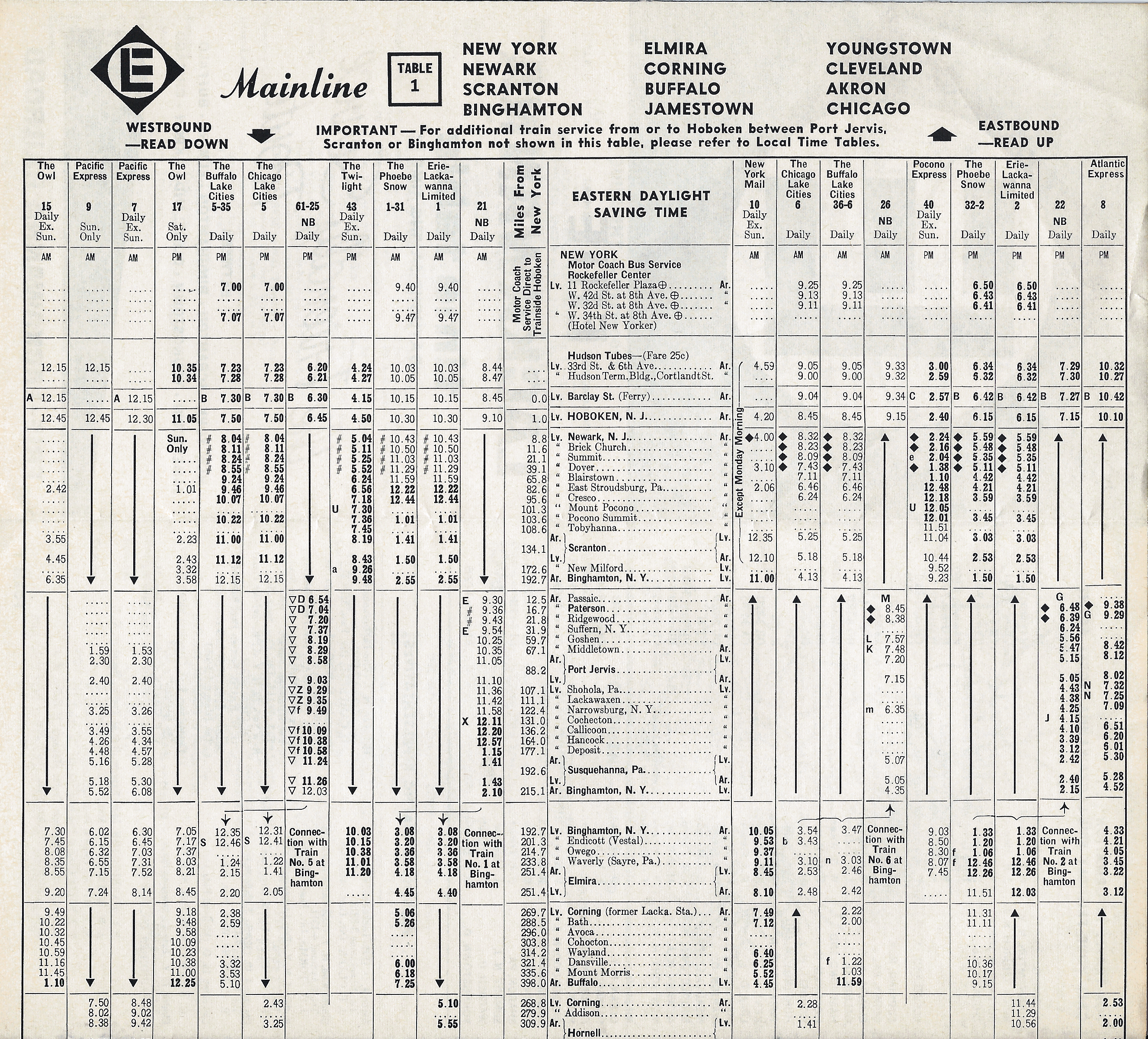
Erie Lackawanna Railroad Company Main Line Timetable showing such famous trains as Phoebe Snow, Lake Cities, and Erie Lackawanna Limited

After the EL merger, the Phoebe Snow continued to run as #3. However, since the signature tavern-lounge cars (combination observation cars and bar cars), with the Phoebe Snow drumheads on their tail ends, were so closely identified with the train that, when these cars were taken off the train and placed into storage shortly after the merger, many observers were led to believe that the train had been discontinued. This was not true. The train continued to run, albeit without the cars that arguably defined it and with a new name: Erie Lackawanna Limited (a merger renaming of the Erie Limited). Reportedly, the cars had been placed into storage in the unused Erie shop facilities at Susquehanna, Pennsylvania because they were deemed a nuisance, as they had to be turned on a turntable or a wye at the end of each trip. An alternative explanation for the discontinuation of the cars was that the Erie management resented the symbol of the DL&W playing such a prominent a role in the EL passenger train operation and sought to dispose of it wherever they could. However, it was equally true that the observation cars' bar facilities lacked the ability to provide proper food service, unlike the EL's dining-lounge cars, which could serve both meals and beverages as well as provide distinct seating for each type of service.

Whatever the reason, the observation cars were restored after William White was appointed EL president on June 18, 1963. The originator of the Phoebe Snow ordered the train reborn as train #1, replacing the short-lived Erie-Lackawanna Limited. White was looking for a way to boost both EL employee morale and to gain some positive publicity for the foundering railroad; the move accomplished both. However, since a Hoboken-Chicago routing was chosen, which bypassed Buffalo, the train was put into direct competition with the New York Central Railroad's passenger operation. In an earlier time, the new train might have flourished, but with the steadily declining image of passenger rail travel in the U.S. in general, and competition from airlines in particular, it was doomed from the start.

On November 27, 1966, the EL terminated the Phoebe Snow for good, leaving the Lake Cities as the EL's last long-haul passenger train, using Phoebe Snow diner cars and sleeper service: a service that ran until the Lake Cities also was discontinued on January 5–6, 1970. The trademark tavern-lounge cars were placed in storage again after the final run, although they appeared occasionally at the rear of special trains until sold-off.

Until spring, 1969, the nighttime counterparts to the Phoebe Snow to Buffalo, the Owl (#15) westbound (in 1962 having lost its sleeping car), and New York Mail (#10) eastbound (in 1963 having lost its sleeping car), remained running. It ran as an express through New Jersey and the Poconos, between Hoboken and Scranton, making only at a stop in East Stroudsburg.

=== Amtrak ===
The EL discontinued its last long-distance passenger train, Lake Cities, on January 6, 1970, about 16 months before Amtrak took over most U.S. passenger train operations. Amtrak might have taken over the Hoboken-Chicago operation, but observers speculated that the EL wanted to rid itself of its passenger trains before that could happen.

On November 13, 1979, three years after Conrail assumed operation of the former EL lines, Amtrak operated an inspection train over the former route of the Phoebe Snow between Hoboken and Scranton to determine the feasibility of restoring rail service between the two cities, and to try to prevent the abandonment of the Lackawanna Cut-Off. Dubbed the Pocono Day Express, it was the last passenger train to run over the route of Phoebe Snow in the twentieth century.

Amtrak was facing budget cuts that threatened numerous routes across the country at that time, however. The addition of a new route, one which had not seen a passenger train in nearly a decade, was a low priority.

== Proposals for service restoration ==
On January 25, 2008, New York Senator Charles Schumer announced that Amtrak and the New York Department of Transportation were studying a proposal to create a passenger rail line between Syracuse, New York; Binghamton; and Scranton, with service on to New York City via the restored Lackawanna Cut-Off. Unlike the original Phoebe Snow train, which terminated at the ferry terminal in Hoboken, the new service would reach New York's Pennsylvania Station via the Kearny Connection.

Although Schumer's proposal reportedly has been shelved in favor of a routing via Albany, New York, New Jersey Transit is pursuing a proposal to offer commuter rail service between Scranton and New York City.

== Disposition of cars ==
The ACF coaches used on the Phoebe Snow were split up; most were sold to New York's Metropolitan Transportation Authority for use as commuter cars. At least one coach ended up with Conrail where it was used on the Valpo Local out of Chicago, and several were sold to the Delaware and Hudson Railroad. As of 2012, surviving coaches include:

- 310/1310: Kept in the former Lehigh Valley Railroad yard in Sayre, Pennsylvania, it is owned by the Myles Group, operator of the Tioga Central Railroad.
- 311/1311: converted into an open-air car, it runs on the Great Smoky Mountains Railroad
- 315/1315 and 317/1317: Formerly part of the Coe Rail dinner trains, they are now owned by the Medina Railroad Museum in New York.
- 318/1318: Privately owned in Iowa, it is being restored as a lounge car in a hybrid DL&W/EL paint livery.
- 325/1325: Restored as a Milwaukee Road coach, it currently runs on the Austin and Texas Central Railroad.

Both Tavern-Lounge cars (789 and 790) survive. Once used as parlor cars by the Long Island Rail Road, they were later acquired by Metro-North, which still uses them on inspection and business trains.

Both Budd-built streamlined diners (469/769 and 470/770) also survive. The 469 is fully operational, with several minor issues, while the 470 requires a full restoration. The 469 is owned by the Dining Car Society, a nonprofit historical group based in Port Jervis, New York, and is planned to be restored as DL&W 469. The 470 is owned by the owners of Genesee Valley Transportation and is stored on their Delaware-Lackawanna Railroad in Scranton, Pennsylvania awaiting a full restoration.

None of the sleeping cars survive.

== Sources ==
- Sanders, Craig (2003). Limiteds, Locals, and Expresses in Indiana, 1838–1971. Bloomington, Indiana: Indiana University Press. ISBN 978-0-253-34216-4.
- Taber, Thomas Townsend; Taber, Thomas Townsend III (1980). The Delaware, Lackawanna & Western Railroad in the Twentieth Century. Vol. 1. Muncy, PA: Privately printed. ISBN 0-9603398-2-5.
