= Buffalo, Cleveland and Chicago Railway =

Proposed railroad in the United States

Overview
- Locale: New York, Pennsylvania and Ohio

Technical
- Track gauge: 4 ft 8 1/2 in (1,435 mm) standard gauge

The Buffalo, Cleveland and Chicago Railway (BC&C) was a proposed railroad in the United States during the late 19th century. The company was incorporated in the states of New York and Pennsylvania in January 1881 by three New York bankers: Clark, Post, and Martin.

The railroad was to be parallel to William Vanderbilt's Lake Shore and Michigan Southern Railway from the east side of Cleveland to Buffalo, a distance of 185-miles (298 km). The route was surveyed during January and February 1881, but before construction could begin the BC&C was acquired in March 1881 by the Seney Syndicate. Those surveys were promptly used to construct the Buffalo-Cleveland portion of the mainline for that group's New York, Chicago and St. Louis Railway Company (later known as the Nickel Plate Road).
