= Lake Erie and Western Depot Historic District =

Historic district in Indiana, United States

- U.S. National Register of Historic Places
- U.S. Historic district
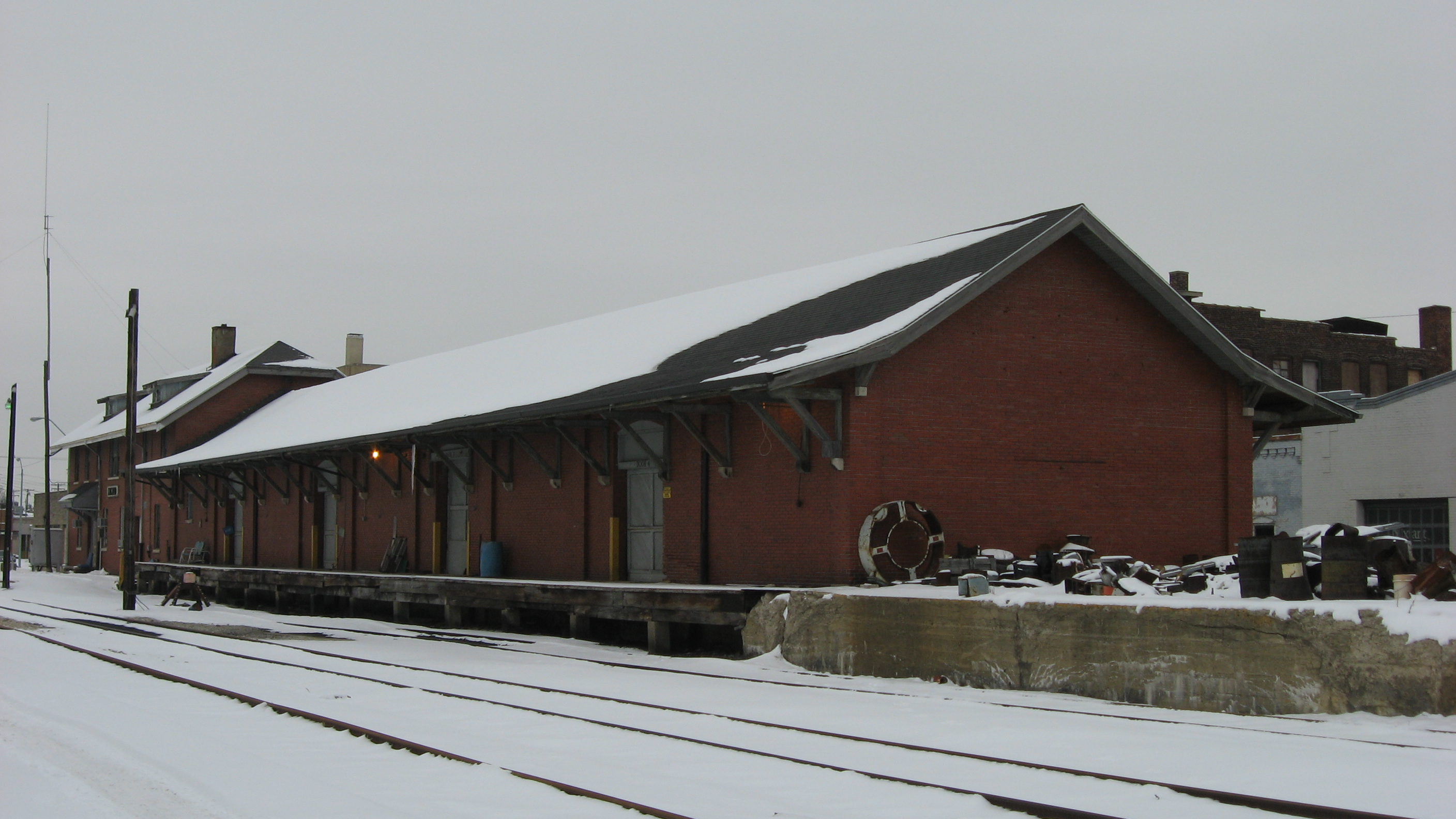
- Lake Erie and Western Depot, January 2011

- Location within Indiana Location within the United States
- Location: Generally bounded by W. Jefferson St. on the N., N. Main St. on the E., W. Jackson St. on the S., N. Washington on W., Kokomo, Indiana
- Coordinates: 40°29′24″N 86°07′57″W
- Area: 3.2 acres (1.3 ha)
- Built: 1913
- Architectural style: Romanesque, Late 19th And Early 20th Century American Movements
- NRHP reference No.: 08000917
- Added to NRHP: September 17, 2008

Lake Erie and Western Depot Historic District is a national historic district located at Kokomo, Indiana. The district includes seven contributing buildings and three contributing structures associated with the Lake Erie and Western Railroad train station at Kokomo. It includes the American Craftsman style passenger and freight depot (1916), a three-story Romanesque Revival style brick building with a limestone facade (1906), a three-story Romanesque influenced brick building (c. 1910), the massive three-story Neoclassical style S. Tudor & Co. building (c. 1905), "The Conwell" (1913), and three sets of railroad tracks.

It was listed on the National Register of Historic Places in 2008.
