= Van Sweringen brothers =

American railroad barons (1879–1936 and 1881–1935)

The Van Sweringen brothers, Mantis (left) and Oris (right)

Oris Paxton Van Sweringen (April 24, 1879 – November 22, 1936) and Mantis James Van Sweringen (July 8, 1881 – December 12, 1935) were American brothers who became railroad barons in order to develop Shaker Heights, Ohio. They are better known as O. P. Van Sweringen and M. J. Van Sweringen, or by their collective nickname, the Vans. The brothers came from a farming area near Wooster, Ohio. Their father was for a time an engineer in the oil fields of Pennsylvania, fought in the Civil War and was wounded at the Battle of Gettysburg. The family moved to Cleveland, Ohio, in about 1890.

Neither brother married. The two shared a common bedroom in their 54-room mansion, Roundwood Manor, on the grounds of their estate, Daisy Hill, in Hunting Valley, Ohio. During their lifetimes, they seldom gave interviews or made appearances in public. When they did, it was always together.

== Career ==
=== Real estate and Shaker Heights ===
Before the establishment of Shaker Heights, Ohio, the brothers were land and building speculators in Cleveland, Ohio. In 1909, the Van Sweringen brothers began exercising options on 1,399 acres (5.7 km^{2}) of land formerly owned by the North Union Community of the Society of Believers, better known as the Shakers. Conceived and planned as a garden community similar to Baltimore's Roland Park, Shaker Village (as it was originally referred to) soon became Cleveland's most sought-after address. This was achieved through a combination of planning, design review, and convenience – all of which fell under the strict supervision of the Van Sweringens.

Street planning for the new community used curved roads, instead of the more usual grid pattern of streets found in many American communities. Three tree-lined boulevards extended eastward into the country. Moreland and Shaker boulevards' center isles were used for trackbed for a planned interurban streetcar line. Both lines shared a common route from Cleveland through Shaker Square, recognized as the second modern planned shopping center in the United States, where they divided onto their own routes. The Van Sweringens designated Shaker Boulevard as a grand boulevard of mansions, fronted by generous setbacks from the interurban tracks. Higher-density luxury apartments were planned for Moreland Boulevard, which was renamed Van Aken Boulevard in honor of the city's first mayor.

Building in Shaker was controlled by a set of restrictive covenants and building guidelines established by the Van Sweringens and known as Shaker Standards. Shaker Standards prevented the community from being developed in any way contrary to how the Van Sweringens intended, including barring African Americans. Standards limited commercial development, rental property development, and residence style and size. Standards set roof slope angles, materials, finishes, and garage placement.

All residences were required to be unique and designed by an architect. Duplex residences in the community were restricted to designated areas and were required to follow guidelines designed to give the impression that a structure was a single-family home. By 1920, the Van Sweringens controlled more than 4,000 acres (16 km^{2}) in the community, which reached city status in 1931. Since lots sold slowly, the brothers concluded that Shaker Heights needed a transportation system between the suburb and downtown.

=== Railroad projects ===
In 1913, the Van Sweringens established the Cleveland Interurban Railroad, which managed the operation of their streetcar lines in what is now Cleveland Heights, Ohio. In order to provide convenience to residents of Shaker Heights, the Van Sweringens planned a high-speed interurban styled electric rail line, which was christened Shaker Heights Rapid Transit and commonly known as the Rapid. This prompted the Van Sweringens to purchase land in the vicinity of Public Square in downtown Cleveland as early as 1909 to provide a terminus for their rapid transit line. Their Rapids could travel at speeds of up to 50 miles per hour (80 km/h), but the line could not be moved farther west than 34th Street.

In order to meet the Van Sweringens' guidelines that the Rapid would not travel in street traffic, the brothers bought a 51% interest in the 523-mile (842-km) New York, Chicago and St. Louis Railroad (Nickel Plate Road) in 1915 from the New York Central Railroad. The route gave the Van Sweringens an unobstructed path to downtown Cleveland. From this acquisition, the Van Sweringens formed the Nickel Plate Securities Corporation, from which they used investor money to buy a controlling interest in other major United States rail companies.

At their zenith in 1928, the Van Sweringens controlled 30,000 miles (50,000 km) of rail worth $3 billion, nearly all of it purchased through credit. Lines under their control included the Erie Railroad, Pere Marquette Railway, Hocking Valley Railway, and Chesapeake and Ohio Railway. They managed to control this huge (for the time) system by a maze of holding companies (including the Alleghany Corporation) and interlocking directorships.

To solve the problem of the passenger station, the Van Sweringens purchased more rights-of-way that gave them access to the area below the southwest corner of Cleveland's Public Square. Again, the Van Sweringens planned another city within a city to solve their rail dilemma. The result was the Union Terminal Complex, a mix of high-rise offices, shopping, and hotel aboveground, with a train depot and rapid station below grade. The centerpiece of this massive complex was named Terminal Tower, which was the second tallest skyscraper in the United States at the time of its completion.

=== The Terminal Tower ===
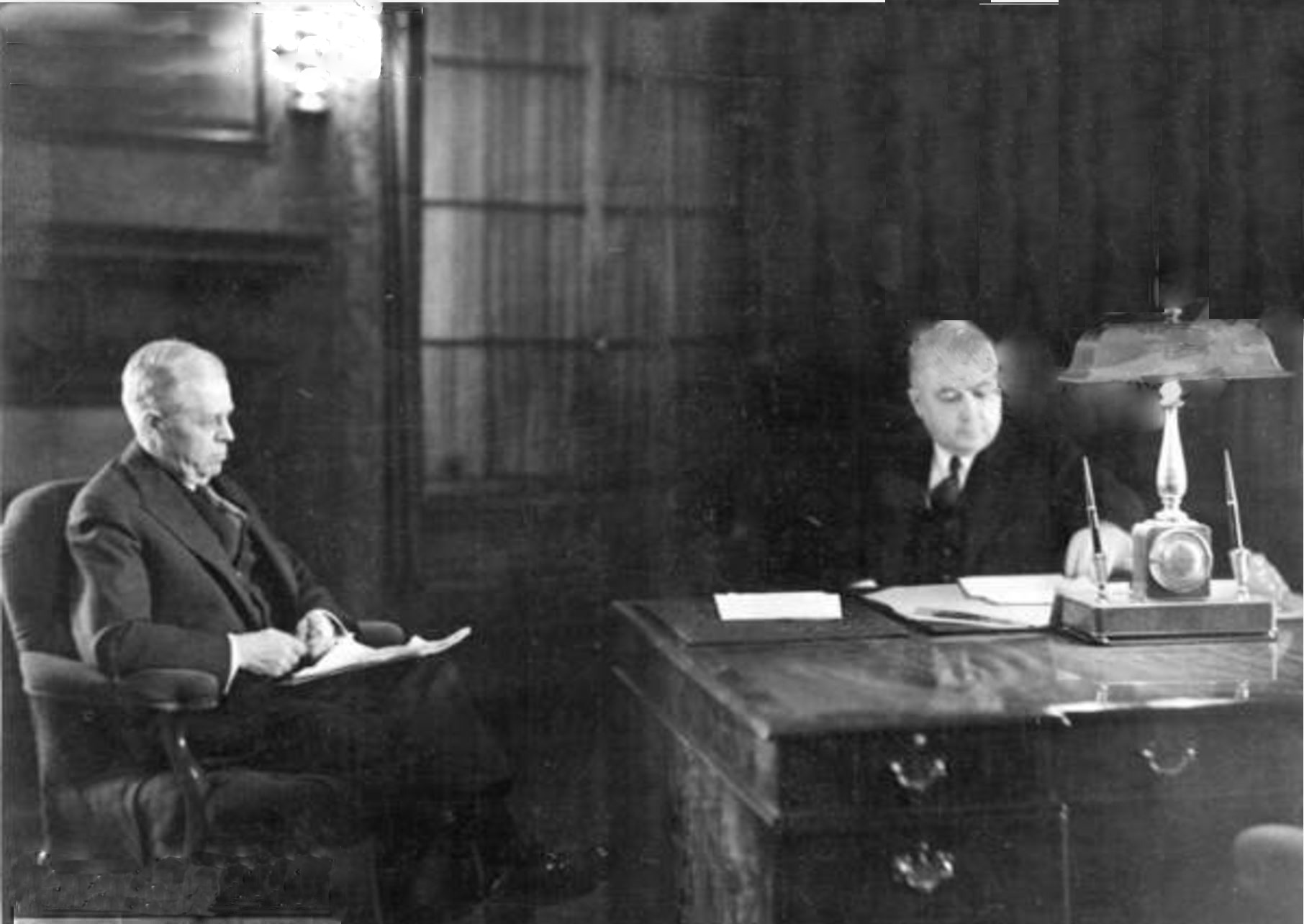
The Van Sweringen brothers in their Terminal Tower offices, 1928.

The Van Sweringens realized that if their plans for a Public Square station were to succeed, they would have to include all the electric railways, including streetcars, rapid transit, interurban lines, and local freight and warehousing facilities. Following the suggestion of an official of the Baltimore and Ohio Railroad, they added plans to include steam railways.

On March 1, 1917, the engineers of the Erie Railroad, the Nickel Plate, and the Cleveland Terminal Company reported that a new freight-and-passenger terminal located on Public Square in downtown Cleveland would be economical. The plan provided twelve stub-end tracks for the steam passenger trains, with loops for local and interurban cars above. The space above the tracks was to be developed for stores and office buildings.

In 1918, A.H. Smith, the Eastern Director of the United States Railroad Administration and the president of the New York Central Railroad, asked whether or not the proposed facility could be sufficiently enlarged to include the railroads using the lakefront station. Thus, it was Smith who initiated the idea for a "Union Station" on Public Square. In 1919, the Pennsylvania Railroad withdrew from the project. Smith, in his capacity as the president of the NYCRR, allied with the Van Sweringens, was a fierce antagonist of the Pennsylvania Railroad.

In 1923, the Van Sweringens announced their plans to build The Terminal Tower, a tall building to increase office space, over the Union Station to compare to the Woolworth Building in New York City. It was necessary to design the buildings to avoid vibrations from the trains below. In 1926, construction began. 16 caissons each went down 200 to 250 feet (60 to 75 m) to support the weight of the building. Construction was completed in 1930.

== Decline and death ==
The fortunes of the Van Sweringens rose in the 1920s. By 1929, their holdings were valued at $3 billion, mostly as a result of the high valuation of stocks on the New York Stock Exchange. Upon the coming of the Great Depression, the brothers' rail empire suffered financial difficulties. Loans were foreclosed upon and assets were sold to meet interest payments for their debts.

In 1933, O.P. Van Sweringen testified before the United States Senate Committee on Banking and Currency, in Washington, D.C., and during testimony, described their complex business dealings as it related to railroads.

In 1934, M.J. Van Sweringen's health began to decline. He died on December 12, 1935, at the age of 54.

O.P. died on board a train near Hoboken of coronary thrombosis on November 22, 1936, at the age of 57. At the time of his death, O.P.'s net worth was less than $3,000.

The brothers are buried together in Cleveland's Lakeview Cemetery under a tombstone that reads: "Brothers".
