= Rhaetian Railway Ge 2/2 =

Swiss electric locomotive

Bernina-Bahngesellschaft Ge 2/2 Rhaetian Railway Ge 2/2
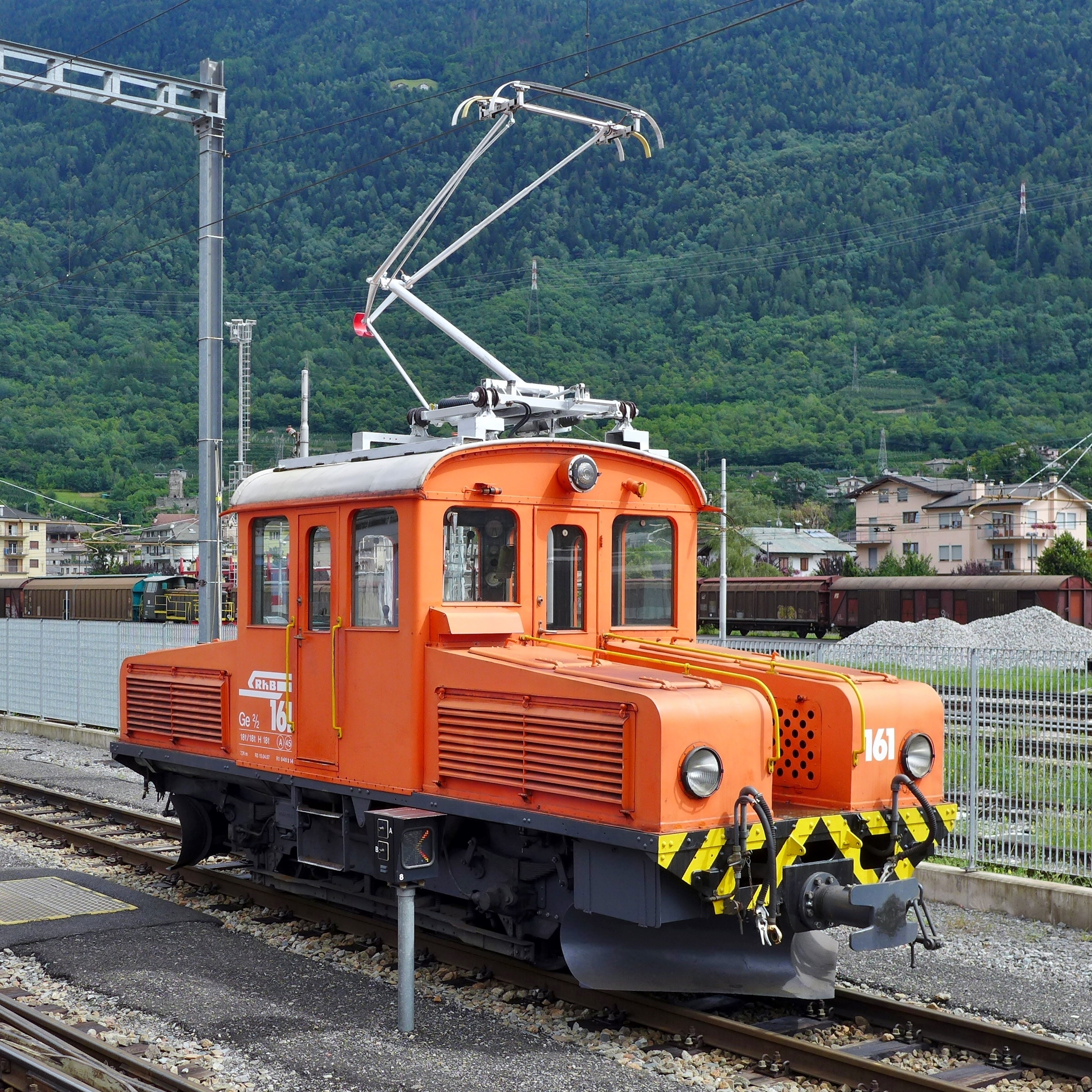
- Ge 2/2 161 at Tirano, 2014
Type and origin
- Power type: Electric
- Build date: 1911
- Total produced: 2
Specifications
- Configuration
  - Whyte: 4wOE
  - UIC: Bo
- Gauge: 1,000 mm (3 ft 3 3/8 in) metre gauge
- Electric system/s: 1 kV DC Overhead
- Current pickup(s): Pantograph
Career
- Operators: Bernina Railway, Rhaetian Railway
- Numbers: BB: 61, 62, RhB: 161, 162
- Official name: Ge 2/2
- Locale: Graubünden, Switzerland
- Current owner: Rhaetian Railway
- Disposition: Both still in service

The Rhaetian Railway Ge 2/2 is a class of small metre gauge 1 kV DC electric locomotives operated by the Rhaetian Railway (RhB), which is the main railway network in the Canton of Graubünden, Switzerland.

The class is so named under the Swiss locomotive and railcar classification system. According to that system, Ge 2/2 denotes a narrow gauge electric adhesion locomotive with a total of two axles, both of which are drive axles. There are only two locomotives in the class, and they are numbered 161 and 162.

Both direct current locomotives were procured by the Berninabahn (BB) in 1911 for piloting duties. The then still brown liveried machines were given the numbers Ge 2/2 61 and 62, and were equipped with Lyra pantographs. After the Rhaetian Railway takeover of the BB, they were given the new numbers they still bear. Today, they work mainly as shunting locomotives in Poschiavo.

On the Appenzeller Bahnen (AB), there is another locomotive, Te 49, that is of similar appearance, and dates from 1912. Between 1955 and 1975, it operated as Ge 2/2 49.
