= Marguerite Souther =

American dance educator

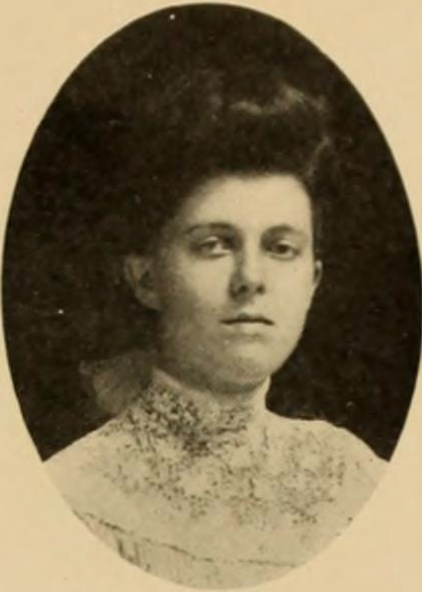
- Marguerite Souther, from the 1904 yearbook of Smith College
- Born: April 3, 1882; Jamaica Plain, Massachusetts, U.S.
- Died: July 15, 1975 (aged 93); Newton, Massachusetts, U.S.
- Occupations: Dance educator, community leader
- Relatives: John Souther (grandfather)

Marguerite "Rita" P. Souther (April 3, 1882 – July 15, 1975) was an American dance educator and community leader, based all her life in Boston's Jamaica Plain neighborhood.

== Early life and education ==
Souther was born in Jamaica Plain, the daughter of Charles Henry Souther and Mary Louisa Wheelock Souther. Her grandfather was engineer and inventor John Souther. She graduated from Smith College in 1904.

== Career ==
Souther began offering dance lessons after college; these soon grew into society dance classes at Eliot Hall in Jamaica Plain, popular for children and young adults from elite families. Her classes also included instruction on dress, diet, and etiquette. She retired from teaching in the 1960s, leaving the school to her niece, Barbara Southern Cooke. In 1962, she was honored with a surprise party attended by her former students.

Souther was a familiar and respected figure in Jamaica Plain, beyond the dance classroom. She was a member of the Tuesday Club, and provided collateral to save the Loring–Greenough House from demolition in 1924. She was a volunteer librarian at Faulkner Hospital. She donated her grandfather's papers to the National Museum of American History, and made other donations to the Boston Athenaeum and the Museum of Fine Arts in Boston.

== Personal life and legacy ==
Souther died in 1975, at the age of 93, in Newton. Her family's estate is now the site of a retirement community.
