= Chicago Limited (DLW train) =

American named passenger train (1917–1941)

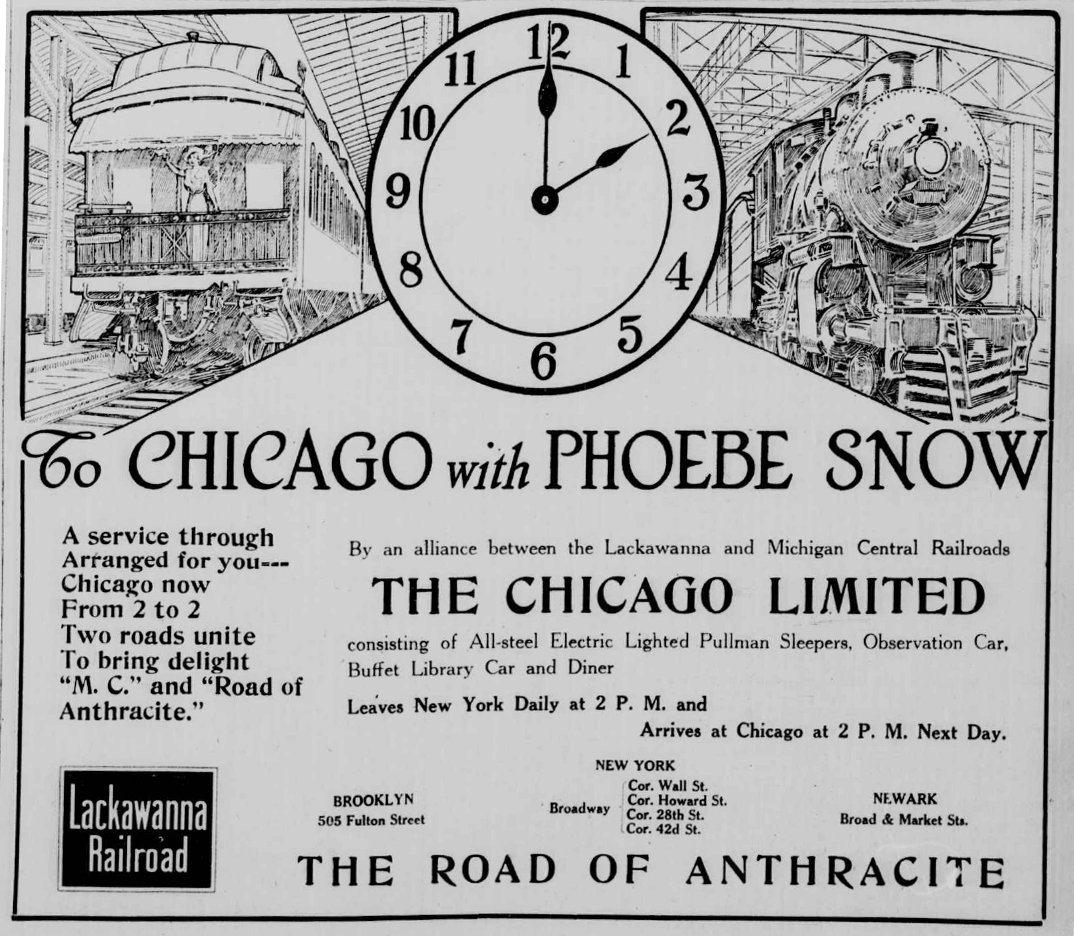
- Newspaper ad from 1914.

Overview
- Service type: Inter-city rail
- Status: Discontinued
- Locale: Midwestern United States/Northeastern United States
- First service: 1917
- Last service: 1941
- Successor: Phoebe Snow
- Former operators: Delaware, Lackawanna and Western Railroad (DL&W); Michigan Central Railroad (MCR); Wabash Railroad

Route
- Termini: Hoboken, New Jersey; Chicago
- Distance travelled: 396 miles (637 km)
- Average journey time: 8 hours
- Service frequency: Daily
- Train numbers: 5 (DLW) - 17 (MCR) (westbound); 40 (MCR) - 6 (DLW) (eastbound) (1940)

On-board services
- Seating arrangements: Coaches
- Sleeping arrangements: Sections, double bedrooms
- Catering facilities: Dining car, lounge car

Technical
- Track gauge: 1,435 mm (4 ft 8 1/2 in)

The Chicago Limited was a train running from Hoboken, New Jersey to Chicago, Illinois run by the Lackawanna Railroad and west of Buffalo connecting with the Michigan Central Railroad's Wolverine, taking a route through Southwestern Ontario. The train left New York at 2 pm and would arrive in Chicago at 2 pm the next day. The Wabash Railroad's #1-11 hitched with the train for coach and sleeper service that veered from the Michigan Central route from Detroit westward. It took the Wabash's most southernly route through Montpelier, Ohio.

Eastbound, the train carried the name, Lackawanna Limited. Full service to Chicago ended in 1941. The DLW portion continued between Buffalo, New York and Hoboken was continued to 1949 and in that year was given a renaming as the DLW's Phoebe Snow.
