= Souther (meteorology) =

In meteorology, Souther is a strong wind coming from the south. It's also a term widely used in maritime jargon to indicate, in fact, generally "strong wind from the south".
