= Lake Erie and Western Railroad =

Historical railroad in the Midwestern United States

- Natural Gas Route
- Lake Erie and Western Railroad as of 1918, including the leased Northern Ohio Railway

Overview
- Headquarters: Peoria, Illinois
- Locale: Midwestern United States
- Dates of operation: 1887–1923
- Predecessor: Lake Erie & Western Railway
- Successor: New York, Chicago & St. Louis Railroad

Technical
- Track gauge: 4 ft 8 1/2 in (1,435 mm) standard gauge
- Length: 709.91 miles (1,142.49 km)

The Lake Erie and Western Railroad was a railroad that operated in Ohio, Indiana and Illinois. The Lake Erie and Western main line extended from Sandusky, Ohio, 412 miles (663 km) westward to Peoria, Illinois, passing through Fremont and Fostoria, Ohio, Muncie and Lafayette, Indiana, and Bloomington, Illinois. It also had main lines extending from Indianapolis to Michigan City, Indiana and from Fort Wayne to Connersville, Indiana. Principal branch lines extended from St. Marys' to Minster, Ohio and from New Castle to Rushville, Indiana.

The Lake Erie and Western Depot Historic District at Kokomo, Indiana, was listed on the National Register of Historic Places in 2008.

== Beginning and growth ==
The Lake Erie and Western Railroad was incorporated in Illinois, February 10, 1887. The "Natural Gas Route" had its beginnings in several railroads dating back to the mid-1850s, the oldest being the Peru and Indianapolis Railroad, incorporated in Indiana, January 19, 1846. The Seney Syndicate linked several short railroads in Ohio, Indiana, and Illinois along with the first "The Lake Erie and Western Railway Company" of 1879. Subsequent consolidations and foreclosure sales resulted in variations of the Lake Erie and Western name, culminating in the Lake Erie and Western Railroad.

== Control ==
The Lake Erie and Western itself controlled and leased the Northern Ohio Railway and jointly controlled 10% of the Peoria and Pekin Union Railway.

In 1900, the Lake Erie and Western came under the control of the New York Central Railroad. After operating it as a separate entity for two decades, the New York Central sold the Lake Erie and Western to the Nickel Plate in 1922.

== Sources ==
- Rehor, John A. (1994). The Nickel Plate story. Waukesha, WI: Kalmbach Publishing Co. ISBN 0-89024-012-4.
