= Nickel Plate Road =

Railway in the mid-central United States (1881–1964)

- System map at time of consolidation
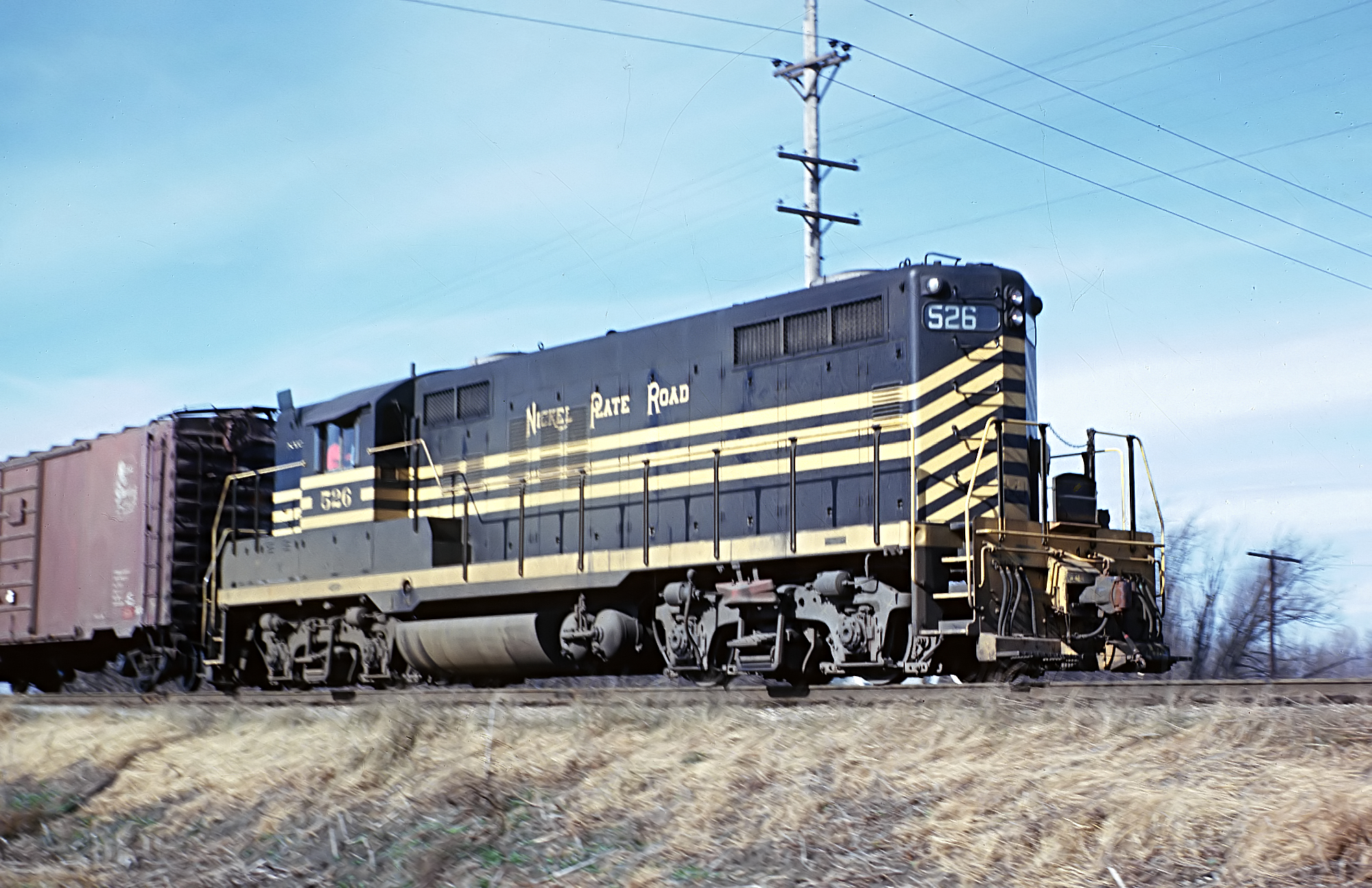
- Nickel Plate Road GP9 number 526 switches a way freight at Gibson City, IL, on November 24, 1962.

Overview
- Headquarters: Cleveland, Ohio
- Reporting mark: NKP
- Locale: Buffalo, NY to Chicago and St. Louis, MO - extensive operations in Illinois, Indiana, Ohio, and Pennsylvania
- Dates of operation: 1881–1964
- Successor: Norfolk and Western

Technical
- Track gauge: 4 ft 8 1/2 in (1,435 mm) standard gauge

The New York, Chicago and St. Louis Railroad (reporting mark NKP), abbreviated NYC&St.L, was a railroad that operated in the mid-central United States from 1881 to 1964. Commonly referred to as the "Nickel Plate Road", the railroad served parts of the states of New York, Pennsylvania, Ohio, Indiana, Illinois, and Missouri. Its primary connections occurred in Buffalo, Chicago, Cincinnati, Cleveland, Indianapolis, St. Louis, and Toledo.

The Nickel Plate Road was constructed in 1881 along the South Shore of the Great Lakes to connect Buffalo and Chicago, in competition with the Lake Shore and Michigan Southern Railway. At the end of 1960, NKP operated 2,170 miles (3,490 km) of road on 4,009 miles (6,452 km) of track, not including the 25 miles (40 km) of Lorain & West Virginia. That year it reported 9.758 billion net ton-miles of revenue freight and 41 million passenger-miles.

In 1964, the Nickel Plate Road and several other midwestern carriers were merged into the larger Norfolk and Western Railway (N&W). The goal of the N&W expansion was to form a more competitive and successful system serving 14 states and the Canadian province of Ontario on more than 7,000 miles (11,000 km) of railroad. In 1982, the profitable N&W was combined with the also profitable Southern Railway to form the Norfolk Southern (NS).

== History ==
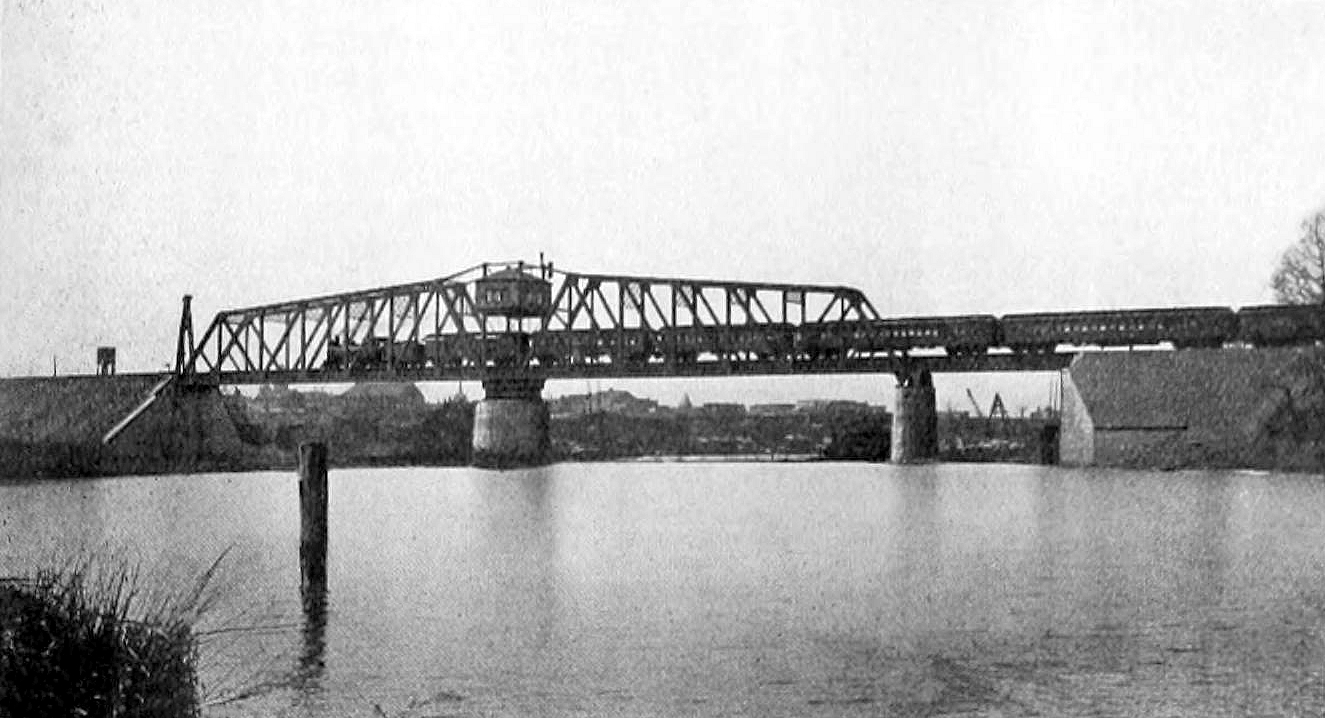
New York, Chicago and St. Louis Railroad train crossing Black River in Lorain, Ohio, 1906

=== Background ===
In the 25 years after the American Civil War, railway track mileage in the United States more than doubled, changing the face of America. Rail transportation meant that products made in the East could be shipped West for far less than previously. This allowed for economies of scale and larger, more efficient factories. The agricultural heartland of America was no longer confined to a market of a single day's wagon ride. Railroad and railroad construction became one of the largest industries. By 1881, one out of 32 people in the United States was either employed by a railroad or engaged in railroad construction.

Starting about 1877, two great railroad developers, William H. Vanderbilt and Jay Gould, began competing for the railroad traffic along the south shore of the Great Lakes. By 1878, Vanderbilt had a monopoly on rail traffic between Buffalo, New York; Cleveland, Ohio; Detroit, Michigan; and Chicago, because he owned the only railroad linking those cities - the Lake Shore and Michigan Southern Railway. In addition, he was the richest man in America at that time. By 1881, Gould controlled about 15% of all U.S. railroad mileage, most of it west of the Mississippi River and he was considered the most ruthless financial operator in America. His major railroad east of the Mississippi River was the 335-mile (539 km) Wabash, St. Louis and Pacific Railway (Wabash). The Wabash mainline ran from St. Louis, Missouri, to Toledo, Ohio, where it was forced to deliver its railroad traffic to William H. Vanderbilt's Lake Shore Railroad for delivery to the eastern United States.

Gould and Vanderbilt together oversaw all east–west rail traffic in the mid-west. The Seney Syndicate, owners of a 350-mile (560 km) railroad, the Lake Erie and Western Railroad, were interested in tapping new sources of revenue. The stage was set for the creation of the New York, Chicago and St. Louis Railroad.

=== Early years ===
The Seney Syndicate, headed by banker George I. Seney, met at Seney's New York City bank and organized the New York, Chicago and St. Louis Railway Company on February 3, 1881. The original proposal for the NYC&StL was a 340-mile (550 km) railroad west from Cleveland, Ohio, to Chicago, Illinois, with a 325-mile (523 km) branch to St. Louis, Missouri.

On April 13, 1881, the New York, Chicago and St. Louis Railway Company bought the Buffalo, Cleveland and Chicago Railway, a railroad that had been surveyed from the west side of Cleveland, Ohio, to Buffalo, New York, running parallel to William Vanderbilt's Lake Shore and Michigan Southern Railway.

The idea of an east–west railroad across northern Ohio was very popular with the people of Ohio. They wanted to break the high freight rates charged by Jay Gould and William Vanderbilt. No one was less popular in Ohio than Vanderbilt since the December 29, 1876, collapse of the Lake Shore and Michigan Southern Railway's Ashtabula River trestle, where 64 people had been injured and 92 were killed or died later from injuries.

Another reason for the popularity of the New York, Chicago and St. Louis Railway was the positive economic impact on any cities that a new railroad went through. During a newspaper war to attract the NYC&St.L, the Norwalk, Ohio, Chronicle Newspaper referred to it as a "... double-track, nickel-plated railroad." The railroad adopted the nickname and it became better known as the Nickel Plate Road.

It was decided that building would start along the surveyed route between Cleveland and Buffalo rather than build the branch to St. Louis. Five hundred days later, the Nickel Plate's 513-mile (826 km) single-track mainline from Buffalo to Chicago was complete. The railroad was estimated to require 90,000 long tons (80,000 metric tons) of steel rails, each weighing 60 pounds per linear yard (30 kg/m) and 1.5 million oak crossties. Additionally, the railroad required 49 major bridges. It was characterized by long sections of straight track, mild grades, and impressive bridges. The Nickel Plate ran its first trains over the entire system on October 16, 1882.

During construction, Vanderbilt and Gould had watched with great interest. If either of them could acquire the Nickel Plate, they could end the threat to their railroads. If the Nickel Plate remained independent it would be able to create a substantial dent in both entrepreneurs' railroad earnings.

Vanderbilt tried to lower the value of the Nickel Plate by organizing a campaign to smear its reputation before a train ever ran on its tracks. If Vanderbilt was successful, he could scare the Seney Syndicate into selling to him or drive the railroad company into bankruptcy. However, Vanderbilt's plan came with two important risks. If he slandered the line, he risked chasing the Seney Syndicate into an alliance with Gould. The other risk was that his plan to smear the Nickel Plate's reputation might fail and it could quickly grow. Vanderbilt claimed the road was being built with substandard materials and it would use unsafe practices once completed. He succeeded in creating long-standing rumors about the line but failed to devalue the company or scare the investors.

The cost of construction was higher than expected and the Seney Syndicate began to negotiate with Gould to purchase the railroad, but unlike Vanderbilt, Gould lacked the capital. Frustrated at the failing talks, Gould broke off negotiations and gave up on his attempt to break Vanderbilt.

=== The Lake Shore and Michigan Southern era ===
In early 1881, Vanderbilt could have had the Nickel Plate for one million dollars, equal to $33,400,000 today. He realized if he allowed Gould to gain control of the Nickel Plate, his monopoly on rail traffic from Toledo, Ohio, to the east would be broken. He decided he would do anything to keep the Nickel Plate out of Gould's hands.

On October 25, 1882, (a few days after the first trains ran) the Seney Syndicate sold the Nickel Plate to Vanderbilt for $7.2 million, equal to $240,200,000 today. Vanderbilt transferred it to his Lake Shore and Michigan Southern Railway. However, Vanderbilt had a problem: he could not run the business into the ground or it would fall into receivership and someone else would buy it. He could not close the Nickel Plate either because it cost a fortune to buy. So, the Nickel Plate Road did business, but just enough to keep it solvent. By the advent of the 1920s, the Nickel Plate was an obscure line that earned its keep through the transfer of freight from other rail connections. During the same period Vanderbilt's Lake Shore and Michigan Southern prospered and expanded.

Vanderbilt kept most of the rail traffic on his Lake Shore and Michigan Southern. Fewer trains on the Nickel Plate meant that they could move faster, so that is the railroad traffic they went after. By 1888 the Nickel Plate had been dubbed "The Meat Express Line." Observers at Fort Wayne, Indiana, reported six long meat trains every night and a couple of fruit trains during the day.

Vanderbilt consolidated many of his railroads into the New York Central Railroad. Over time, the Nickel Plate was reduced as a serious threat to the New York Central and other competing lines.

Unlike many railroads that established a primary repair shop site, the Nickel Plate maintained several "back shops" that were more or less equal in size. By the late 1800s, facilities that could handle major locomotive and car rebuilding were located at Stony Island Yard (outside of Chicago); Frankfort, Indiana; and Conneaut and Bellevue, Ohio. By the 1920s the shops had been consolidated primarily to Fort Wayne, Indiana; Conneaut, Ohio; Bellevue, Ohio; and Stony Island.

=== The Van Sweringen era ===
The Van Sweringen brothers of Cleveland, Ohio, were the next owners of the Nickel Plate. Oris Paxton Van Sweringen and his younger brother Mantis James Van Sweringen were real estate developers who had constructed a rapid transit line from their development at Shaker Heights, Ohio, to downtown Cleveland. As early as 1909, the brothers proposed a stub-end terminal on Public Square in downtown Cleveland. The Cleveland interurbans and traction companies were in favor of the new terminal and right-of-ways leading to it.

The Nickel Plate was the key. It traversed Cleveland from east to west, had a high level crossing of the Cuyahoga River Valley, and was adjacent to the proposed terminal. The Nickel Plate also provided a natural route to the proposed terminal for the Van Sweringen's rapid transit and the other traction lines.

Between 1890 and 1913, Cleveland had a fourfold increase in population. Civic and political leaders wanted to clean up the city and started many projects. One was a desire to consolidate all of Cleveland's railroad stations. The Lake Shore and Michigan Southern Railway, Pennsylvania Railroad, and the Big Four Railroad shared a crowded lakefront Union Station. The Erie Railroad, Baltimore and Ohio Railroad, Nickel Plate Road, and the Wheeling and Lake Erie Railroad all occupied separate stations on the north bluff of the Cuyahoga River, just south of downtown. The city also encouraged the railroads to build grade separation throughout the city. The Nickel Plate started a grade separation project on the East Side of Cleveland in 1909 and finished in 1913. Cleveland approved a bond issue in 1910 to "depress" the Nickel Plate through the most congested part of the West Side.

The Lake Shore and Michigan Southern Railway was controlled by the New York Central Railroad's Alfred Holland Smith, a close friend of the Van Sweringens. He had guided the Van Sweringens and even financed their rapid transit to Shaker Heights. In late 1915, the Attorney General of the United States advised the New York Central that its control of the Lake Shore and Michigan Southern and the Nickel Plate was in violation of the Federal antitrust laws. On February 1, 1916, Alfred Smith called his friends, the Van Sweringens, and offered them the Nickel Plate. They bought it for $8.5 million on April 13, 1916, equal to $251,500,000 today. In return for operating concessions and access to certain stations, they put up only a little over $500,000 (equal to $14,790,000 today) but they controlled 75% of Nickel Plate's voting stock.

The Van Sweringens had no intention of running the Nickel Plate. Alfred Smith was happy to give the Van Sweringens a vice-president of the New York Central, John J. Bernet, and some of his top men. Smith wanted to show that the Van Sweringens were not New York Central puppets, and the Nickel Plate needed to earn money to retire the $6.5 million in notes owed to the New York Central.

=== NKP president John Bernet era ===
During Bernet's reign, the Nickel Plate grew substantially. In 1922, the Nickel Plate purchased the Lake Erie and Western Railroad, giving it access to Sandusky, Ohio, and Peoria, Illinois. Later that year, on December 28, the Nickel Plate purchased the Toledo, St. Louis and Western Railroad, also known as the "Clover Leaf Route", finally giving the Nickel Plate access to the St. Louis area, as well as to the port in Toledo, Ohio.

Bernet also doubled the railroad's total freight tonnage and average speeds system wide, while cutting fuel consumption in half. He left the Nickel Plate in late 1926.

Bernet returned to the Nickel Plate in 1933. In 1934, he ordered fifteen 2-8-4 "Berkshire" locomotives, which would become legendary with the Nickel Plate. Bernet remained as the president of the company until his death in 1935.

On December 29, 1937, the Chesapeake and Ohio Railway gained control of the Nickel Plate. One major factor was Frank Allen Brown, who was the assistant superintendent at this time. Brown held this position from 1937 to 1944.

=== World War II and post-war era ===
During World War II, the Nickel Plate, like all other American railroads, found itself helping with the war effort. The Nickel Plate ordered an additional 55 Berkshires during the war.

After the war, in 1947, the Chesapeake and Ohio Railway ended its control of the Nickel Plate when it sold off its remaining shares. That year, the Nickel Plate also ordered 11 ALCO PA diesel-electric locomotives, named the "Bluebirds". These were the first locomotives for the Nickel Plate that were not painted black since the early 1900s.

In 1949, the Nickel Plate received its last Berkshire, #779, also the last steam locomotive built by the Lima Locomotive Works. Later that year, on December 1, the Nickel Plate leased the Wheeling and Lake Erie Railway.

In 1960, the last steam locomotive was retired from service, officially "dieselizing" the Nickel Plate.

==== Passenger service ====
The Nickel Plate had a few long-distance night trains, whose names varied according to whether the train was west-bound or eastbound. The trains linked at Lackawanna Station in Buffalo to continue to Hoboken, New Jersey.

- No. 5 City of Chicago (westbound) / No. 6 City of Cleveland (eastbound) (Chicago-Cleveland-Buffalo)
- No. 7 Westerner (westbound) / No. 8 New Yorker (eastbound) (Chicago-Cleveland-Buffalo)
- No. 9 Blue Arrow (westbound) / No. 10 Blue Dart (eastbound) (St. Louis-Muncie-Cleveland)

=== Merger with N&W, Norfolk Southern ===
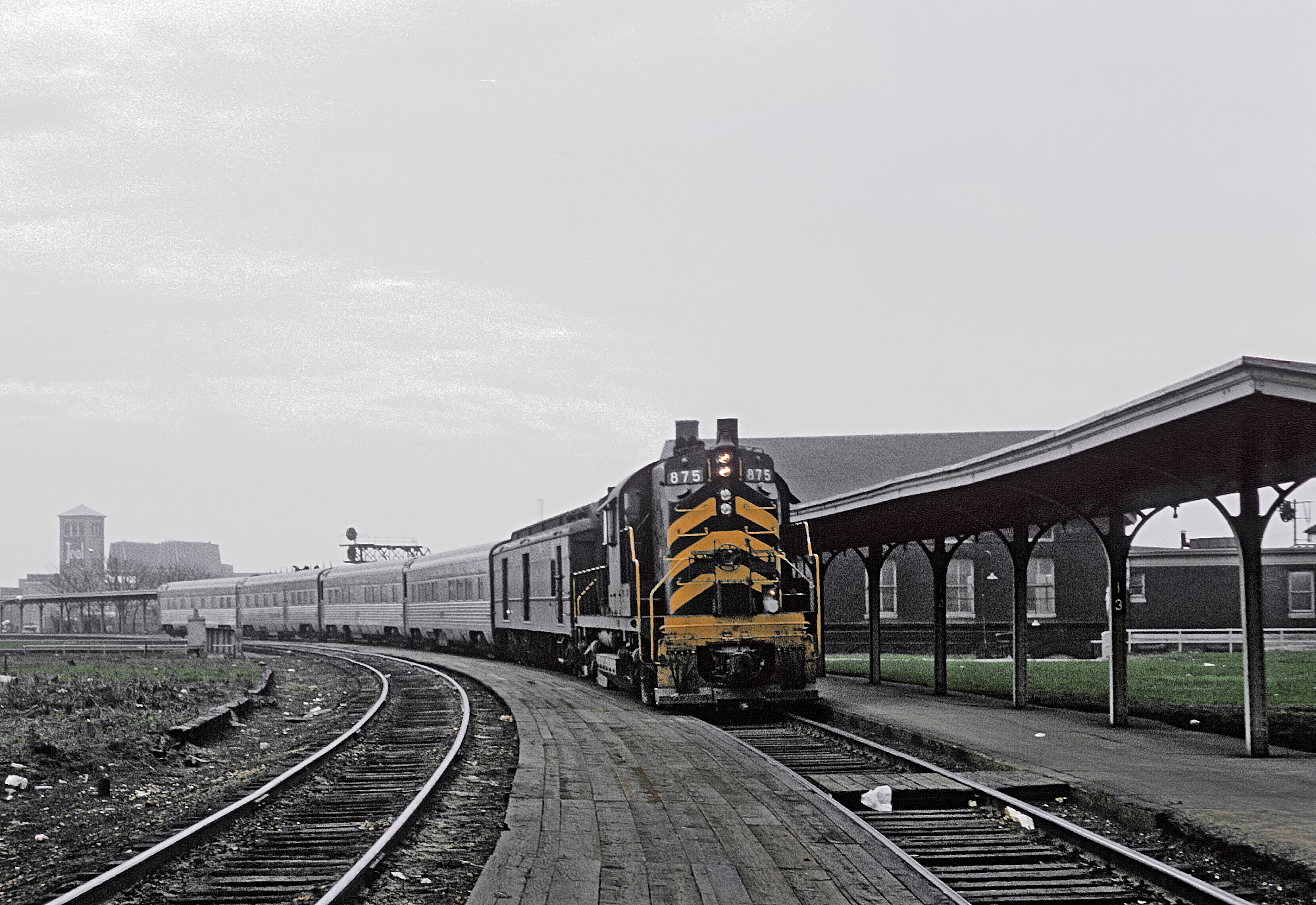
Nickel Plate train number 5, City of Chicago at Englewood Union Station on April 21, 1965.

The financial situation of American railroading continued to decline after World War II as the highway system improved and the US Interstate system was built. The Nickel Plate Road, together with the Wabash and several smaller carriers, merged with the profitable Norfolk and Western (N&W) on October 16, 1964.

N&W had merged with long-time rival Virginian Railway in the Pocahontas coal region in 1959, and grew through the mergers with other rail carriers including the Nickel Plate and Wabash railroads with operations in adjacent areas of the eastern United States to form a more competitive and successful system serving 14 states and a province of Canada on more than 7,000 miles (11,000 km) of road.

The profitable N&W was combined with the also profitable Southern Railway to form the Norfolk Southern (NS) in 1982.

== Chicago terminals ==
By 1897 the Nickel Plate had obtained trackage rights over the Lake Shore and Michigan Southern Railway from Grand Crossing to its own terminal on the east side of the LS&MS line to LaSalle Street Station, just north of 12th Street (now Roosevelt Road). By 1928 it used LaSalle.

== Origin of the Nickel Plate nickname ==
In an address given to the Newcomen Society of the United States in Erie, Pennsylvania, on November 11, 1954. Lynne L. White (a former president of the Nickel Plate) said:

Through northern Ohio, already served by four railroads, location of the line developed intense rivalries among cities. Three routes were surveyed and communities along each proposed route vied in the raising of public subscriptions to donate rights-of-way. The road's general offices at Cleveland frequently were besieged by delegations hoping to bring about the routing of the line through their communities. During these inter-city rivalries was born the nickname for the New York, Chicago and St. Louis - The Nickel Plate Road - which rapidly became the name most commonly used.

Numerous legends have grown about when and how the name "Nickel Plate" was first applied. The accepted version is that it appeared first in an article in the Norwalk, Ohio, Chronicle of March 10, 1881. On that date the Chronicle reported the arrival of a party of engineers to make a survey for the "great New York and St. Louis double track, nickel plated railroad."

Later, while attempting to induce the company to build the line through Norwalk instead of Bellevue, Ohio, the Chronicle again referred to the road as "nickel plated" - a term regarded as indicative of the project's glittering prospects and substantial financial backing.

In 1882, the Nickel Plate recognized F.R. Loomis, owner and editor of the Norwalk Chronicle, as originator of the term and issued him Complimentary Pass No. 1.

Thus Norwalk named the road - but Bellevue finally got it.

To continue the tradition and preserve the history and name of the Nickel Plate Road, HGR Industrial Surplus, current owner of the former General Motors Fisher Auto Body site in Euclid, Ohio, on the Nickel Plate Road line dedicated its site as "Nickel Plate Station" on October 1, 2015.

== Heritage unit ==
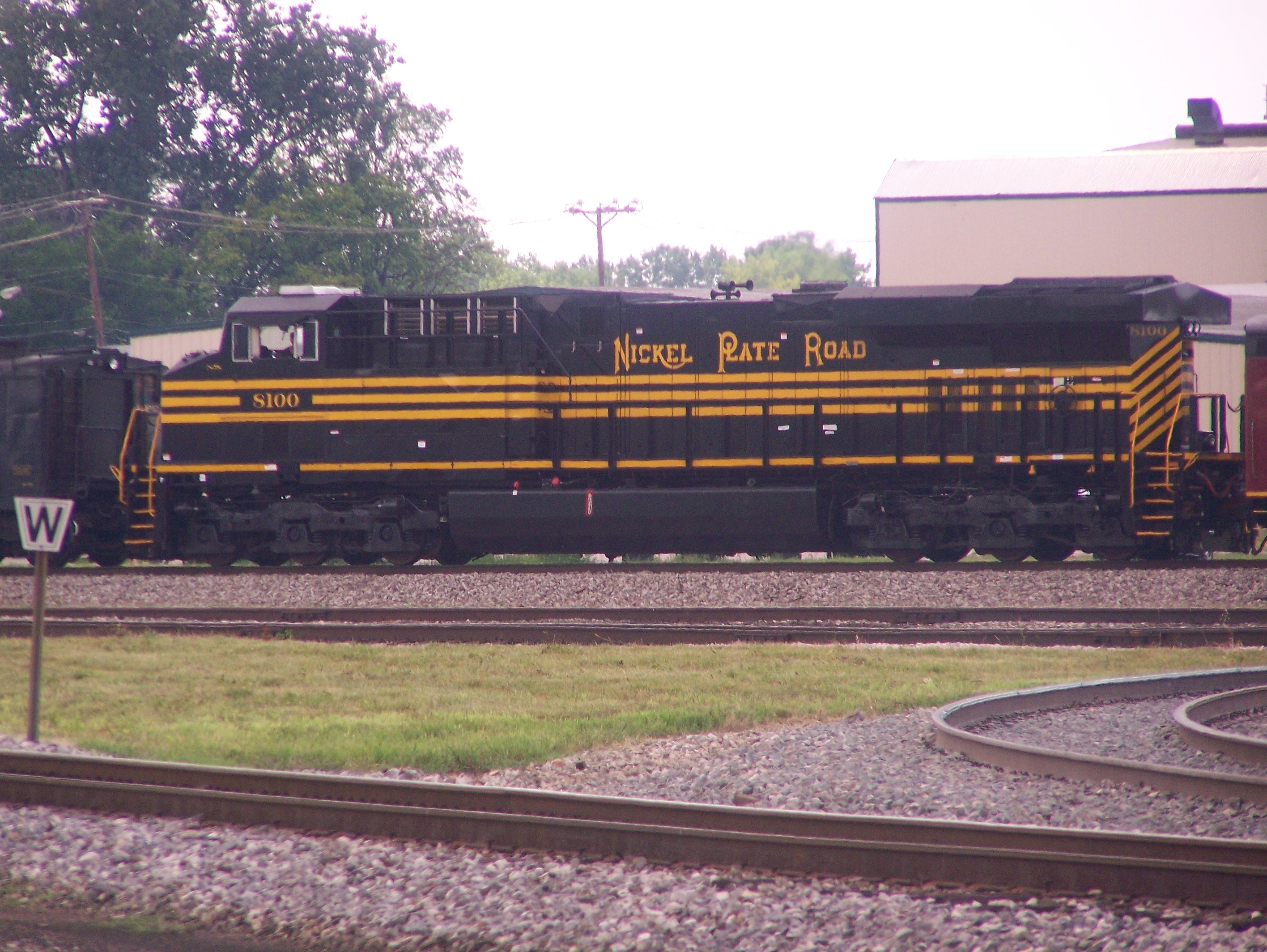
Norfolk Southern ES44AC 8100 in Nickel Plate Road colors on a run with former NKP S-2 Berkshire 765

On March 28, 2012, Norfolk Southern unveiled NS 8100, a GE ES44AC locomotive painted in the paint scheme found on Nickel Plate Road's diesel locomotives. It was the third of twenty units to be painted in the colors of Norfolk Southern's predecessors.

== See also ==
- Nickel Plate Road 190
- Nickel Plate Road 587
- Nickel Plate Road 759
- Nickel Plate Road 763
- Nickel Plate Road 765
- Nickel Plate Road 779
- Nickel Plate Limited
