= Seney Syndicate =

Group of railroads

During 1879 and 1880, the Seney Syndicate linked together several short railroads in Ohio, Indiana, and Illinois to form the Lake Erie and Western Railroad.

The Seney Syndicate was headed by George I. Seney, a New York banker. Eastern members of the Syndicate included the successful speculators John T. Martin, Edward H. R. Lyman, Alexander M. White, and Walston H. Brown.

The westerns members appear to have been dominated by Calvin S. Brice, a 35-year-old Lima, Ohio, attorney who had been instrumental in the formation of the Lake Erie and Western Railroad. Also from Ohio were members Charles Foster, then Governor of Ohio; Dan P. Eells of Cleveland; and General Samuel R. Thomas of Columbus, Ohio.

The members of the Syndicate from Illinois included Columbus R. Cummings and William B. Howard, both men with experience with the construction and the management of railroad properties.

In addition to controlling the Lake Erie and Western Railroad, the Seney Syndicate controlled the 2500-mile East Tennessee, Virginia and Georgia Railroad, the Peoria, Decatur and Evansville Railway and the Ohio Central Railroad. The Ohio Central extended from Toledo, Ohio, to the Hocking Valley coal fields and it crossed the Lake Erie and Western at Fostoria, Ohio.

== Sources ==
- Rehor, John A. (1994). The Nickel Plate story. Kalmbach Publishing Co., Waukesha, WI. ISBN 0-89024-012-4.
