= Globe Locomotive Works =

The Globe Locomotive Works was a late-19th century manufacturer of railroad steam locomotives and other machinery based in Boston, Massachusetts. Founded in 1846, the firm built some one hundred steam locomotives for railroads throughout the United States. From 1849 to 1851, it was operated by John Souther as Globe Works.

In 1864 the company (a joint venture of John Souther and D.A. Pickering) ceased producing locomotives and instead focused on the manufacture of steam shovels.

== Notable Locomotives ==
The "Elephant", a wood-burning type 4-4-0 steam locomotive built to 5' gauge by the Globe Works (Souther) in 1849, was built for a railroad at Norfolk, Virginia and never shipped to them. It was resold in 1850 and shipped around Cape Horn in crates with its arrival in San Francisco in January 1851. The locomotive was modestly used to aid Samuel Brannan's wharf company filling in San Francisco Bay and was nicknamed "Elephant" by the city council. This was the first railroad operation in California, predating both the Arcada and Mad River and Sacramento Valley Railroad. Brannan sold the locomotive in 1856 to the Sacramento Valley Railroad, which widened it to 5' 3.5" gauge and named it the C.K. Garrison in honor of Commodore C.K. Garrison who was the railroad's first president. In 1865, the Sacramento Valley was standard gauged to 4' 8.5" following the purchase of controlling interest by the Central Pacific Railroad. In 1869, the locomotive was rebuilt and regauged at Folsom, and at that time was renamed Pioneer (not to be confused with the 4-2-0 named Pioneer that is preserved in Chicago). Between May and September 1871, it was shopped by the Central Pacific, receiving a new front truck, new stack, and other repairs. The locomotive was believed to be retired in 1879 and scrapped by 1886 at the latest.
