= John Souther =

- Born: March 1, 1816; Boston, Massachusetts
- Died: September 12, 1911 (aged 95); Newton, Massachusetts
- Relatives: Marguerite Souther (granddaughter)

John Souther (March 1, 1816 – September 12, 1911) was the founder of Globe Locomotive Works, an American steam locomotive manufacturing company. In his obituary published in the Newton, Massachusetts, Town Crier, he is credited with designing the pattern for the fence around Boston Common. In 1852 he built the first Tunnel Boring machine using Charles Wilson's Patented design (Nos. 14,483 and 17,650). The machine was tried at the Hoosac Tunnel work but after only 12 feet the steel was not up to the test of grinding rock.

In 1854 Souther built two 4-4-0 locomotives for the Fitchburg Railroad, the Hoosac and the Champion. He also built two 25-horsepower steam shovel for Norman Carmine Munson to use in filling the Boston Back Bay.

On his death in 1911, he was survived by a son and a daughter. Souther attended the funeral on May 4, 1870 of Zerah Colburn, the well-known locomotive engineer and journalist, who for a time (circa 1853) was employed by Souther.
