= Englewood station (Chicago and Western Indiana Railroad) =

Railway station in Chicago

Englewood
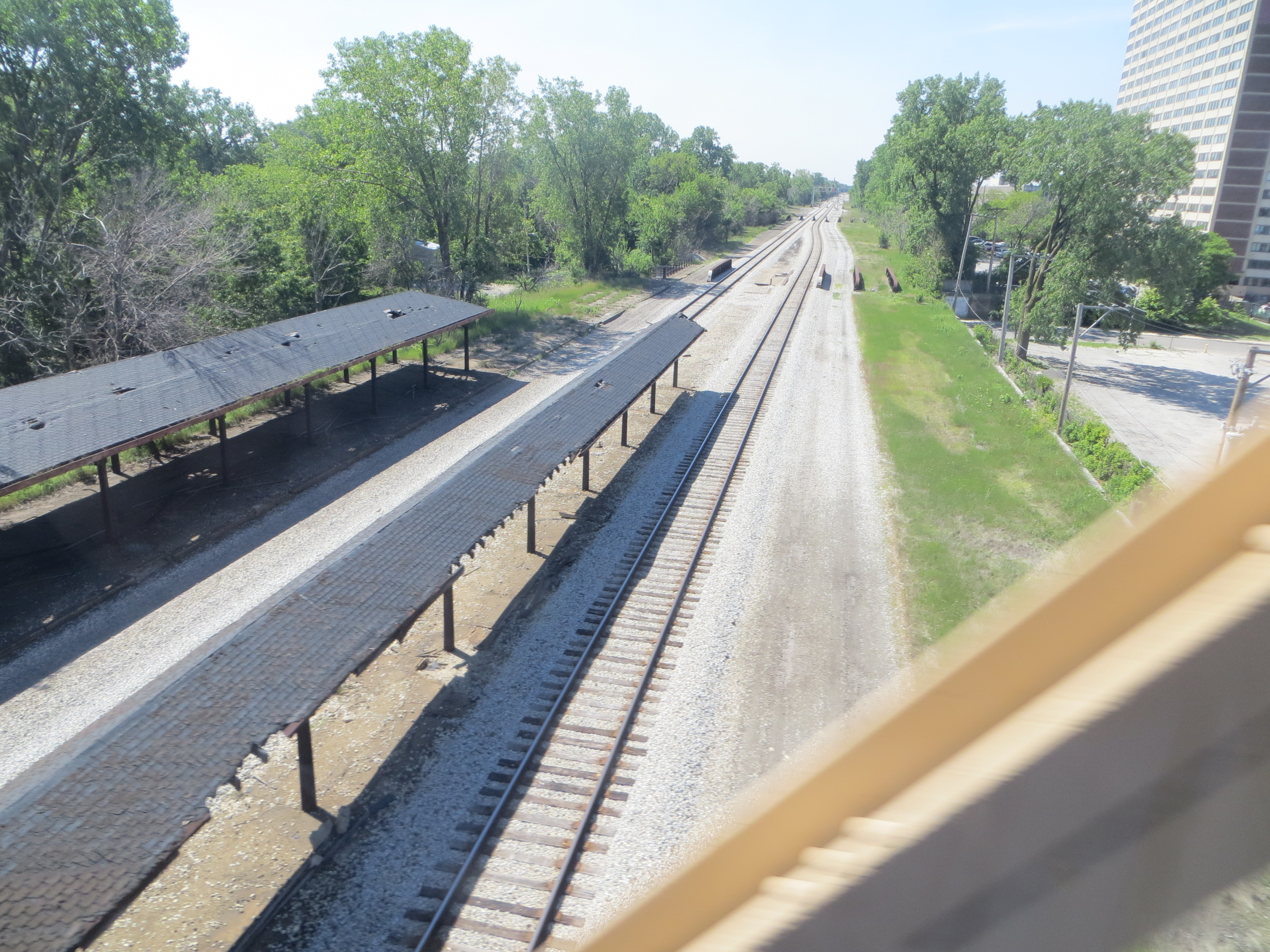
- The abandoned platforms and canopies seen from a Chicago Transit Authority Green Line train in 2013.

General information
- Location: 551 West 63rd Street; Chicago, Illinois
- Coordinates: 41.7798°N 87.6398°W
- Connections: Parnell station: Chicago 'L' (1906–1949)

Other information
- Status: Decommissioned
- Station code: 7315 (Erie Railroad)

History
- Closed: December 13, 1965 (Erie-Lackawanna Railroad); July 29, 1979 (Norfolk & Western)
- Original company: Chicago and Western Indiana Railroad
Former services
Preceding station	Chicago and Western Indiana Railroad	Following station
59th Street toward Chicago	Suburban service	Normal Park toward Dolton
Preceding station	Chicago and Eastern Illinois Railroad	Following station
47th Street toward Chicago	Main Line	Kensington toward Evansville
47th Street toward Chicago	Chicago – St. Louis	Kensington toward St. Louis
Preceding station	Erie Railroad	Following station
47th Street toward Chicago	Main Line	Auburn Park toward Jersey City
Preceding station	Monon Railroad	Following station
47th Street toward Chicago	Main Line	Hammond toward Louisville
Preceding station	Wabash Railroad	Following station
47th Street toward Chicago	Main Line	Landers toward Kansas City
47th Street toward Chicago	Chicago – Buffalo	Landers toward Buffalo
Preceding station	Chesapeake and Ohio Railway	Following station
Chicago Terminus	Chicago, Cincinnati & Louisville Railroad 1911-1925	Hammond toward Cincinnati
Location

Englewood station, commonly referred to as Little Englewood Station, is a former train station in the Englewood neighborhood of Chicago, Illinois. It stood a few blocks west of the larger Englewood Union Station at 63rd and State and served trains operating between Dearborn Station and Indiana. The station served as a stop for the Erie Railroad, Monon Railroad, Wabash Railroad, Chicago and Eastern Illinois Railroad, and Chicago and Western Indiana Railroad. Between 1906 and 1949, interchanges with the rapid transit Englewood branch could be made directly at Parnell station. Chicago and Western Indiana commuter service lasted until 1963. The tracks are in use by Metra's SouthWest Service, but trains do not stop here. The platforms and canopies still exist, although the station building has been demolished.

Four other railroad stations were located on 63rd Street:

- Englewood Union Station (New York Central, Nickel Plate, Pennsylvania, Rock Island)
- Woodlawn (Illinois Central, Michigan Central, Big Four Route, South Shore Line)
- 63rd Street (Baltimore & Ohio / Pere Marquette)
- Chicago Lawn (Grand Trunk Western)
