= Adam's Rib (disambiguation) =

Adam's Rib is a 1949 film starring Spencer Tracy and Katharine Hepburn.

Adam's Rib can also refer to:

- A reference to the biblical story of Adam and Eve
- A common misconception about the number of ribs in the rib cages of men and women
- Adam's Rib (1923 film), a 1923 film directed by Cecil B. DeMille
- Adam's Rib (1991 film), a 1991 Soviet film
- Adam's Rib (album), a 1998 album by Canadian musician Melanie Doane, and the title track
- Adam's Rib (TV series), a short-lived 1973 sitcom based from the 1949 film
- Adam's Rib Ski Area, a proposed ski resort in Eagle County, Colorado, USA

== See also ==
- "Adam's Ribs", a 1974 episode of M*A*S*H
- "Adam's Ribs" (song), a 1993 single by the Australian rock band You Am I
- "Adam’s Rib", 1997 Song by Melanie Doane
