= 47th Street station (Chicago and Western Indiana Railroad) =

47th Street
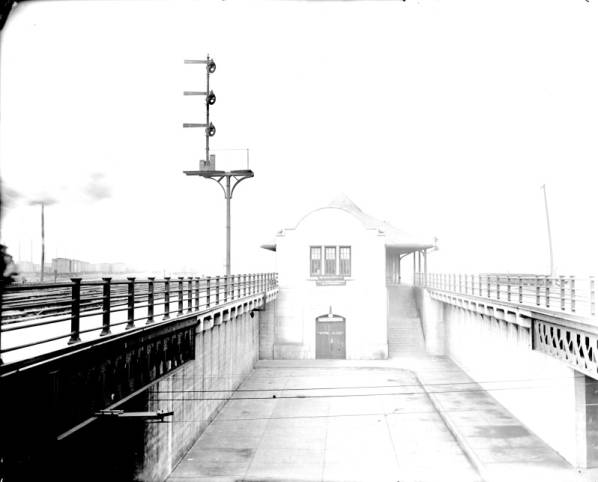
- The former 47th Street station built by the Chicago and Western Indiana Railroad, photographed in 1909 by Erie photographer J.E. Bailey.

General information
- Location: 47th Street (near South Normal Avenue); Fuller Park, Chicago, Illinois
- Coordinates: 41.8097°N 87.6364°W
- Line: Chicago & Western Indiana Railroad Dolton Line
- Platforms: 2 side platofrms
- Tracks: 2

Other information
- Station code: 7319 (Erie Railroad)

History
- Closed: 1935 (Erie); July 26, 1963 (Chicago & Western Indiana); July 29, 1979 (Norfolk & Western)
- Rebuilt: 1909
Former services
| Preceding station | Chicago and Western Indiana Railroad | Following station |
|---|---|---|
| Chicago Terminus | Suburban service | 55th Street toward Dolton |
| Preceding station | Chicago and Eastern Illinois Railroad | Following station |
| Chicago Terminus | Main Line | Englewood toward Evansville |
| Chicago Terminus | Chicago – St. Louis | Englewood toward St. Louis |
| Preceding station | Erie Railroad | Following station |
| Chicago Terminus | Main Line | Englewood toward Jersey City |
| Preceding station | Grand Trunk Western Railroad | Following station |
| Chicago Terminus | Main Line | Chicago Lawn toward Port Huron |
| Chicago Terminus | Suburban Service (Chicago) | Halsted Street toward Valparaiso |
| Preceding station | Monon Railroad | Following station |
| Chicago Terminus | Main Line | Englewood toward Louisville |
| Preceding station | Wabash Railroad | Following station |
| Englewood toward Kansas City | Main Line | Chicago Terminus |
| Chicago Terminus | Chicago – Buffalo | Englewood toward Buffalo |
| Preceding station | Chesapeake and Ohio Railway | Following station |
| Chicago Terminus | Chicago, Cincinnati & Louisville Railroad 1911-1925 | Englewood toward Cincinnati |
| Preceding station | Norfolk and Western Railway | Following station |
| Chicago Terminus | Orland Park Cannonball | Halsted–75th toward Orland Park |
Location

47th Street station was a commuter rail station of the Chicago and Western Indiana Railroad on the south side of Chicago.

The depot at 47th Street was a two-story stone structure that was directly between two sets of merging tracks, with platforms on both sides. Passenger service on Chicago and Western Indiana Railroad ended in 1963, and the station closed on July 29, 1979 when the Norfolk and Western Railway (ex-Wabash Railroad) bypassed the station. The station structure remained long after passenger service had ended, with the structure being removed in the 1990s.

== History ==
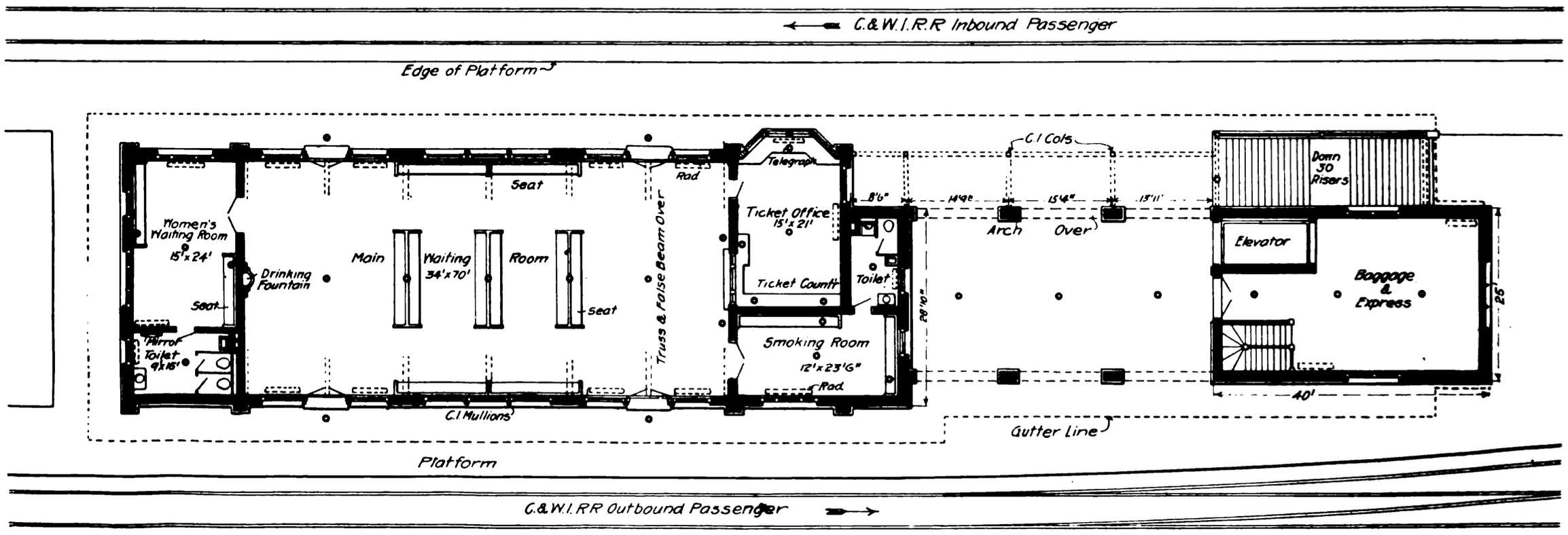
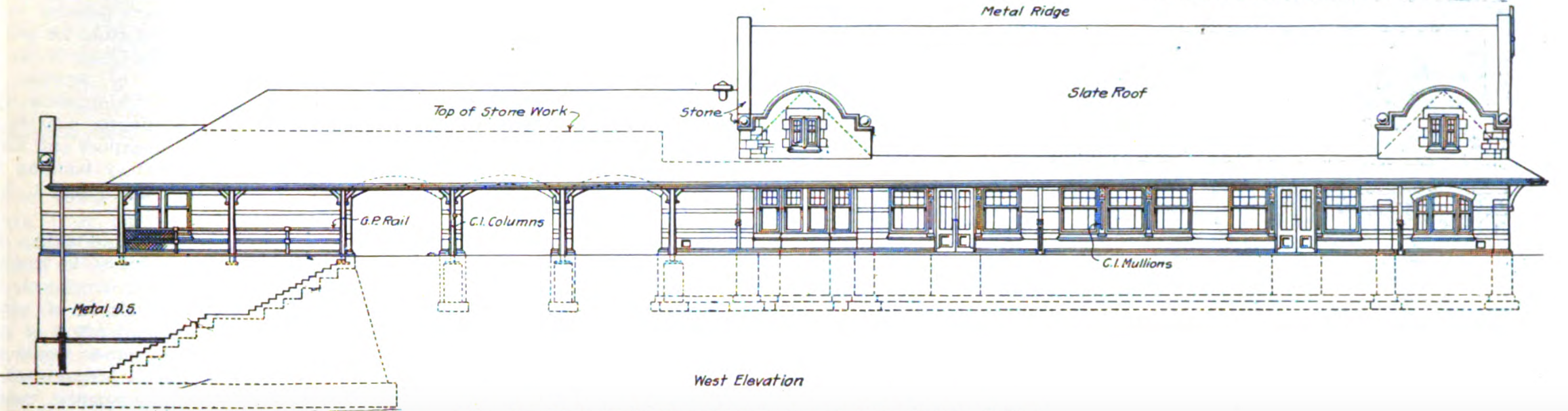
Floorplan (top) and side view (bottom) diagrams of 47th Street station, 1906

This station replaced an at-grade station on the south side of 47th Street. The station waiting room was 30 by 70 feet, constructed with Bedford lime stone with a slate roof. The Erie Railroad skipped this station after September 29, 1935.

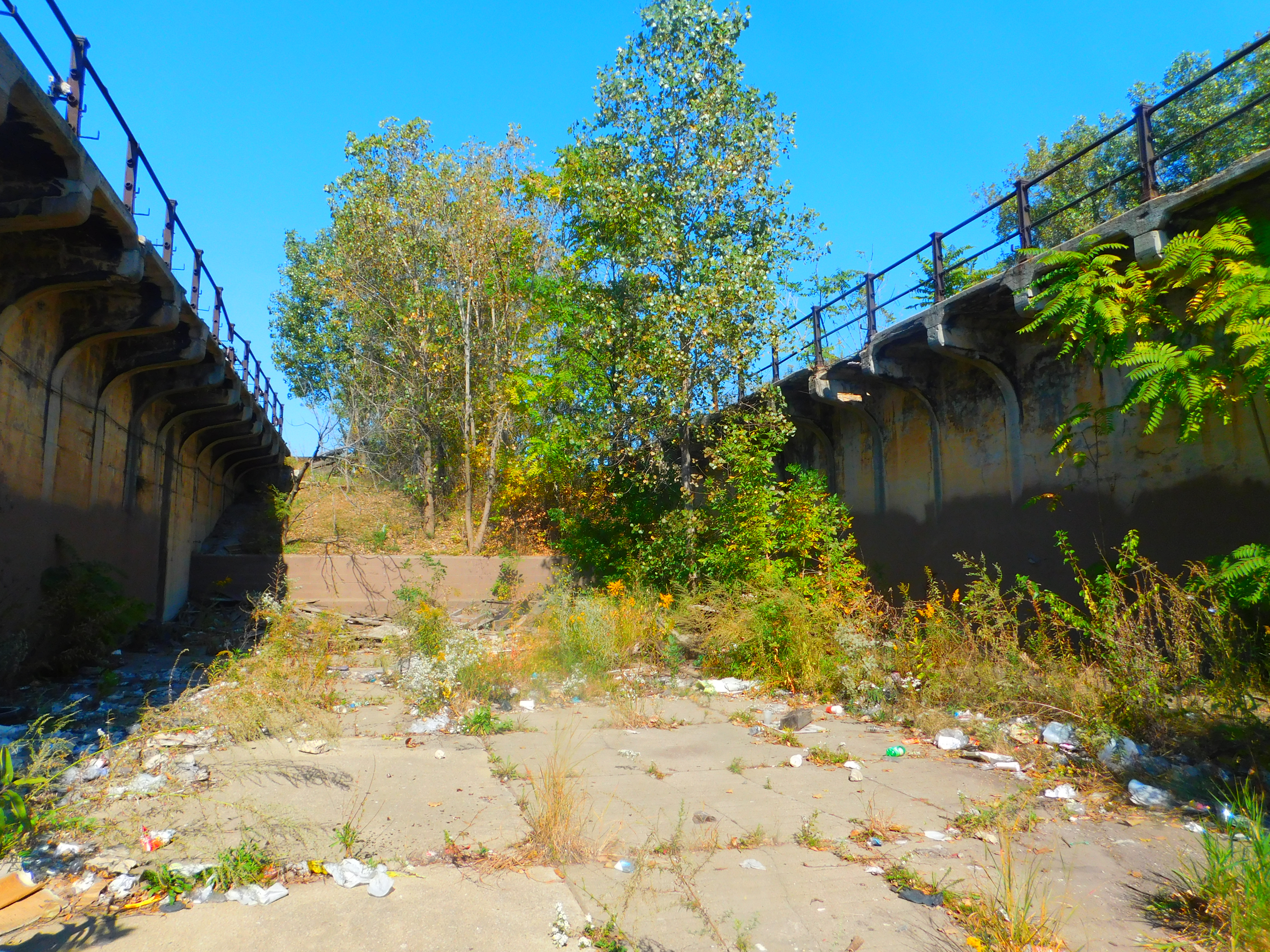
47th Street station site in October 2015
