= Chicago Union Station Company =

Overview
- Headquarters: Chicago
- Reporting mark: CUST
- Locale: Chicago
- Dates of operation: 1925–2017

Technical
- Track gauge: 4 ft 8 1/2 in (1,435 mm) standard gauge

The Chicago Union Station Company (reporting mark CUST) was a wholly owned subsidiary of Amtrak that owned Chicago's Union Station, the largest intercity station in the Midwest, as well as the approach tracks. It was originally owned equally by four companies—the Pittsburgh, Fort Wayne and Chicago Railway and Pittsburgh, Cincinnati, Chicago and St. Louis Railroad (two Pennsylvania Railroad subsidiaries), the Chicago, Burlington and Quincy Railroad (Burlington Route), and the Chicago, Milwaukee, St. Paul and Pacific Railroad (Milwaukee Road)—and has been wholly owned by Amtrak since 1984. In 2017, the Chicago Union Station Company was dissolved into Amtrak.

== History ==
The Union Station Company was incorporated July 3, 1913, and organized November 19, 1913, to replace the old union station on the same spot. On May 7, 1915, the company was renamed to the Chicago Union Station Company. The station was opened May 16, 1925; viaduct construction for cross streets lasted into 1927.

The connection with the PFW&C was at the south end of the CUS trackage at the Roosevelt Road crossing. The north end of CUS trackage is at the curve near Kinzie Street, west of which the PCC&StL and CM&StP shared trackage to a split at Western Avenue. At the Roosevelt Road crossing, the tracks of the CB&Q split to the west, turning west just after crossing under the St. Charles Air Line Railroad. A fifth line—the Chicago and Alton Railroad—merged with the PFW&C line at Alton Junction and used Union Station, admitted on September 18, 1915.

The last Pennsylvania Railroad train into the north side of Union Station (via the PCC&StL) ran April 23, 1927; afterwards, PRR passenger service ran out the south side and the PFW&C, using the South Chicago and Southern Railroad to reach the PCC&StL.

Buildings were gradually built over the sunken approach tracks using leased air rights.

A new connection at Englewood Union Station was completed October 15, 1971, allowing trains on the Chicago, Rock Island and Pacific Railroad to run over the PFW&C to Union Station instead of to LaSalle Street Station. This was never used by passenger trains, as the dying Rock Island decided to continue using LaSalle, and Metra's Rock Island District commuter trains still use that same route.

The CM&StP became the Chicago, Milwaukee, St. Paul and Pacific Railroad in 1928. Their approach trackage, shared with the PCC&StL, has since been acquired by Metra. The CB&Q and its approach became part of Burlington Northern Railroad in 1970, and is now part of the BNSF Railway. The PFW&C trackage is now owned by Norfolk Southern (transferred from Conrail in 1999).

Amtrak acquired the outstanding shares held by BN and the Milwaukee Road in 1984, having earlier acquired the stake held by what had become Penn Central. Amtrak also owns former PFW&C trackage from Roosevelt Road south to Alton Junction (21st Street), including their 14th Street Maintenance Facility.

In May 2017, the Chicago Union Station company dissolved, with its assets now being owned directly by Amtrak.
