= Chicago Lawn station =

Railroad station in Chicago, Illinois, U.S.

Chicago Lawn
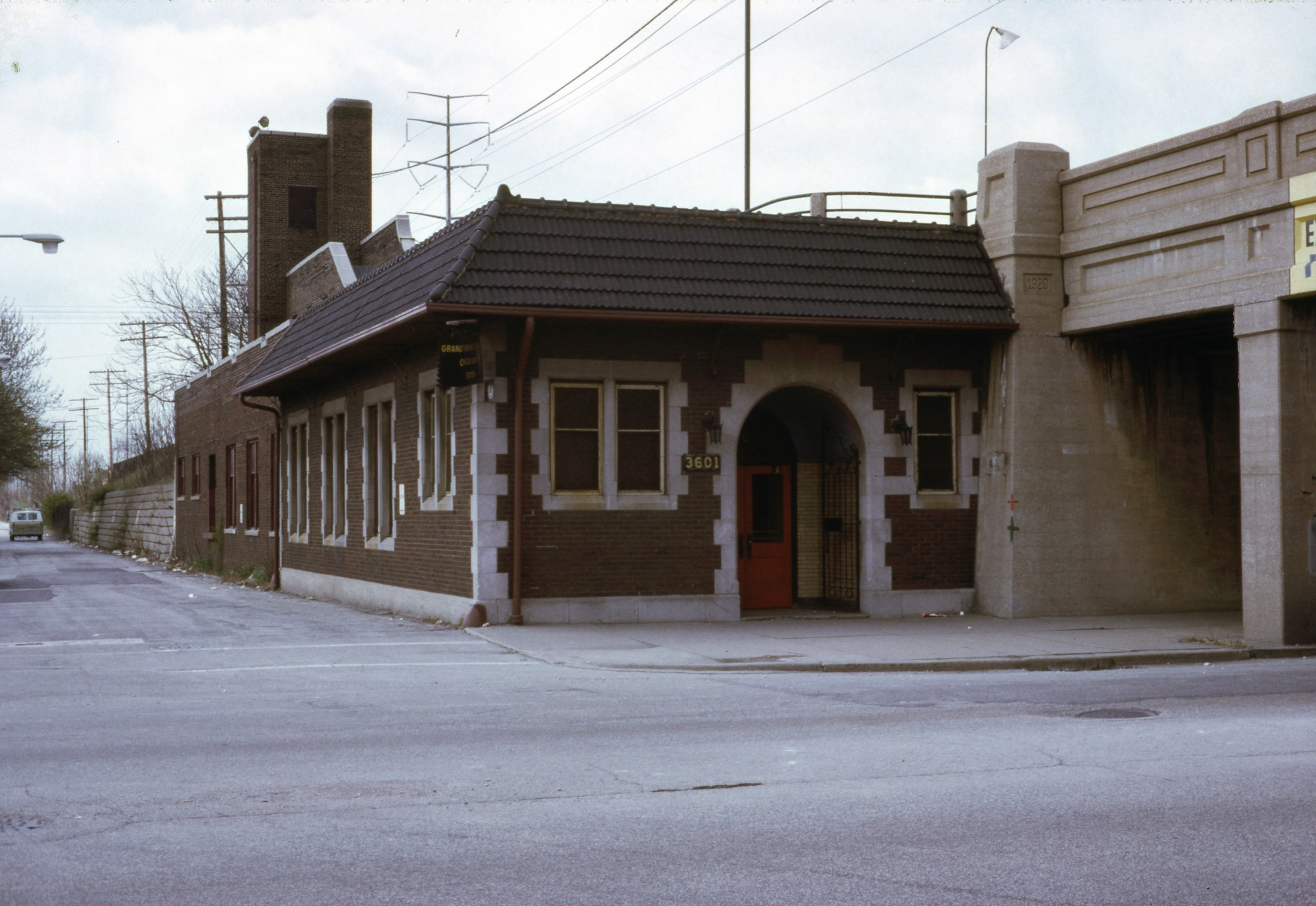
- Chicago Lawn station in 1971

General information
- Location: 3601 63rd Street; Chicago, Illinois
- Coordinates: 41.77861°N 87.71282°W
- Operator: Grand Trunk Western Railroad
- Line: CSX Elsdon Subdivision
- Platforms: 1
- Tracks: 2

History
- Closed: April 30, 1971

Key dates
- Tracks elevated: 1929
- Demolished: August 2017

Former services
Preceding station	Grand Trunk Western Railroad	Following station
47th Street toward Chicago	Main Line	Harvey toward Port Huron
59th Street toward Chicago	Suburban Service (Chicago)	Marquette Park toward Valparaiso
Location

Chicago Lawn, also signed as Chicago Lawn-63rd St., was a former railroad station on the border of Chicago Lawn and West Lawn in Chicago, Illinois. The tracks adjacent to the station were elevated over 63rd Street in 1929. Service to the station remained until April 30, 1971, when the eastbound International Limited and westbound Inter-City Limited passenger trains were replaced by Amtrak services on May 1, 1971. The station building was demolished in 2017.

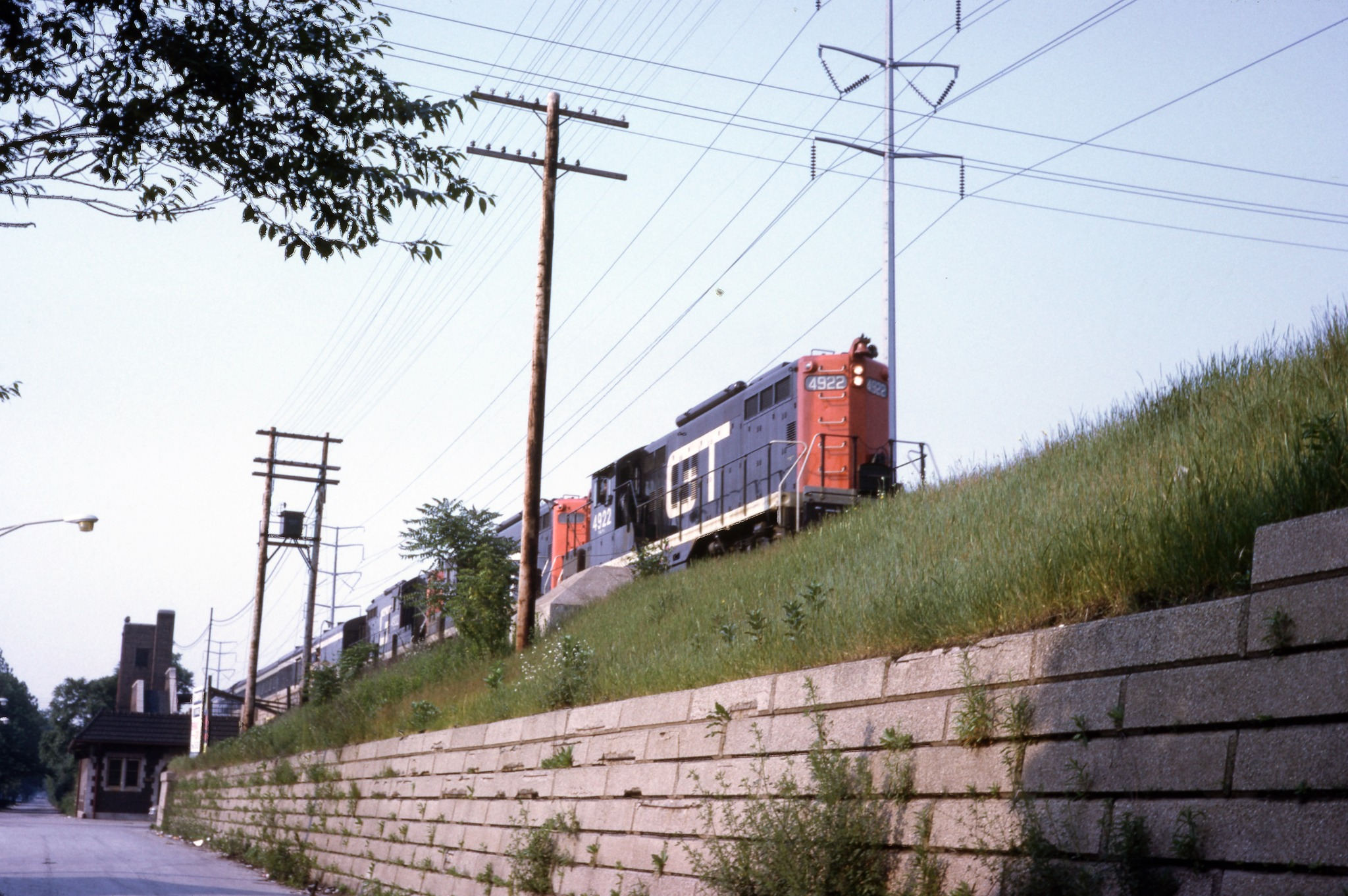
The Dearborn-bound Inter-City Limited in July 1970

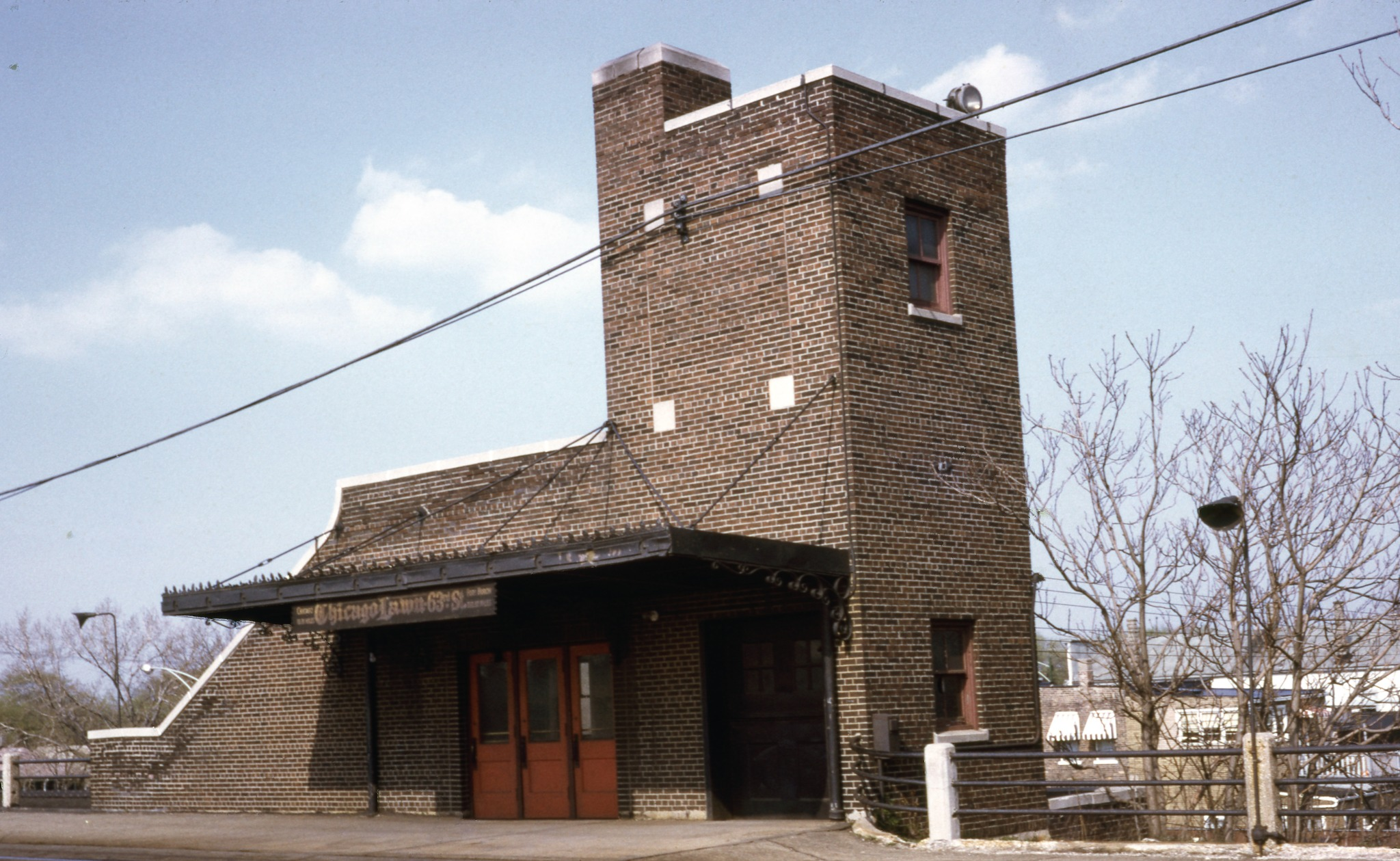
Station platform in 1971, signage displays station name as "Chicago Lawn-63rd St."
