= Adam's Ribs =

- M*A*S*H episode
- Episode no.: Season 3 Episode 11
- Directed by: Gene Reynolds
- Written by: Laurence Marks
- Production code: B316
- Original air date: November 26, 1974

Guest appearances
- Joseph Stern; Basil Hoffman; Jeff Maxwell

Episode chronology
← Previous "There Is Nothing Like a Nurse"	Next → "A Full Rich Day"
- M*A*S*H season 3

"Adam's Ribs" is the eleventh episode of the third season of M*A*S*H, and fifty-ninth overall. The episode premiered November 26, 1974, on CBS.

== Overview ==
Fed up with being offered the same meal choices (liver or fish) for 11 days in a row, Hawkeye snaps and causes a public spectacle in the mess tent. Henry is not happy about the incident, but admits that the food situation has gotten repetitive and is trying to remedy it. However, his attempt to have frozen turkey shipped to the camp has failed due to a bureaucratic mix-up.

Hawkeye decides that what he most wants is barbecued spareribs, and remembers the delicious ribs that he had at a restaurant in Chicago. He cannot recall its name, only that it was near the Dearborn Street train station. Henry gives him the telephone number for the station; later that night, Hawkeye has Radar put a call through so he can get the name - "Adam's Ribs." He orders 40 pounds of ribs and a gallon of barbecue sauce, but he and Trapper find themselves at a loss as to how to have them delivered to the 4077th. After they try unsuccessfully to persuade Klinger to have one of his relatives ship the order, Trapper remembers a woman he once knew in Chicago. He calls her and persuades her to pick up the order and put it on a plane, labeled as medical supplies bound for South Korea.

The order arrives at the supply depot, but regulations prevent it from being delivered to the camp. Hawkeye and Trapper visit the depot and negotiate with a stubborn supply sergeant who lives not far from Chicago who, once told what is being shipped, immediately guesses that the food is from Adam's Ribs. Once they tell him what the order is, he agrees to release it in exchange for a portion of the ribs and sauce, although he is disappointed that Hawkeye forgot to order any coleslaw.

Back at camp, Hawkeye, Trapper, Henry, Radar and Klinger prepare to enjoy a meal of spareribs, but are interrupted by a fresh batch of incoming wounded. Hawkeye protests vehemently as Trapper and Henry pull him away from the table to get ready for surgery, without having taken a single bite.

== Behind the scenes ==
The episode is distinguished by the absence of both Maj. Frank Burns (Larry Linville) and Maj. Margaret Houlihan (Loretta Swit).

The rib restaurant discussed in the episode is not based on any specific Chicago restaurant. As Larry Gelbart explained, "Part of it had to do with the city's 'hog butcher for the world' reputation, but it principally was just a concept, a loving homage, to a place that I can never forget." While the Dearborn Street station is a real place, the region surrounding it was primarily industrial during the 1950s. Henry Blake also mentions having visited the station frequently owing to his Illinois background.

One Chicago restaurant, Cy's Crabhouse, did rename itself Adam's Rib and Ale House in 2008 in order to help business.

The man at the station Hawkeye speaks to is Bernard Reznik. In Czech "reznik" means butcher. Hawkeye identifies himself to Bernard as a reporter named Cranston Lamont, which is a play on the name Lamont Cranston, the alter ego of The Shadow.

The Supply Sergeant makes the mistake of pronouncing Joliet as Jolly-et, a mistake a person from Joliet would not make. (An antiquated law, still on the books, actually prohibits such a pronunciation and establishes Joe-lee-ET as the correct pronunciation).
