= Chicago and Western Indiana Railroad =

Railroad in the US

Overview
- Reporting mark: CWI
- Locale: Chicago, IL area
- Dates of operation: 1880–
- Successor: Split between Union Pacific Railroad, Norfolk Southern Railroad, Chicago Rail Link and Belt Railway of Chicago

Technical
- Track gauge: 4 ft 8 1/2 in (1,435 mm) standard gauge

All lines operating into Dearborn Station, except for the Santa Fe, travelled over the C&WI

The Chicago and Western Indiana Railroad (reporting mark CWI) was the owner of Dearborn Station in Chicago and the trackage leading to it. It was owned equally by five of the railroads using it to reach the terminal, and kept those companies from needing their own lines into the city. With the closure of Dearborn Station in 1971 and the Calumet steel mills in 1985, the railroad was gradually downgraded until 1994 when it became a subsidiary of the Union Pacific Corporation.

== History ==
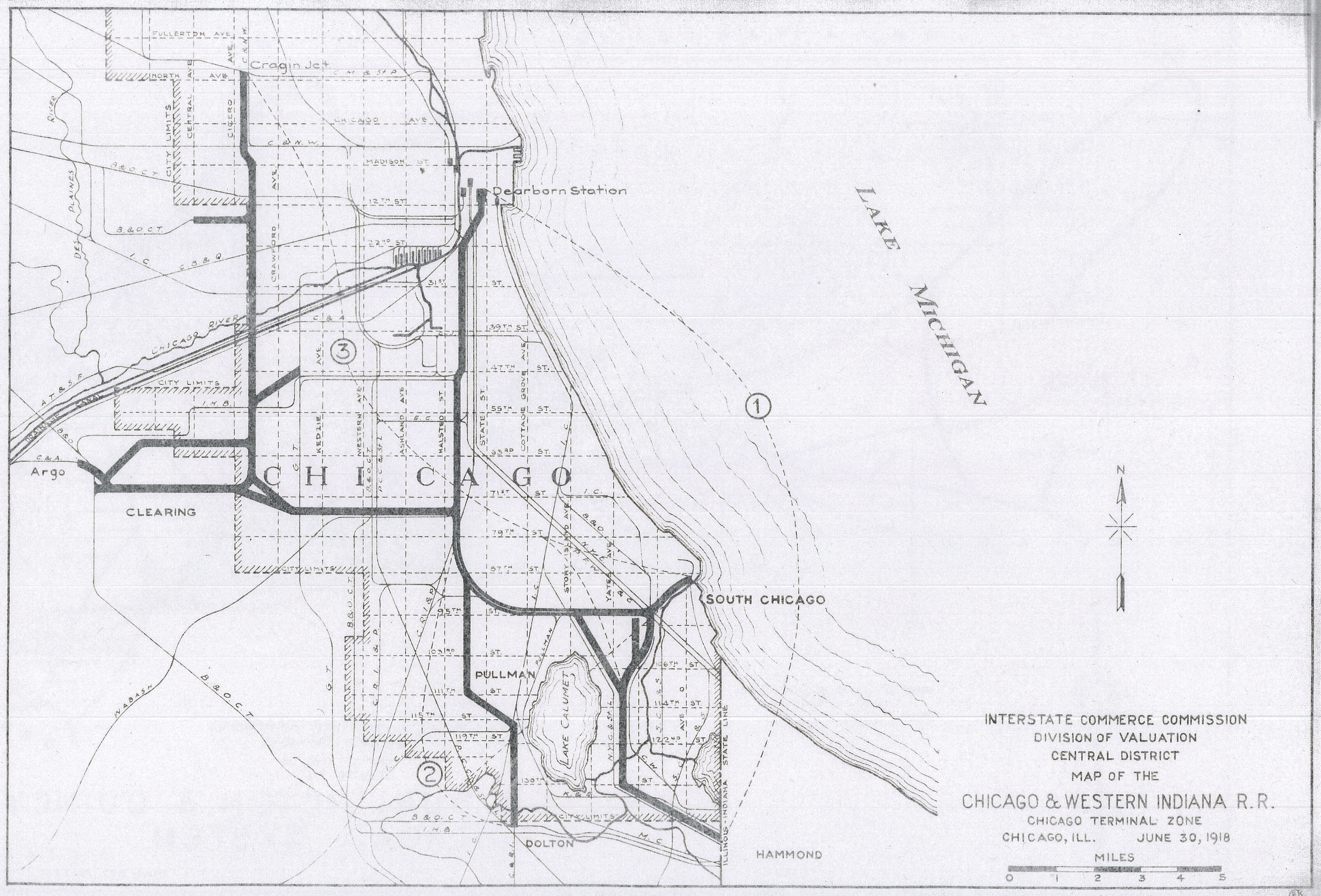
1918 map of the railroad

The C&WI was chartered June 5, 1879, and soon opened a line in May 1880, from Dolton, where the Chicago and Eastern Illinois Railroad merged with the Columbus, Chicago and Indiana Central Railway, north to Dearborn Station on the south side of the Chicago Loop. The alignment ran north from Dolton to the crossing of the Illinois Central Railroad just south of its junction with the Michigan Central Railroad at Kensington, then continued northwest and north, eventually coming along the west side of the Pittsburgh, Fort Wayne and Chicago Railway (PRR) at 47th Street. Then it continued north to cross the PFW&C and head northeast at Alton Junction, crossing the St. Charles Air Line Railroad and Chicago, Rock Island and Pacific Railway before turning back north the rest of the way to Dearborn Station.

Connections were immediately provided with the newly built Wabash, St. Louis and Pacific Railway at 74th Street and Chicago and Grand Trunk Railway at 49th Street, which, along with the Chicago and Eastern Illinois Railroad connection at the south end at Dolton, were the three initial lessees of the line.

Soon after, the Chicago and Western Indiana Belt Railway and South Chicago and Western Indiana Railroad were merged into the C&WI on January 26, 1882. Several more lines were built using their charters — a branch from the main line at 74th Street, west and north to the Chicago, Milwaukee and St. Paul Railway at Cragin, a branch from 87th Street east to various connections at South Chicago, and a branch of that line from Pullman Junction south and southeast, parallel to and east of the New York, Chicago and St. Louis Railway, to just shy of State Line Junction in Hammond, Indiana. At Hammond two more connections were made — the Chicago, Indianapolis and Louisville Railway (Monon) and the Chicago and Atlantic Railway (Erie). Those two companies also acquired shares in the C&WI, bringing the total to five. The State Line and Indiana City Railroad later gave the Wabash, St. Louis and Pacific Railway a second access point to the C&WI at Hammond, and a sixth railroad — the Atchison, Topeka and Santa Fe Railway — used Dearborn Station, but used its own line on the east side of the C&EI from Alton Junction to the station.

The branches to Cragin and South Chicago (the latter east of Hammond Junction only) were leased in 1883 to the newly formed Belt Railway of Chicago, which was also given trackage rights over the C&WI's main line and branch to Hammond Junction. The C&WI continued to operate its main line from Dearborn Station south to 87th Street, where it split into two lines to Dolton and Hammond.

The Chicago and Western Indiana Railroad operated an extensive number of interlocking towers on its system. From the north, towers were as follows: 12th Street tower, 15th Street tower, 16th Street tower, 21st Street tower, 40th Street tower, 47th Street tower, Ford Street tower (59th Street), 74th Street tower, 81st Street tower, Oakdale (later remote controlled by 81st Street), Pullman Junction, South Deering (112th St., later remote controlled from Main Line Drawbridge), Main Line Drawbridge and the famous State Line tower, which was North America's largest interlocking controlled by strong-arm mechanical levers. Pullman Junction was not a conventional interlocked junction, although there was a small interlocking machine for the signals protecting the C&WI-BRC junction there. The crossings were protected by gates and tilting targets. All trains were required to stop. Switchtenders were located at Dearborn Station, 31st Street, 80th Street and Pullman Junction.

The modest commuter service between Chicago and Dolton was discontinued on July 26, 1963. However, the railroad remained the terminal switcher for the remaining carriers using Dearborn Station.

== After Dearborn Station (1971–1994) ==
Dearborn Station closed in 1971 when Amtrak consolidated all long-distance passenger service to Chicago Union Station. All station tracks had been removed and only the headhouse remained by May 1976. The land was later redeveloped as an urban park and residential area called Dearborn Park, and the station was redeveloped as a commercial space. The old C&WI from Alton Junction as far south the junction with Norfolk Southern Railway at 74th Street is now owned by Metra and used by their SouthWest Service. This service is the successor to the single pair of suburban trains operated by the Wabash (and later Norfolk and Western Railroad) over the C&WI. The service moved from the Dearborn Station annex to Union Station in 1976 via a connection at Alton Junction (21st Street) interlocking.

Centralized traffic control was introduced in 1973, combining 40th Street and 47th Street, later 59th Street and 74th Street, a four-tower combination was operated by the train dispatcher located at 47th Street tower after their relocation from Dearborn station. The C&WI also had their own police department, and their officers were designated special agents and police-certified through the Illinois Department of Law Enforcement. The C&WI was one of the first railroads in the late 1940s to completely switch over to diesel locomotives.

From 80th Street to Dolton, the line is now owned by the Union Pacific Railroad, which also has the former Chicago and Eastern Illinois Railroad south from Dolton. The former Main Line segment from 81st Street to 110th Street is owned and operated by Norfolk Southern. NS also relocated the former NKP main tracks to the old C&WI right of way from 130th Street to Burnham when the Mixing Center for Ford Motor Company was built on the former NKP right of way. The rest has been abandoned, except for a short piece in South Deering now used by the Chicago Rail Link, and the part used by the Belt Railway of Chicago, now owned by the BRC.
