= Alton Junction =

Coordinates: 41°51′14″N 87°38′13″W

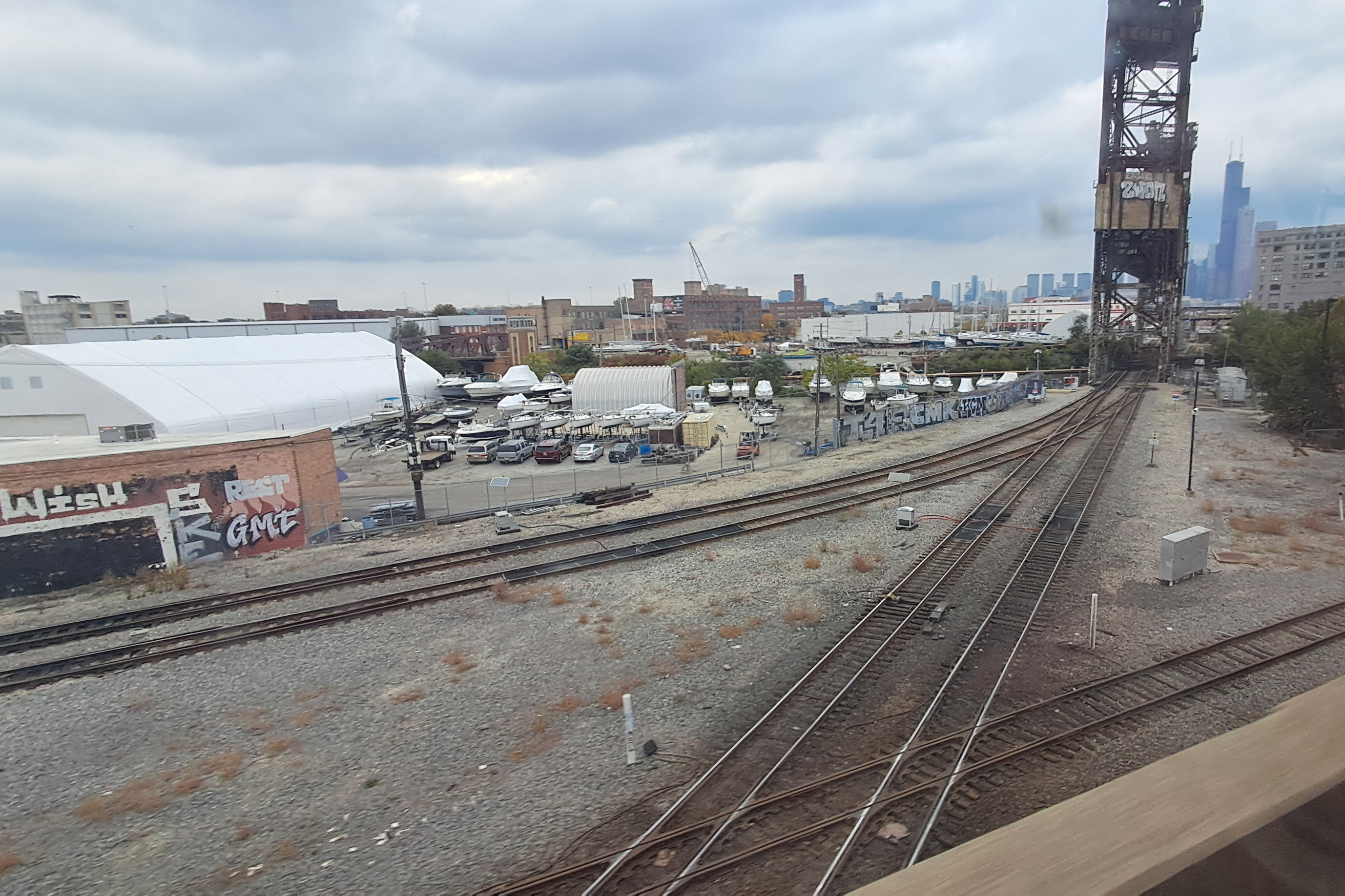
21st Street Crossing, taken from the Orange Line

The Alton Junction, more commonly known as the 21st Street Crossing, is a historically significant rail location in Chicago, Illinois. The junction can be found just east of Canal Street and north of Cermak Road near Chicago's Chinatown. It is located just south of the Canal Street railroad bridge, a massive vertical-lift bridge that spans the South Branch of the Chicago River and serves as the southern approach to Chicago Union Station. While a significant amount of rail traffic still traverses this interlock every day, the junction was substantially larger, as it fed rail traffic not only into Union Station, but also the now-repurposed Dearborn Station. At its peak, the junction contained 26 diamonds to control over 150 trains using the crossing, now reduced to only five. The adjacent Ping Tom Memorial Park occupies the former right of way which served Dearborn Station.

The north–south line is the former Pennsylvania Railroad (Pittsburgh, Fort Wayne & Chicago) mainline, which is now owned and operated by Amtrak as the southern gateway to the Union Station complex. The Norfolk Southern's Chicago Line and the former BNSF Southern Transcon terminate at the southern entrance to the interlocking, but both NS and Burlington Northern Santa Fe trains have trackage rights over the bridge to access the BNSF east–west main line north of the river. All of Amtrak's East Coast bound and Michigan trains use this southern track through the junction. The east-west line, now owned by Canadian National Railway, was originally owned by the Illinois Central and was the carrier's route out of its Central Station to Iowa. A connection between the southern line to the east-west line, originally built by the Alton Railroad and the namesake for the location, now connects Amtrak's Texas Eagle and Lincoln Service to St. Louis.

Alton Junction was controlled by a manned interlocking tower until 2005 when Amtrak transferred control to its new Chicago Terminal control center. Known as 21st Street tower, its operators handled movements through the busy plant using a US&S Model 14 electro-pneumatic interlocking machine. In its final years 21st St took remote control of the closed NYC Clark St tower on the joint NYC/CRI&P tracks at 16th Street.
