= Dearborn Station =

Former train station in Chicago, Illinois

Chicago Dearborn Station
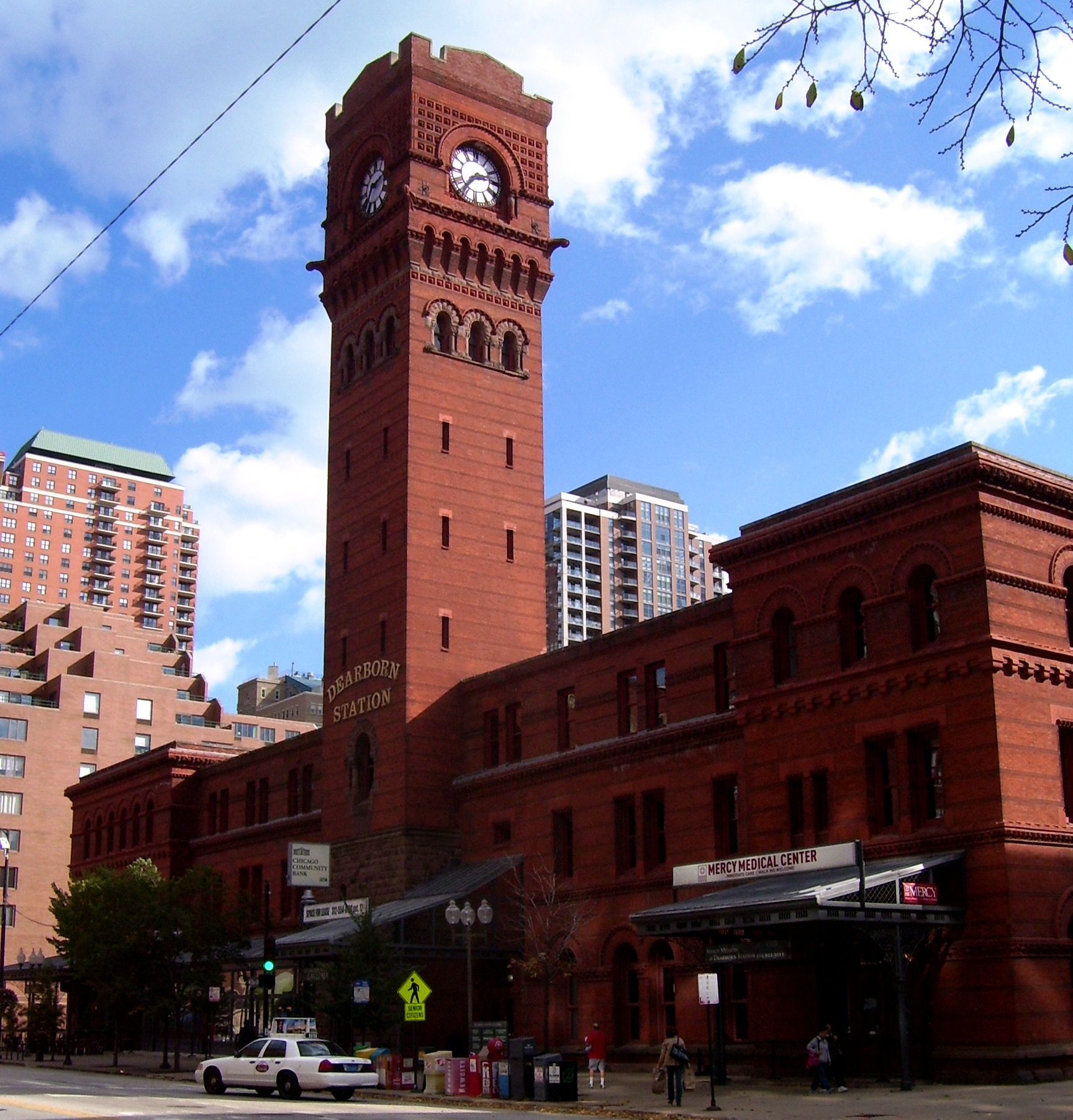
- Dearborn Station head house, 2006

General information
- Location: 47 West Polk Street; Chicago, Illinois
- Coordinates: 41°52′19.78″N 87°37′45″W

History
- Opened: May 8, 1885
- Closed: April 30, 1971 (long-distance service); 1976 (Orland Park Cannonball)

Former services
| Preceding station | Chicago and Western Indiana Railroad | Following station |
|---|---|---|
| Terminus | Suburban service | 47th Street toward Dolton |
| Preceding station | Atchison, Topeka and Santa Fe Railway | Following station |
| Nerska toward Los Angeles | Main Line | Terminus |
| Preceding station | Chicago and Eastern Illinois Railroad | Following station |
| Terminus | Main Line | 47th Street toward Evansville |
| Terminus | Chicago – St. Louis | 47th Street toward St. Louis |
| Preceding station | Erie Railroad | Following station |
| Terminus | Main Line | 47th Street toward Jersey City |
| Preceding station | Grand Trunk Western Railroad | Following station |
| Terminus | Main Line | 47th Street toward Port Huron |
| Terminus | Suburban Service (Chicago) | 47th Street toward Valparaiso |
| Preceding station | Monon Railroad | Following station |
| Terminus | Main Line | 47th Street toward Louisville |
| Preceding station | Wabash Railroad | Following station |
| Terminus | Main Line | 47th Street toward Kansas City |
| Terminus | Chicago – Buffalo | 47th Street toward Buffalo |
| Preceding station | Chesapeake and Ohio Railway | Following station |
| Terminus | Chicago, Cincinnati & Louisville Railroad 1910-1925 | Englewood toward Cincinnati |
- Dearborn Station
- U.S. National Register of Historic Places
- Chicago Landmark
- Interactive map of Dearborn Station
- Built: 1883; 143 years ago
- Architect: Cyrus L. W. Eidlitz
- Architectural style: Romanesque Revival
- NRHP reference No.: 76000688

Significant dates
- Added to NRHP: March 26, 1976; 50 years ago
- Designated CHICL: March 2, 1982
Location

All lines operating into Dearborn Station, except for the Santa Fe, travelled over the C&WI's

Dearborn Station (also called Polk Street Depot) was, beginning in the late 1800s, one of six intercity train stations serving downtown Chicago, Illinois. It remained in operation until May 1, 1971. Built in 1883, it is located at Dearborn and Polk Streets, adjacent to Printers Row in South Loop. The station was owned by the Chicago & Western Indiana Railroad, which itself was owned by the companies operating over its line. The station building headhouse now houses office, retail, and entertainment spaces, and its trackage yard and train sheds, behind the headhouse, were removed and redeveloped into part of the Dearborn Park neighborhood.

== Description and history ==
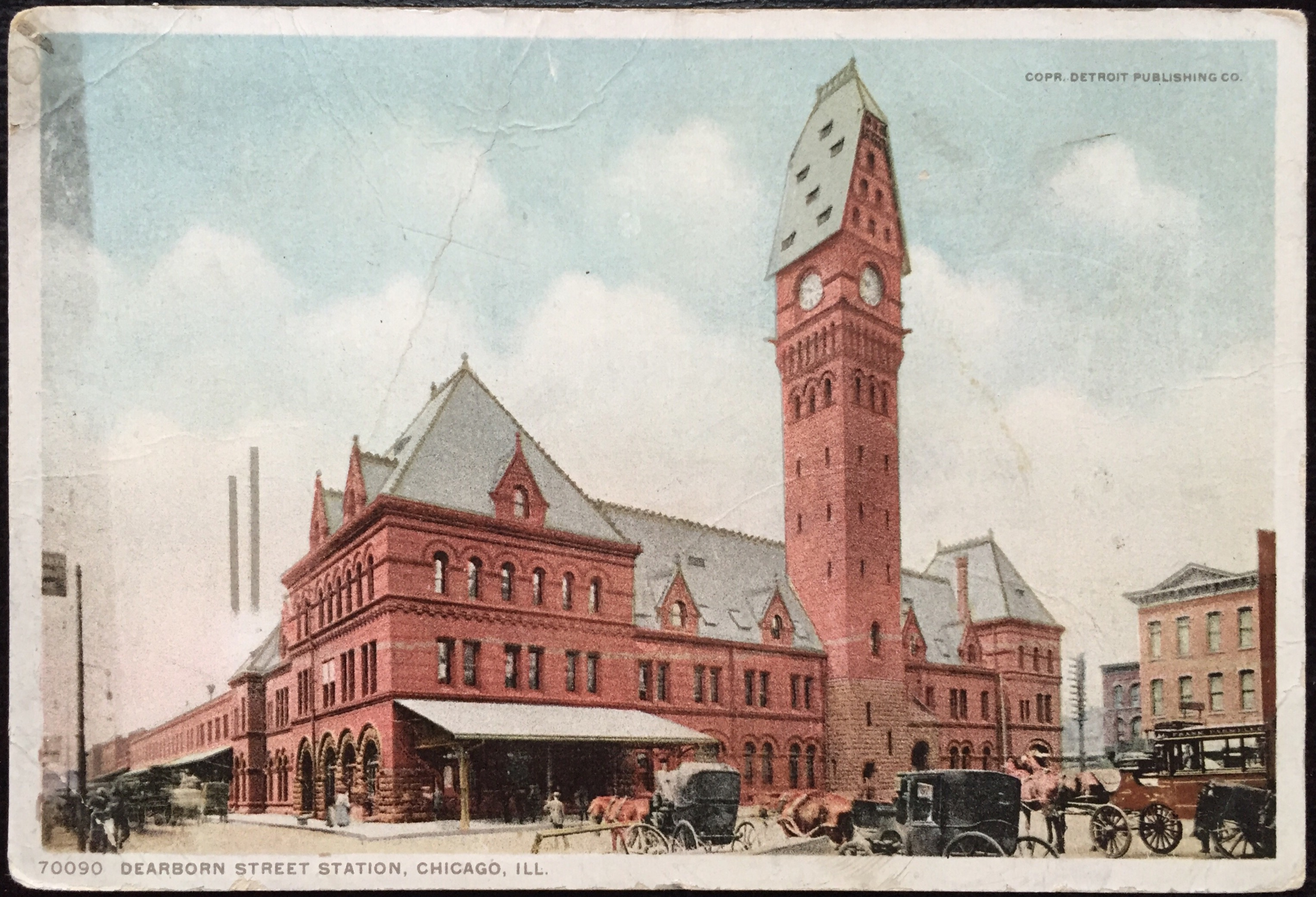
Postcard of Dearborn Station (1885) as it appeared c. 1907. Originally, the headhouse had a steeped pitch roof story, which was eliminated during reconstruction following a fire in 1922. The train sheds over the tracks are pictured to the back.

The Romanesque Revival structure, designed by Cyrus L. W. Eidlitz, opened in 1885 at a cost of $400 to $500 thousand (equivalent to $14.3 to $17.9 million in 2025). The three-story building's exterior walls and twelve-story clock tower were composed of pink granite and red pressed brick topped by a number of steeply pitched roofs. Modifications to the structure following a fire in 1922 included eliminating the original pitched roof profile. Behind the head house were the train platforms, shielded by a large train shed. Inside the station were ticket counters, waiting rooms, and Fred Harvey Company restaurants.

Amtrak (the National Railroad Passenger Corporation) chose to consolidate its Chicago operations at the Union Station. The final intercity passenger train to depart Dearborn Station was the Grand Trunk Western Railroad's International Limited, which departed on April 30, 1971. The arrival of the Atchison, Topeka & Santa Fe Railway's San Francisco Chief and Grand Canyon from California on May 2 brought intercity operations at Dearborn to a close. The Norfolk & Western Railway's Orland Park commuter service, the Orland Park Cannonball, continued to use a platform at Dearborn until 1976.

By 1976, Dearborn Station's train shed was demolished and tracks were removed; the head house building was retained. The train station stood abandoned into the mid-1980s when it was converted to retail and office space. The former rail yards were converted for use as Dearborn Park.

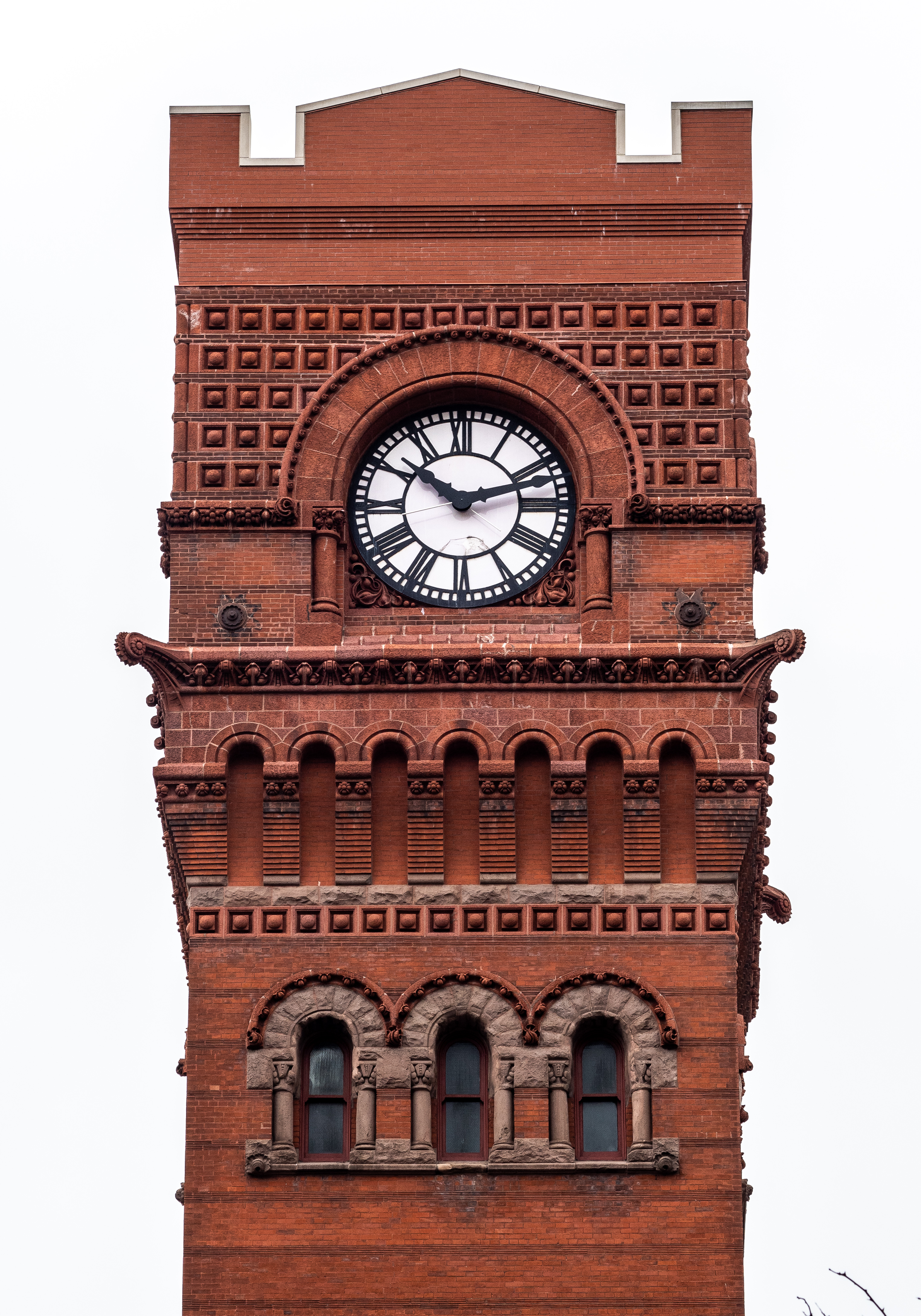
Tower Detail

== Services ==
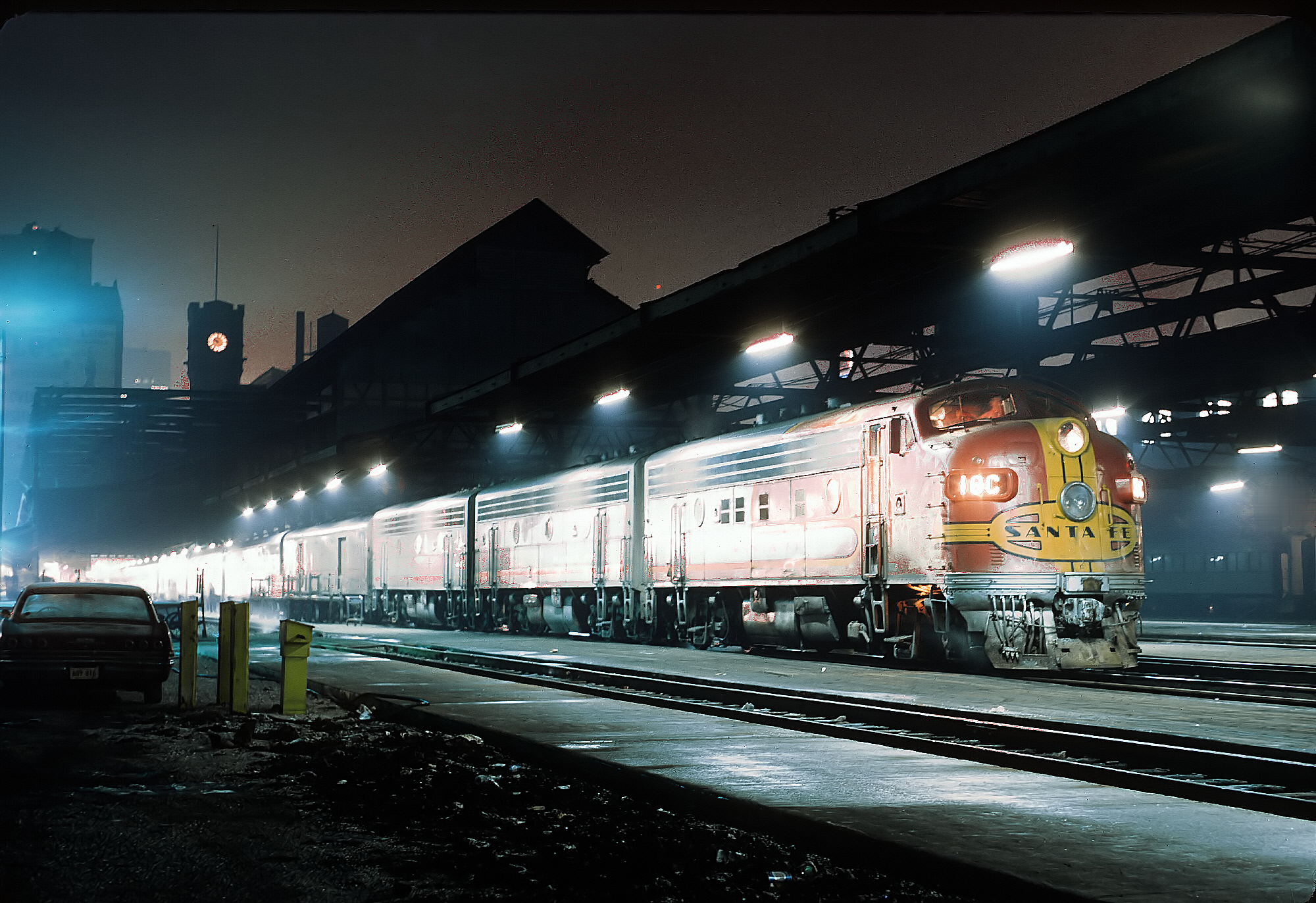
The Kansas City Chief at Dearborn Station on February 5, 1968. The glowing face of the station clock in the clocktower is visible upper-left.

Some of the railroads that served the station include the following, with some of the more well-known name trains listed:

- Atchison, Topeka and Santa Fe Railway (Santa Fe) – the Chief, Super Chief, El Capitan, and Grand Canyon Limited (to name but a few) to Los Angeles, California;

The Texas Chief to Galveston/Houston, Texas;
The Antelope to Oklahoma City, Oklahoma; the Kansas Cityan (and its eastbound counterpart, the Chicagoan) to Kansas City, Missouri; and
The San Francisco Chief to San Francisco, California.
Although the Santa Fe by far operated the greatest number of trains from the station, it was only a tenant.

- Chesapeake and Ohio Railway (moved to the Grand Central Station February 28, 1925).
- Chicago and Eastern Illinois Railroad – Cardinal, Zipper and Silent Knight to St. Louis, Missouri;

The Dixie Flyer, Dixie Flagler, and other Dixie Route trains to Florida; and
The Georgian to Atlanta, Georgia.
From July 31, 1904 to August 1, 1913, Chicago & Eastern Illinois trains used LaSalle Street Station.

- Chicago, Indianapolis and Louisville Railway (Monon) – Hoosier and Tippecanoe to Indianapolis, Indiana, Thoroughbred to Louisville, Kentucky.
- Erie Railroad (Erie Lackawanna Railway from 1960) – Atlantic Express and Pacific Express, Erie Limited, Phoebe Snow and Lake Cities to Hoboken, or Jersey City, New Jersey.
- Grand Trunk Western Railroad – Maple Leaf, Inter-City Limited and International Limited to Toronto, Ontario and Montreal, Quebec. Mohawk to Detroit, Michigan.
- Wabash Railroad (Norfolk and Western Railway from 1964) – Blue Bird and Banner Blue to St. Louis, Missouri.

The following commuter rail services also operated from the station:

- Chicago and Eastern Illinois Railroad (until 1935) – operated from Dearborn Station to Crete, Illinois. Metra has proposed to revive the route as its SouthEast Service.
- Chicago and Western Indiana Railroad (until 1964) – operated between Dearborn Station and Dolton, Illinois serving mostly local stops within Chicago's far south side.
- Chicago and Erie Railroad – operated from Dearborn Station to Rochester, Indiana.
- Grand Trunk Western Railroad (until 1935) – operated from Dearborn Station to Valparaiso, Indiana (later service was cut-back to Harvey, Illinois).
- Wabash Railroad (Norfolk and Western Railway from 1964) – used a track west of the station until 1976, when moved to the Union Station); now Metra's SouthWest Service.
- Santa Fe Railway (until 1903) – operated from Dearborn Station to Joliet, Illinois.

== In popular culture ==
In blues musician Henry Thomas' 1927 song "Railroadin' Some", the "Polk Street Depot" is the next to last stop on a journey that begins in Fort Worth, Texas, and ends in Chicago.

Dearborn Station is mentioned multiple times in the 1974 "Adam's Ribs" episode of M*A*S*H, in which Hawkeye Pierce craves the barbecued ribs from a fictional restaurant adjacent to the station, but can't recall the name. He calls the station master from South Korea to get the restaurant's name and phone number. Hawkeye refers to the terminal as the "Dearborn Street Station".

"Dearborn Station" is a song by the rock band Fortune that was released in 1985.

== Photo Gallery ==
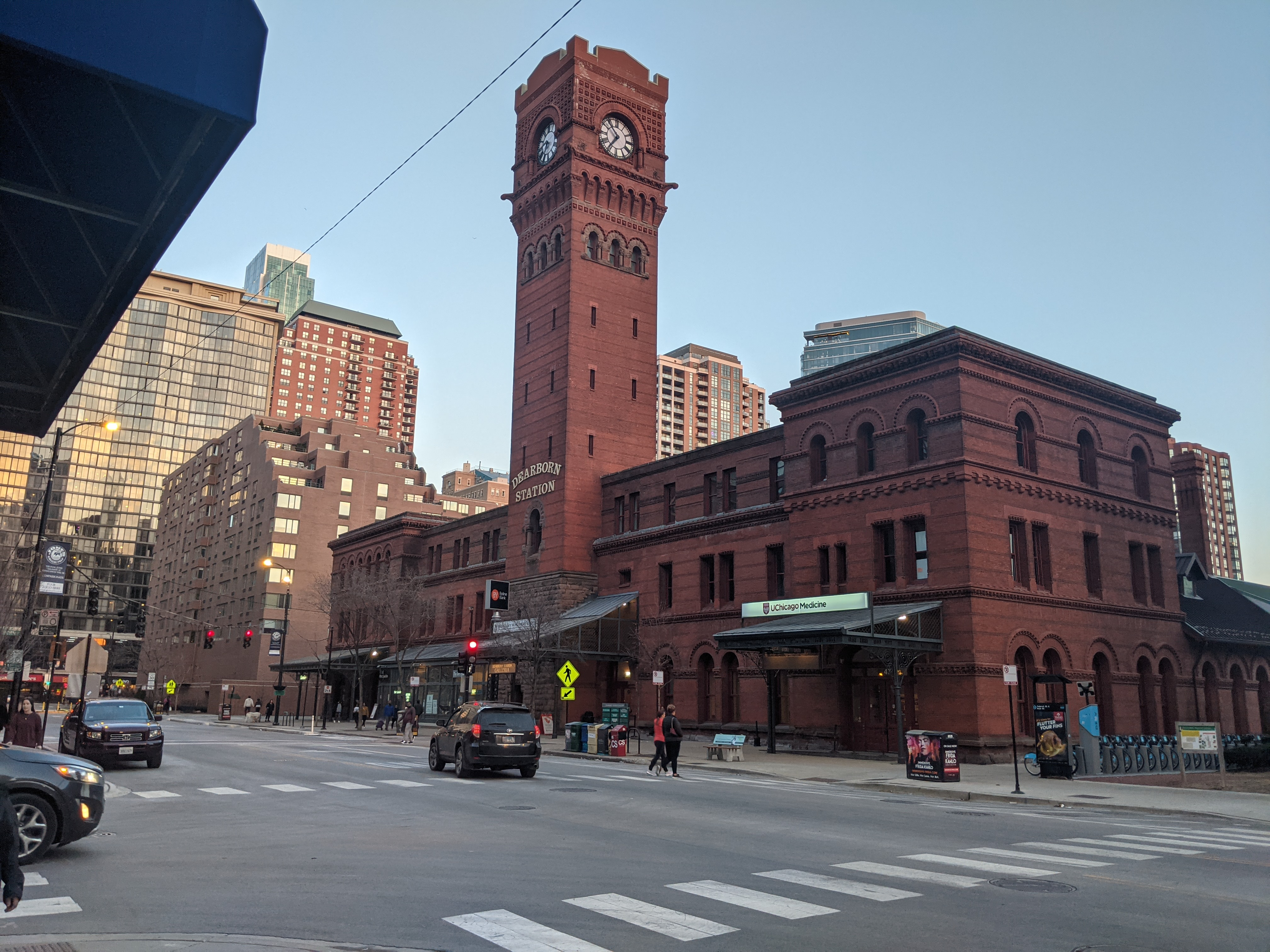
The north (frontal) and west side

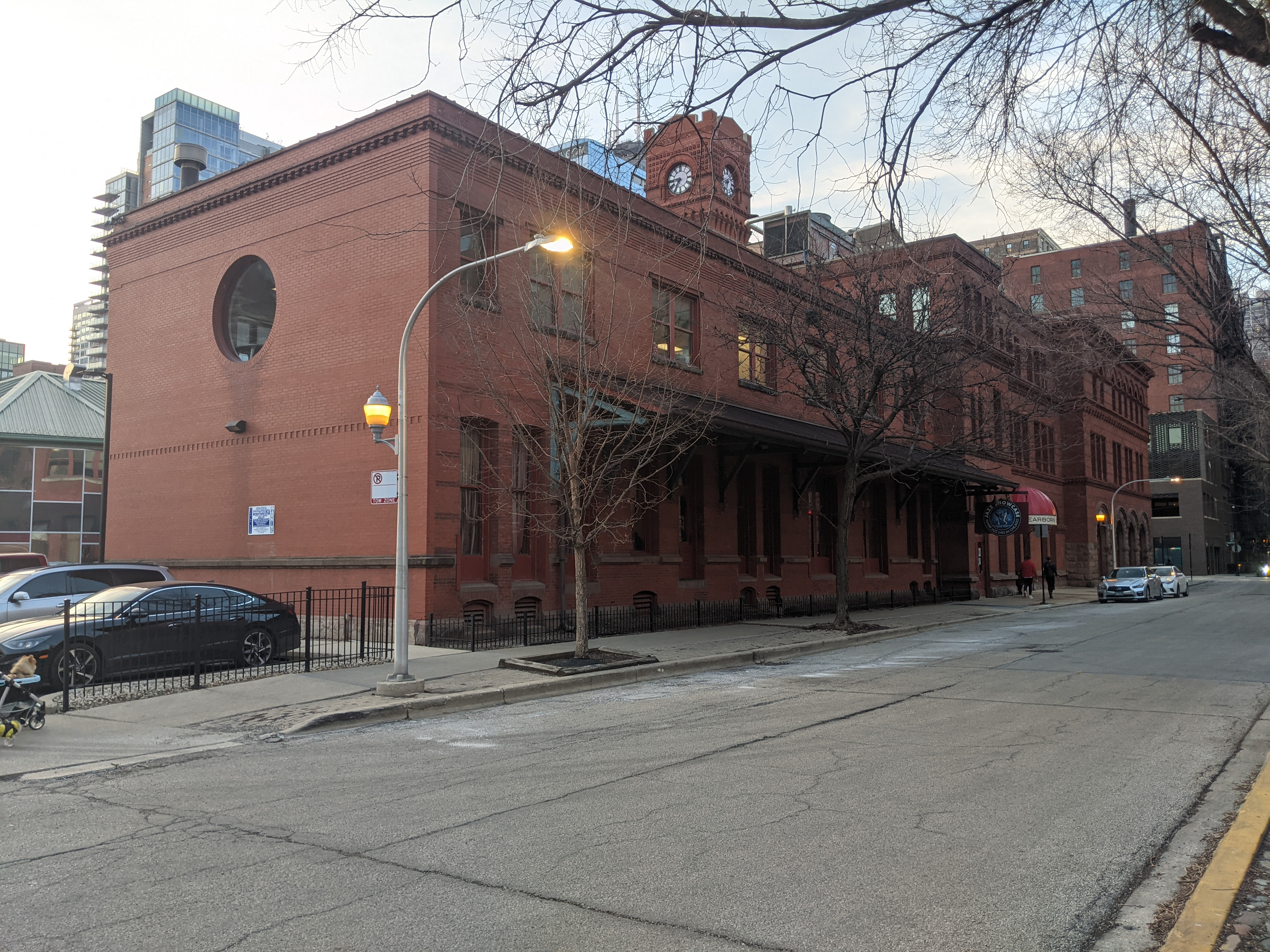
The east side

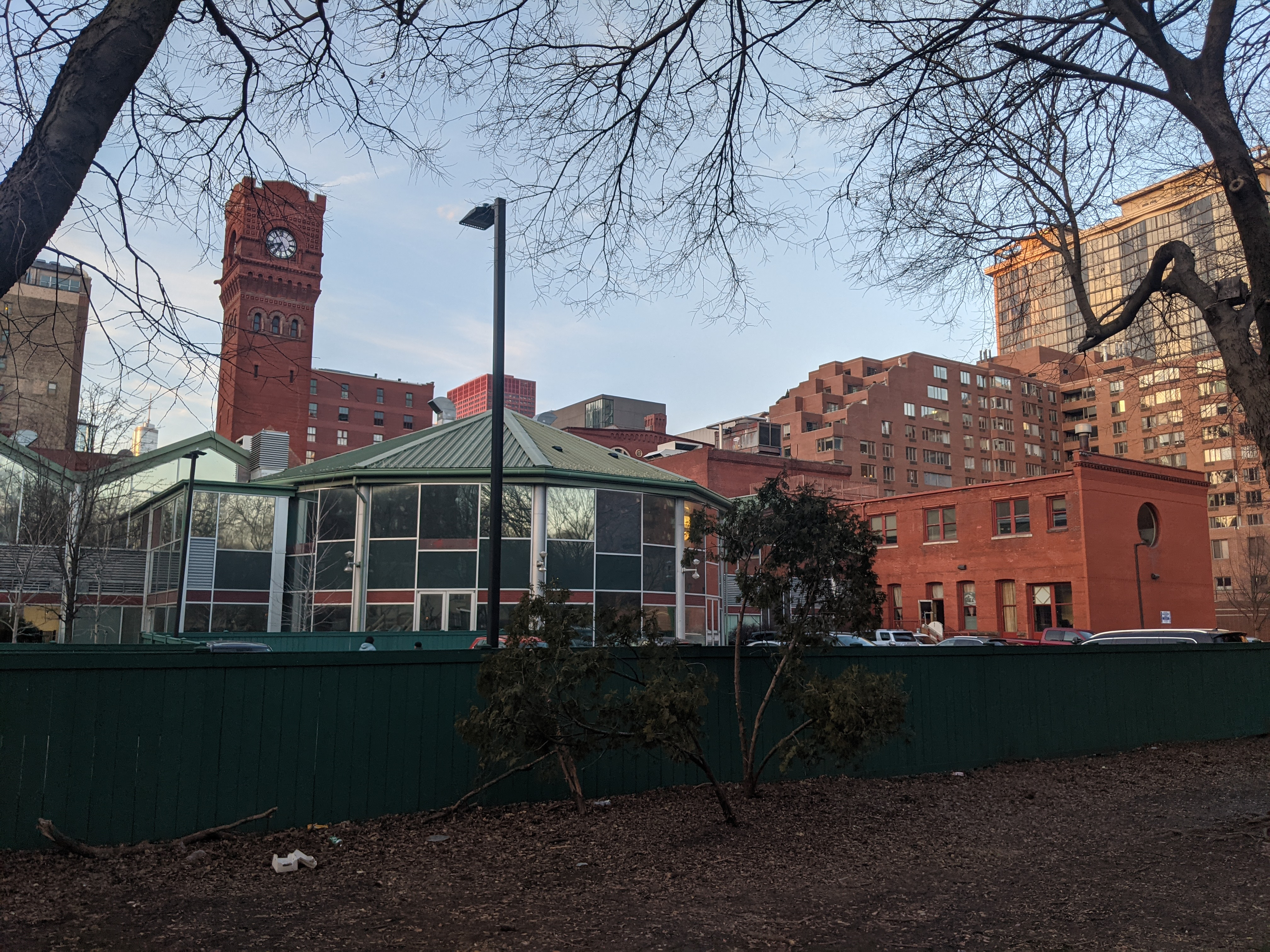
The south (rear) side

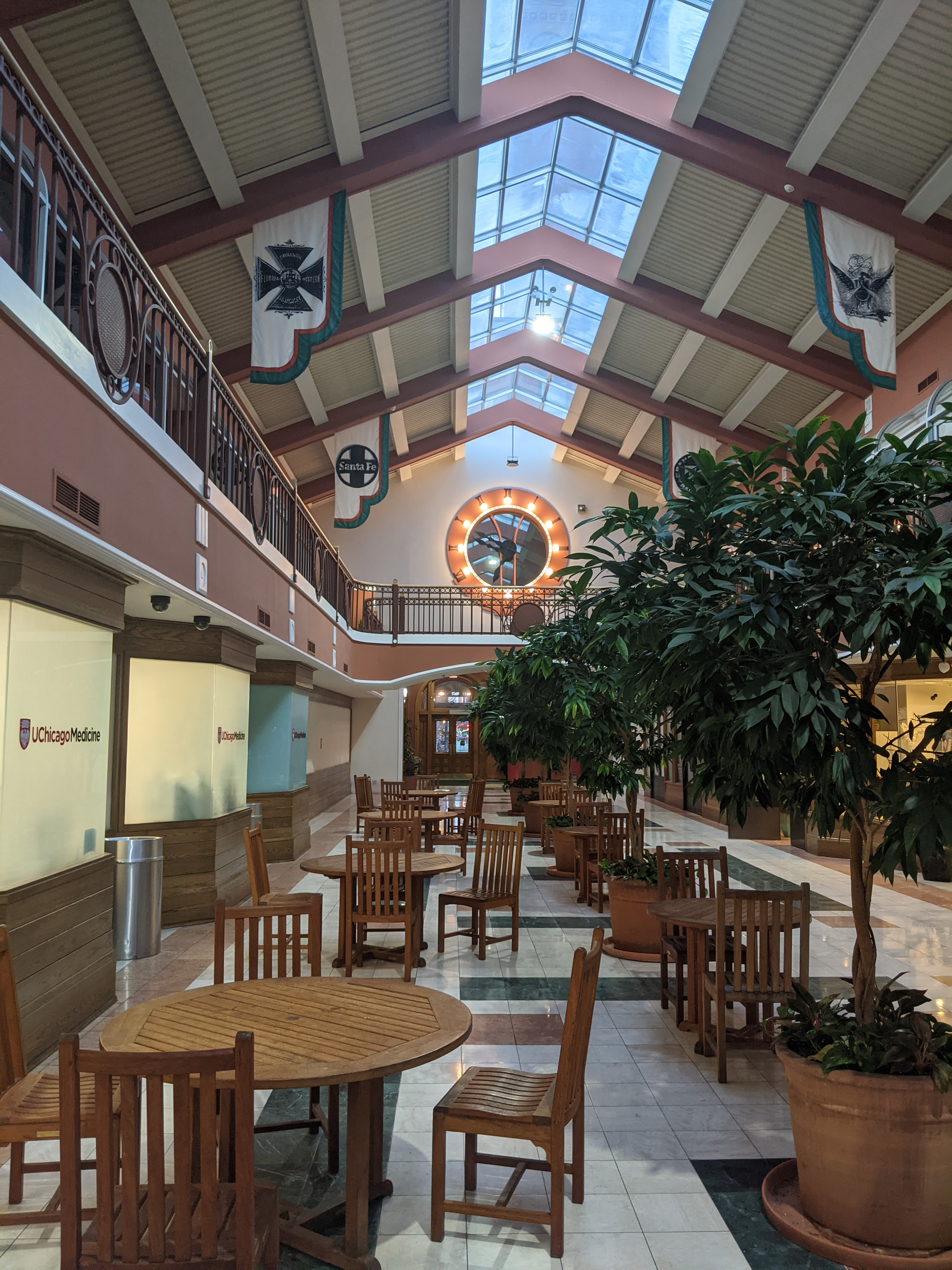
Inside the building

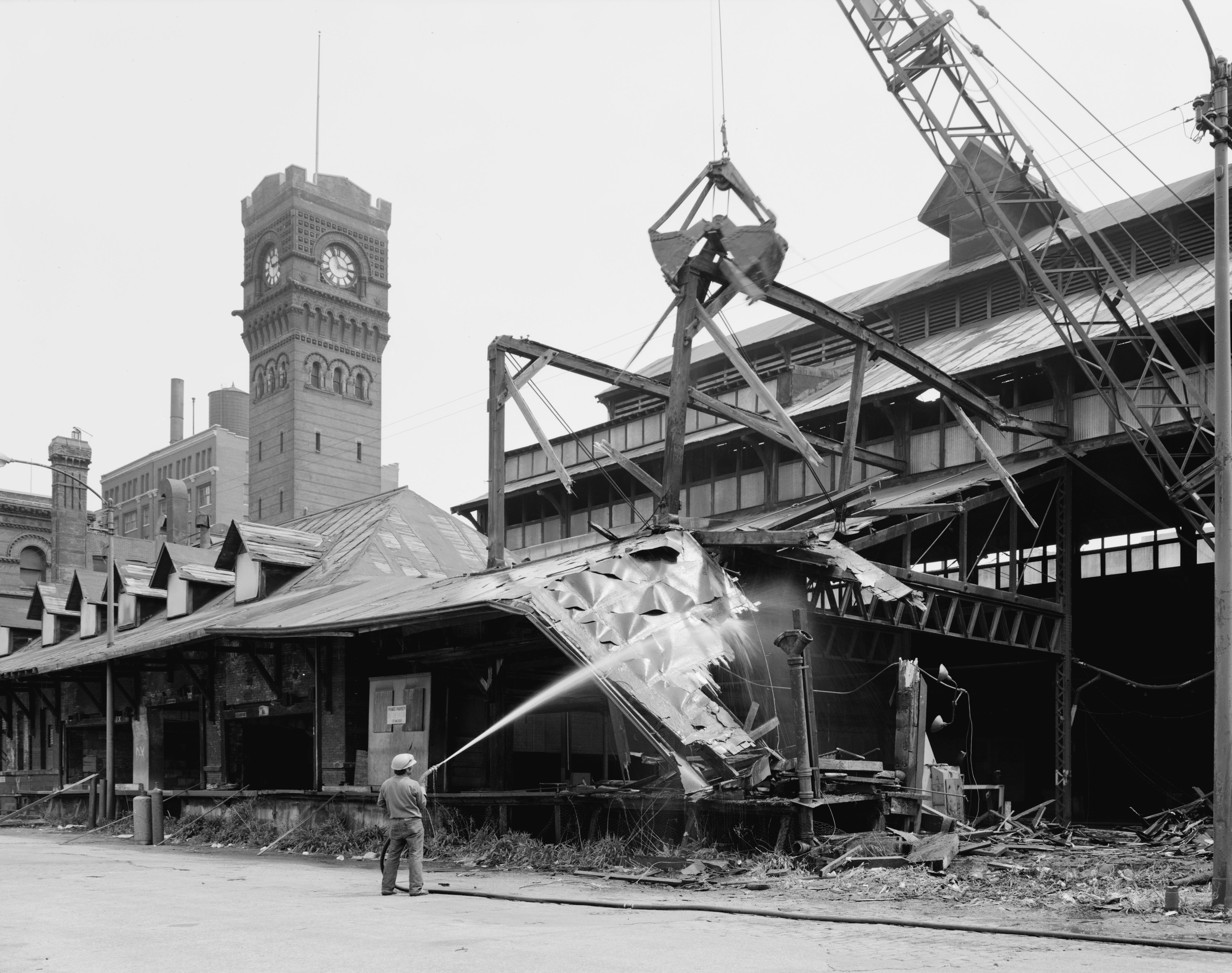
The station's train shed being demolished in May 1976; the "head house" can be seen at the rear

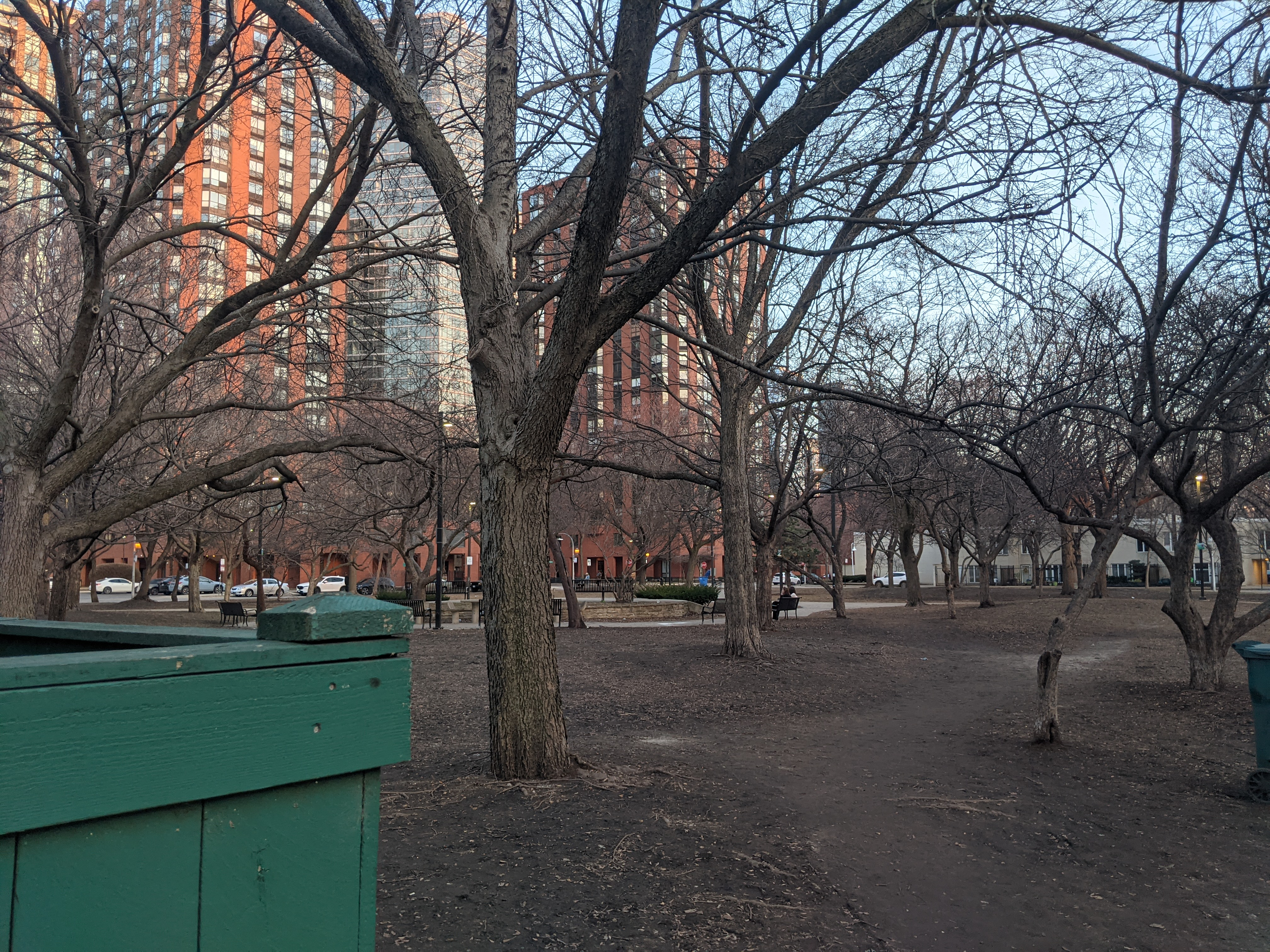
A city park, Dearborn Park, and townhouses now occupy the former platform and trackage area

== See also ==
- Architecture of Chicago
- Printer's Row, Chicago
- South Loop
- Chicago Union Station
- Central Station (Chicago terminal)
- Great Central Station
