= Cincinnati Union Terminal =

Train station in Cincinnati, Ohio

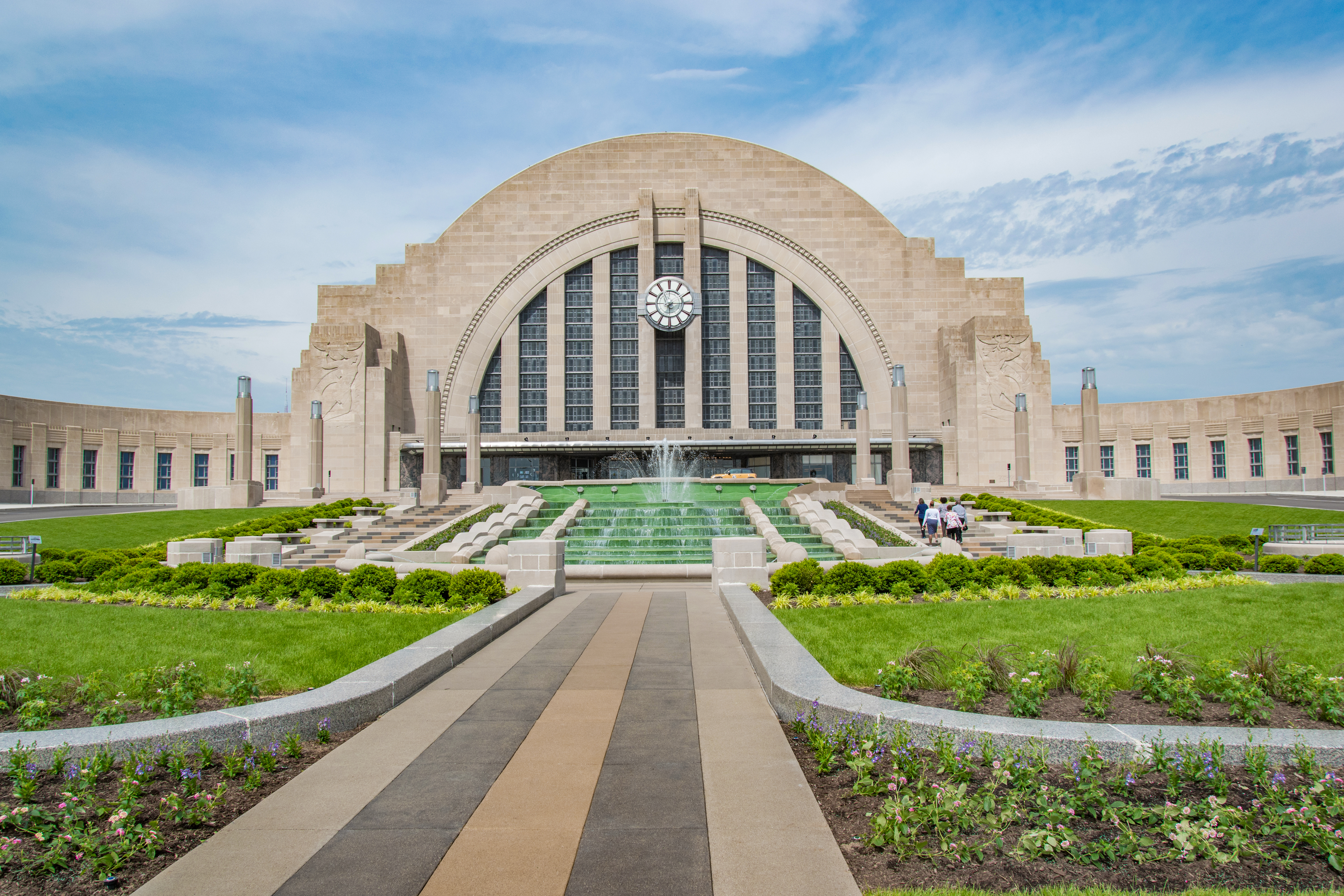
- Main (east) facade

General information
- Location: 1301 Western Avenue; Cincinnati, Ohio; United States
- Owner: City of Cincinnati
- Line: CSX Cincinnati Terminal Subdivision
- Platforms: 1 side platform (originally 8)
- Tracks: 2 (originally 16)
- Connections: SORTA: 49

Construction
- Accessible: Yes (Note: Cincinnati Union Terminal has an accessible platform, parking facility, waiting room, ticket office, and restroom. It offers wheelchairs and wheelchair lifts. It lacks high platforms to enable level boarding.)

Other information
- Station code: Amtrak: CIN

History
- Opened: March 19, 1933
- Closed: October 29, 1972; reopened July 29, 1991

Passengers
- FY 2025: 10,846 (Amtrak)

Services
Preceding station	Amtrak	Following station
Connersville toward Chicago	Cardinal	Maysville toward New York
Former services
Preceding station	Amtrak	Following station
Indianapolis toward Chicago	James Whitcomb Riley and George Washington 1971–1972	Ashland toward Washington, D.C. or Newport News
Preceding station	Baltimore and Ohio Railroad	Following station
Delhi toward St. Louis	St. Louis Line	Winton Place toward Cumberland
Terminus	Toledo Division	Winton Place toward Detroit
Terminus	Cincinnati – Pittsburgh	Winton Place toward Pittsburgh
Preceding station	Chesapeake and Ohio Railway	Following station
Terminus	Main Line	Covington toward Washington, D.C. or Phoebus
Brighton toward Hammond	Chicago, Cincinnati & Louisville Railroad	Terminus
Preceding station	Louisville and Nashville Railroad	Following station
Covington toward New Orleans	Main Line	Terminus
Terminus	Cincinnati – Atlanta	Covington toward Atlanta
Preceding station	New York Central Railroad	Following station
Delhi toward Chicago	Chicago – Cincinnati	Terminus
Terminus	Cincinnati – Cleveland	Dayton toward Cleveland
Terminus	Cincinnati – Cleveland	Winton Place toward Cleveland
Terminus	Cincinnati – Toledo	Winton Place toward Toledo
Preceding station	Norfolk and Western Railway	Following station
Terminus	Main Line	Clare toward Norfolk
Preceding station	Pennsylvania Railroad	Following station
Winton Place toward Chicago	Chicago – Cincinnati	Terminus
Terminus	Cincinnati – Cleveland	Winton Place toward Cleveland
Terminus	Cincinnati, Lebanon and Northern Railway	Oak Street toward Lebanon
Preceding station	Southern Railway	Following station
Cincinnati Junction toward New Orleans	New Orleans – Cincinnati	Terminus
Proposed services
Preceding station	Amtrak	Following station
Oxford toward Chicago	Cardinal	Maysville toward New York
- 39°06′36″N 84°32′16″W

History
- Built: 1928–1933

Site notes
- Area: 287 acres (116 ha)
- Architect: Fellheimer & Wagner
- Architectural style: Art Deco
- Restored: 2016–2018
- Visitors: 1.8 million (in 2019)
- Website: Amtrak station listing

U.S. National Historic Landmark
- Designated: May 5, 1977
- Reference no.: 72001018

U.S. National Register of Historic Places
- Designated: October 31, 1972
- Reference no.: 72001018

Cincinnati Local Historic Landmark
- Designated: March 6, 1974
- Reference no.: 0079-1974
Location

Cincinnati Union Terminal is an intercity train station and museum center in the Queensgate neighborhood of Cincinnati, Ohio. Commonly abbreviated as CUT, or by its Amtrak station code, CIN, the terminal is served by Amtrak's Cardinal line, passing through Cincinnati three times weekly. The building's largest tenant is the Cincinnati Museum Center, comprising the Cincinnati History Museum, the Museum of Natural History & Science, Duke Energy Children's Museum, the Cincinnati History Library and Archives, and an Omnimax theater.

Union Terminal's distinctive architecture, interior design, and history have earned it several landmark designations, including as a National Historic Landmark. Its Art Deco design incorporates several contemporaneous works of art, including two of the Winold Reiss industrial murals, a set of sixteen mosaic murals depicting Cincinnati industry commissioned for the terminal in 1931. The main space in the facility, the Rotunda, has two enormous mosaic murals designed by Reiss. Taxi and bus driveways leading to and from the Rotunda are now used as museum space. The now-demolished train concourse held all 16 of Reiss's industrial murals, along with other art and design features.

The Cincinnati Union Terminal Company was created in 1927, to build a union station to replace five local stations used by seven railroads. Construction, which lasted from 1928 to 1933, included the creation of viaducts, mail and express buildings, and utility structures: a power plant, water treatment facility, and roundhouse. Six of the railroads terminated at the station, which they jointly owned, while the Baltimore and Ohio operated through services.

Initially underused, the terminal saw traffic grow through World War II, then decline over the following four decades. Several attractions were mounted over the years to supplement declining revenues. Train services ended in 1972, and Amtrak moved service to a smaller station nearby. The terminal was largely dormant from 1972 to 1980. During that time, its platforms and train concourse were demolished. In 1980, the Land of Oz shopping mall was constructed inside the station, which operated until 1985. In the late 1980s, two Cincinnati museums merged and renovated the terminal, which reopened in 1990 as the Cincinnati Museum Center. Amtrak returned to the terminal in 1991, and it resumed its role as an intercity train station. A two-year, $228 million renovation was completed in 2018.

== Services ==
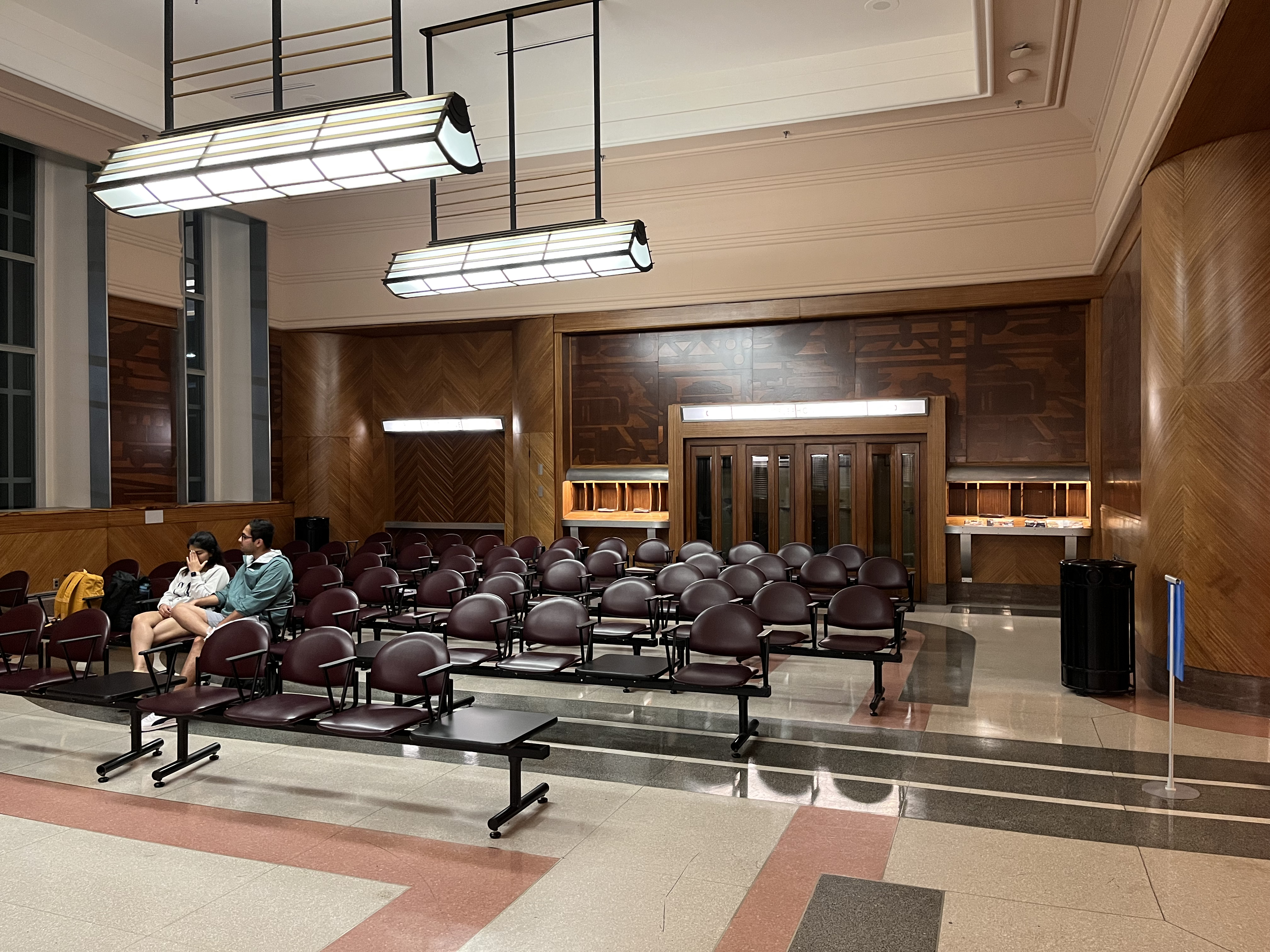
The Amtrak waiting room in 2023

The station is served by Amtrak's Cardinal line, operating every other day, three times per week. The service runs between Chicago and New York City; trains to Chicago arrive at 1:31 a.m. and trains to New York arrive at 3:17 a.m., each departing 10 minutes later.

Likely as a result of the extreme late-night schedule, ridership is among the lowest of Amtrak stations in Ohio and among the lowest for any station serving a metropolitan area of at least two million people. Union Terminal saw 11,862 boardings and alightings in 2016, 11,144 in 2017, 8,315 in 2018, 8,641 in 2019, 5,451 in 2020 and 7,164 in 2021. Ohio's total ridership for 2019 was 132,000 people.

The terminal is connected to Route 49 of Metro, the Southwest Ohio Regional Transit Authority's bus system, which also connects to downtown Cincinnati, North Fairmount, and English Woods. The last bus of the night arrives at the terminal at 12:40 a.m., and the first bus in the morning arrives at 4:55 a.m.

=== Former services ===
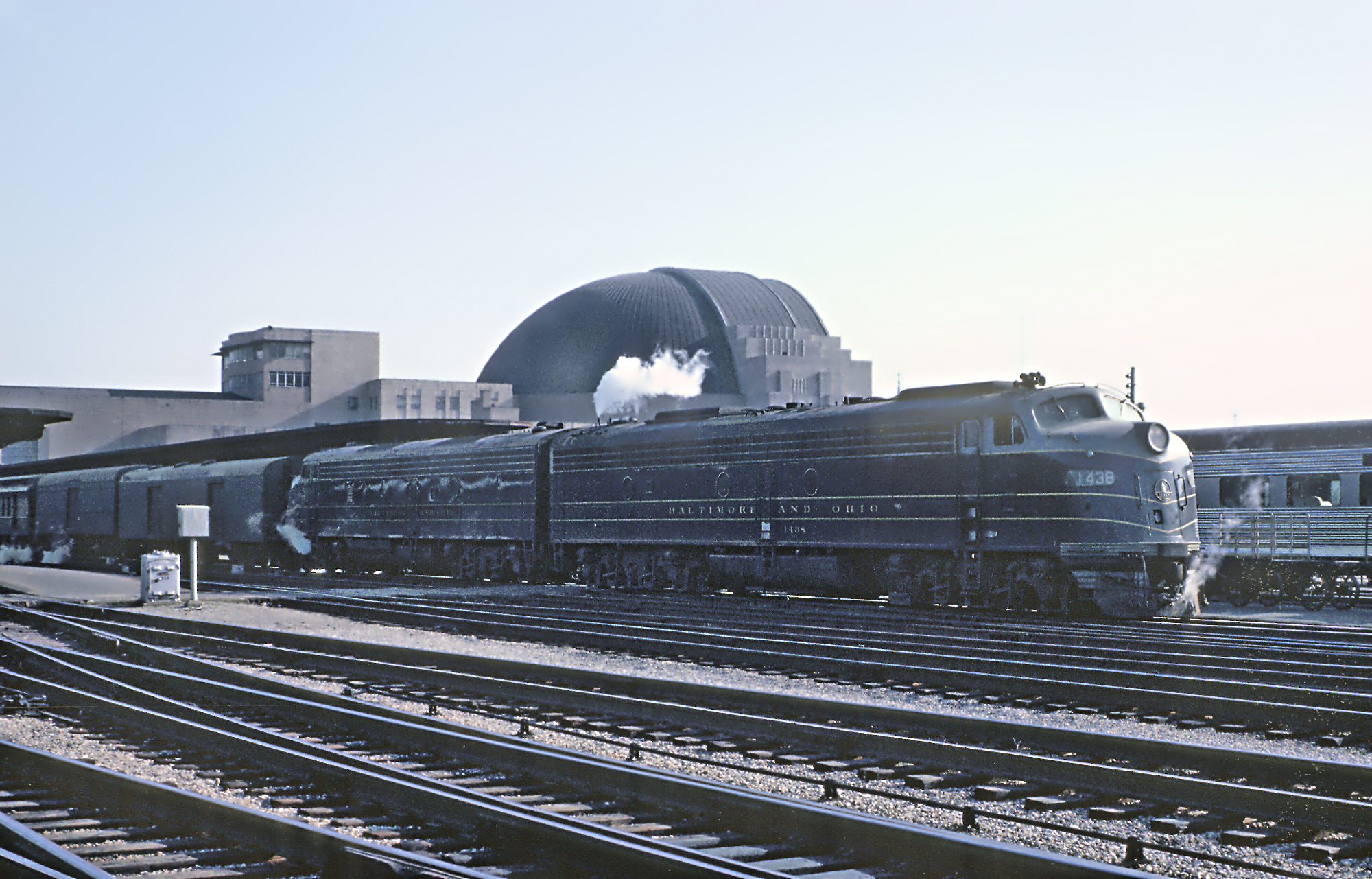
The National Limited began service in 1916, making it one of Union Terminal's inaugural services.

The terminal opened with service from seven railroads: the Baltimore and Ohio Railroad; Chesapeake and Ohio Railway; Cleveland, Cincinnati, Chicago and St. Louis Railway; Louisville and Nashville Railroad; Norfolk and Western Railway; Pennsylvania Railroad; and the Southern Railway.

Amtrak maintained two services there until moving to the Cincinnati River Road station in 1972, where they remained until returning to Union Terminal in 1991.

Named trains that have stopped at Union Terminal
Name	Operators	Year begun	Year discontinued	Notes	References
Azalean	L & N	1937	1953		
Buckeye	PRR	1957	1969		
Cardinal	Amtrak	1991	Active service		
Carolina Special	SOU	1911	1968	Inaugural service to CUT	
Cavalier	N & W	1928	1966	Inaugural service to CUT	
Cincinnati Limited	PRR, PC	1920	1971	Inaugural service to CUT	
Cincinnati Mercury	NYC	1951	1957		
Cincinnatian	B & O	1947	1971		
Fast Flying Virginian	C & O	1889	1968	Inaugural service to CUT	
Flamingo	L & N	1925	1968	Inaugural service to CUT	
Florida Sunbeam	SOU	1936	1949		
George Washington	C & O, Amtrak	1932	1972	Inaugural service to CUT	
Great Lakes Limited	B & O	1929	1950	Inaugural service to CUT	
Humming Bird	L & N	1947	1968		
James Whitcomb Riley	NYC, PC, Amtrak	1941	1972		
Metropolitan Special	B & O	1919	1971	Inaugural service to CUT	
Michigan Special	NYC	1930	1958	Inaugural service to CUT	
National Limited	B & O	1916	1971	Inaugural service to CUT	
Night Express	B & O	1960	1967		
Northern Arrow	PRR	1935	1961		
Ohio State Limited	NYC, PC	1924	1967	Inaugural service to CUT	
Pan-American	L & N	1921	1971	Inaugural service to CUT	
Pocahontas	N & W	1926	1971	Inaugural service to CUT	
Ponce de Leon	SOU	1924	1968	Inaugural service to CUT	
Powhatan Arrow	N & W	1946	1969		
Royal Palm	SOU		1970	Inaugural service to CUT	
South Wind	L & N	1940	1971		
Southland	L & N, PRR	1915	1957	Inaugural service to CUT	
Sportsman	C & O	1930	1968	Inaugural service to CUT	
Union	PRR	1933	1971		
White City Special	CCC&StL			Inaugural service to CUT	
Xplorer	NYC	1956	1957		

== Operations ==
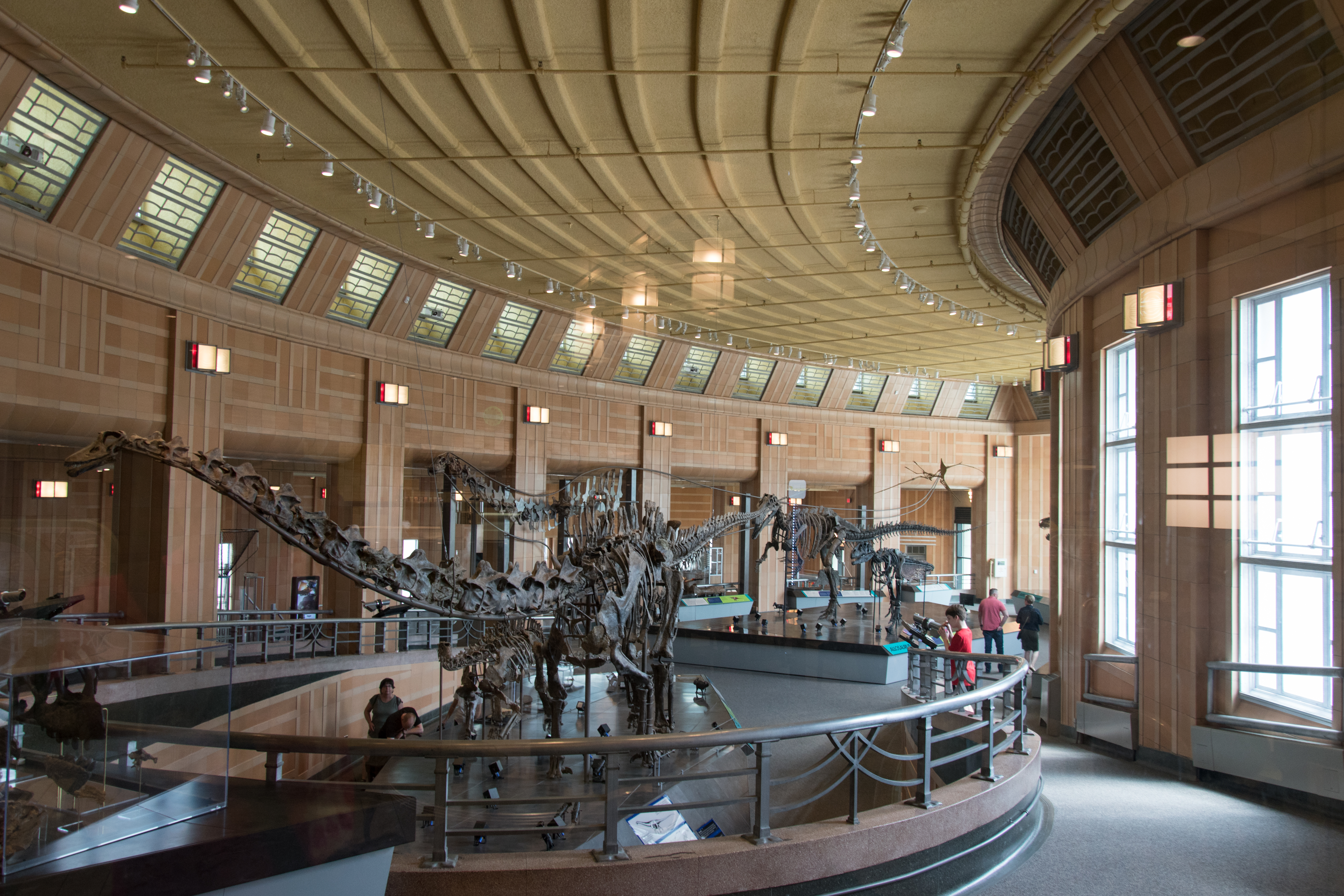
Dinosaur skeleton displays at the Museum of Natural History

The facility, grounds, and parking lot are owned by the City of Cincinnati, while the tracks and platforms are owned by the freight railroad company CSX Transportation. The city leases the building primarily for use by Amtrak and the Cincinnati Museum Center, a collection of five entities:

- Cincinnati History Museum
- Museum of Natural History & Science
- Robert D. Lindner Family Omnimax Theater
- Cincinnati History Library and Archives
- Duke Energy Children's Museum

The terminal also houses the Nancy & David Wolf Holocaust & Humanity Center, several foodservice operations, and event space.

=== Visitor services ===
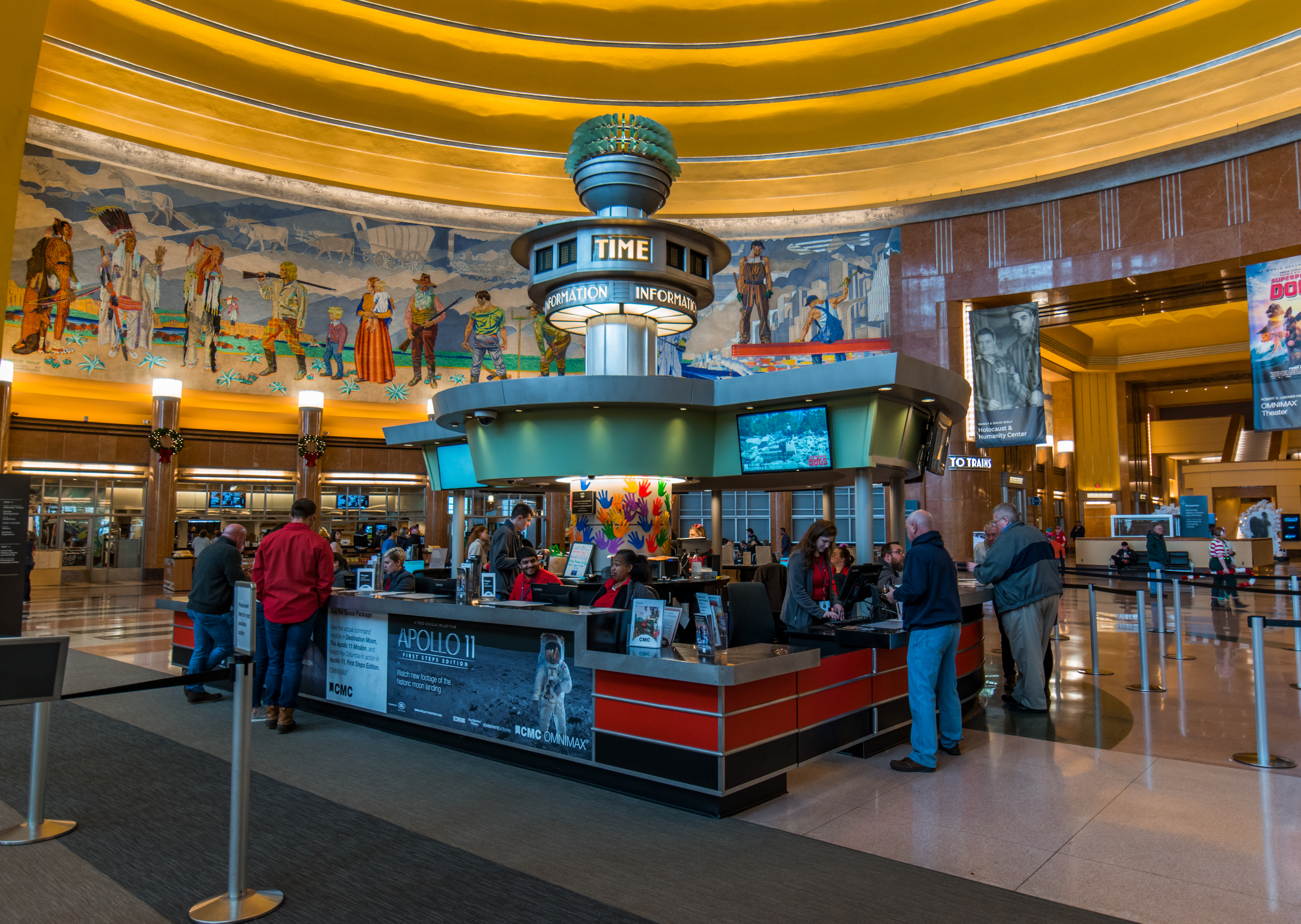
Information desk and ticket office

All areas of the museum center are wheelchair-accessible. The Amtrak station is also accessible and ADA compliant. The main information desk is used for ticketing, and has daily schedules, museum maps, and coat checking, and has information on special events and the building's lost and found items. The Museum of Natural History operates two gift shops: one adjacent to the rotunda and a children's gift shop in the museum wing. The History Library operates a separate shop adjacent to the rotunda.

There are three dining rooms on the main concourse, two on the lower level, a retail shop, and other rotating operations. The main level operation Cup and Pint serves pizzas, coffee, and draft beer, while Nourish 513 serves sandwiches, salads, and fast food. The Rookwood tea room is operating as a Graeter's ice cream location.

In 2014, the museum center and the Google Cultural Institute created a virtual tour of the museum using Google Street View, with about 65 works of art and their descriptive labels viewable.

== Terminal complex attributes ==
=== Architects and Art Deco design ===
The station building was designed by the firm Fellheimer & Wagner, and is considered to be the magnum opus of the firm. Fellheimer was known for designing train stations, and he was lead architect for Grand Central Terminal (1903–1913). The large and busy firm gave the project design to Roland A. Wank, a younger employee.

Wank's original plan was traditional and featured Gothic architecture: large arches, vaulted ceilings, and conventional benches in long rows. In 1930, during initial construction, the terminal company persuaded the architects to hire Paul Philippe Cret as a design consultant. In 1931–32, Cret altered the design aesthetic: thereafter, the terminal and its supporting buildings used modern architecture (later known as Art Deco), even in places not visible or open to the public. The revised designs were approved as cheaper than the intricate Gothic designs, and with more cheerful, stimulating, and colorful interiors than previous designs.

=== Location, layout, and exterior ===
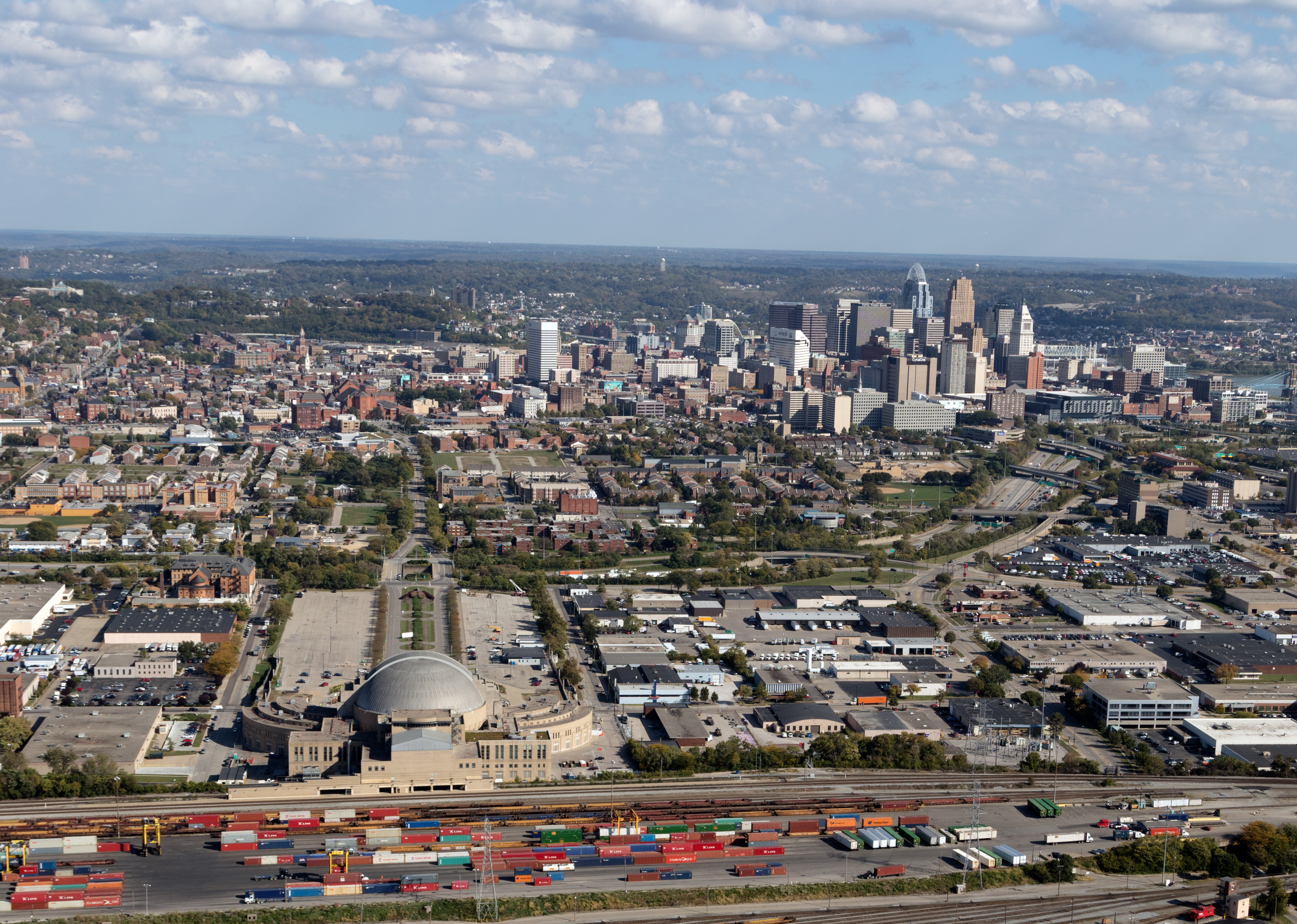
Location facing the Music Hall and downtown

Cincinnati Union Terminal is located in the Queensgate neighborhood, created in the mid-20th century; originally it was part of the West End. The location is north of the Ohio River and west of downtown Cincinnati. The terminal lies directly east of the Gest Street rail yard, and directly west of an expansive lawn and parking lot, formerly Lincoln Park. The terminal lies at the western end of Ezzard Park Drive (named Lincoln Park Drive from 1935 to 1976, after the park, and subsequently named for Cincinnati resident Ezzard Charles). The eastern end of Ezzard Park Drive abuts Cincinnati Music Hall, another icon of Cincinnati, visible from the terminal's front terrace. The complex's northern boundary is Kenner Street, its southern is Hopkins Street, its western is the Gest Street rail yard, and its eastern boundary is Western Avenue (formerly Freeman Avenue).

The terminal complex opened in 1933 with 22 buildings, 287 total acres (116 ha), and 94 miles (151 km) of track. 130 acres were occupied by the terminal and its surrounding grounds, while 157 acres were occupied by supporting railroad facilities. The station building in total has 504,000 square feet (46,800 m^{2}).

The building has a roughly T-shaped structure surmounted by its half-dome. It was built with five floors, but only two primary levels: the track level, and the station floor, placed above the tracks for simplicity of arrangement and for more architectural opportunities. The building lies east of the tracks, facing Downtown Cincinnati. The building is aligned on a central axis: the east lawn, the terrace, the main concourse, the checking lobby, and finally the train concourse built over the tracks, leading to the station's platforms. The station was considered to have a "pull-through" design, less common though more efficient than the "head-house" style. Another example of a pull-through station is Kansas City Union Station, while Grand Central Terminal is a head-house-style terminal. Carroll Meeks, a professor of architecture and art history at Yale University, compared its layout to a half funnel laid out on the ground, with the wide end collecting passengers and the narrow end ejecting them out onto the platforms.

Cincinnati Union Terminal had a capacity of 216 trains per day, 108 in and 108 out, carrying 17,000 passengers. Three concentric lanes of traffic were included in the design of the building, carrying traffic through enclosed ramps to a space beneath the main rotunda of the building, with ramps again for departure. One lane was for cars and taxis, one for buses, and one (never used) for streetcars. Similar to Buffalo Central Terminal, Union Terminal used a system of ramps for passengers to access the 1,600-foot-long (490 m) platforms below the concourse.

The building's architecture and design received general acclaim though, even in 1933, it was seen as being possibly the last grand intercity train station to be built. Carroll Meeks described the passenger's route from the tracks to the concourse and back down again to vehicle ramps as relatively complicated and arduous.

==== Grounds east of the terminal ====
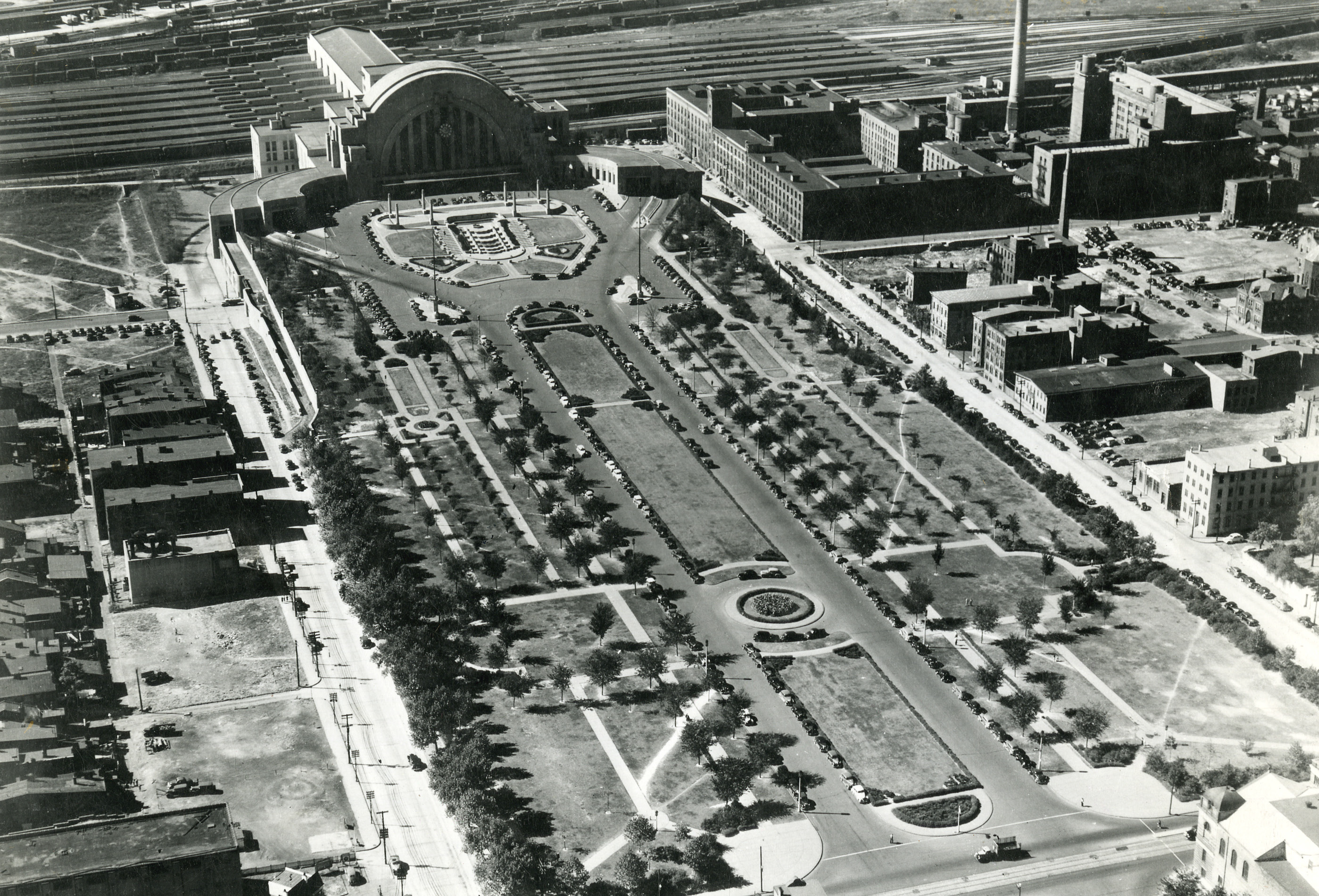
Terminal and grounds, c. 1947

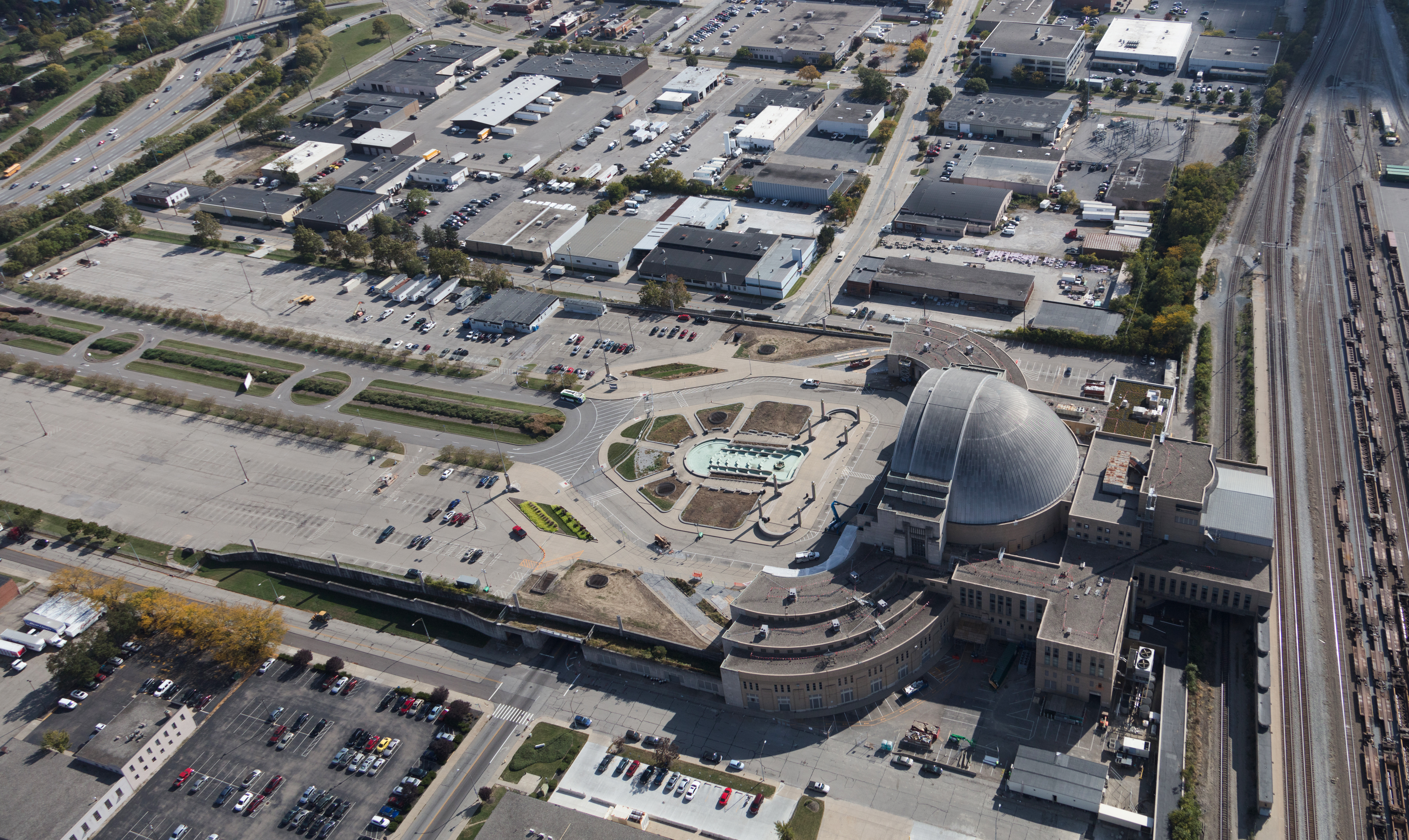
Grounds in 2016

The space to the east of the station consists of a terrace and fountain to the west and parking lots around a narrow lawn to the east.

The terminal lawn originally measured 1,400 by 500 feet (430 m × 150 m), and gently carries broad driveways upward to the terminal. The lawn was originally Lincoln Park, a lush city park. It was remodeled during the terminal's construction to have simpler decorative landscaping, though it retained the name of Lincoln Park. The revised landscaping included elm and sycamore tree borders, with flower beds in the central strip. The central strip is still intact, but the portions to its north and south became parking lots in 1980.

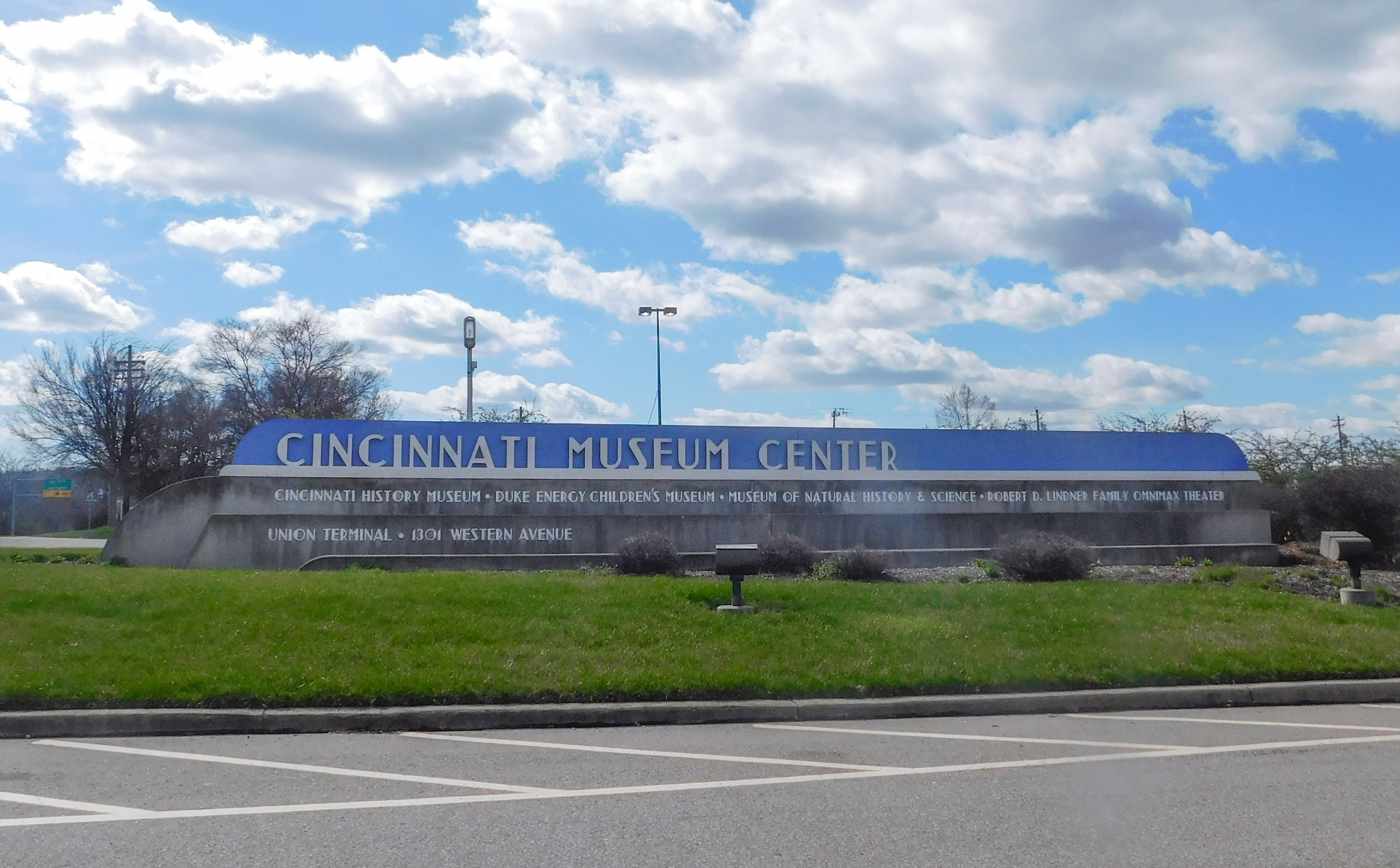
Former entrance sign

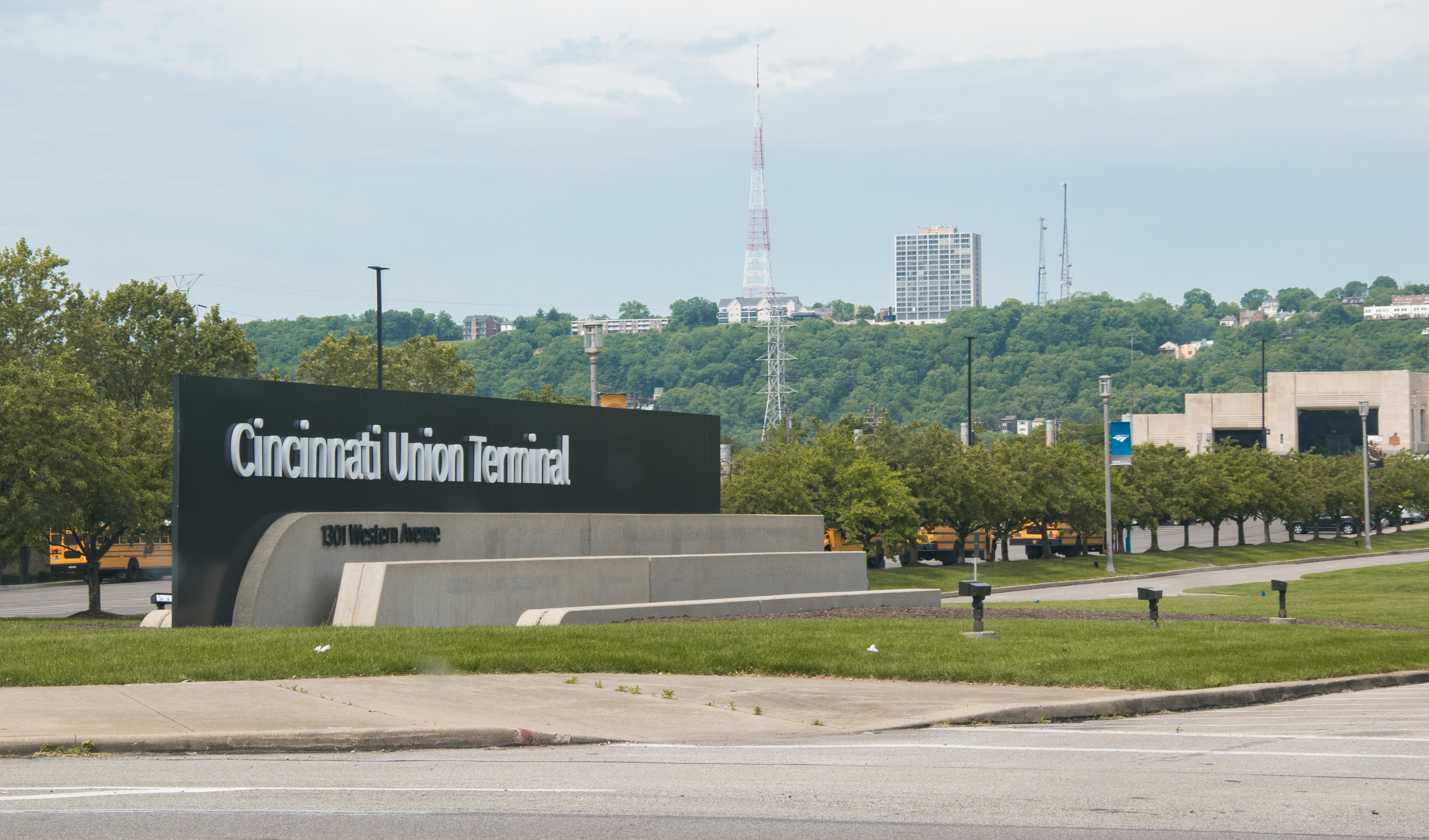
Current sign

The west end of the lawn has an ornamental terrace with steps, hedges, and a central fountain. The terrace also features two groups of four pylons, supporting concealed flood lights. Behind the terrace, a driveway curves around the half oval to the building's entranceway. Dalton Avenue runs through a tunnel beneath the plaza. The fountain cascades water down a set of scalloped tiers into a pool below. It was constructed of concrete and green terrazzo, and was designed by Fellheimer & Wagner.

The grounds also feature a large Art Deco sign, not original to the building. For a time, the sign read "Cincinnati Museum Center" although, during the extensive renovation in 2018, it was replaced with the current sign, reading "Cincinnati Union Terminal".

==== Main facade ====
Inspiration for the main facade

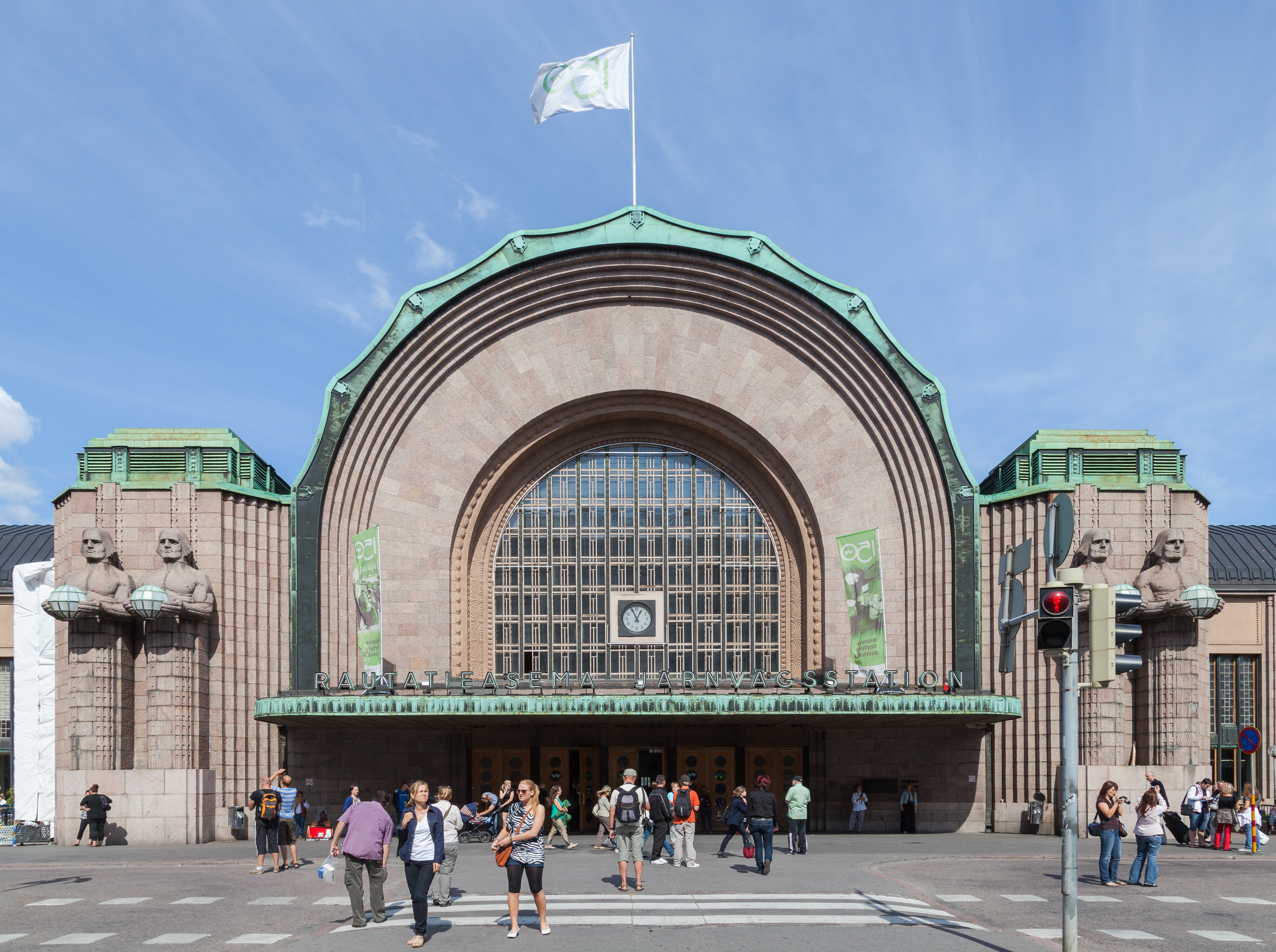
Helsinki Central Station

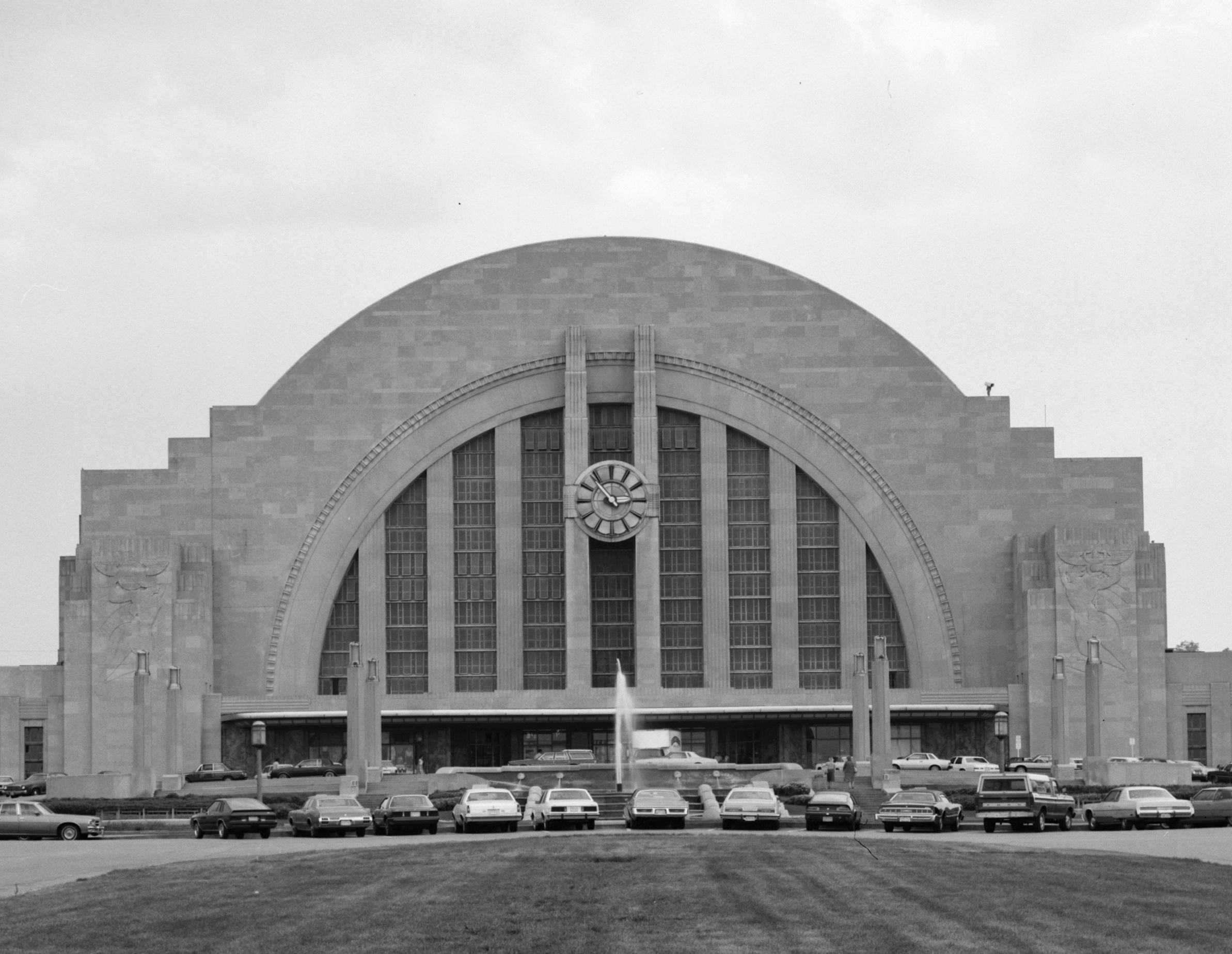
The terminal in 1981

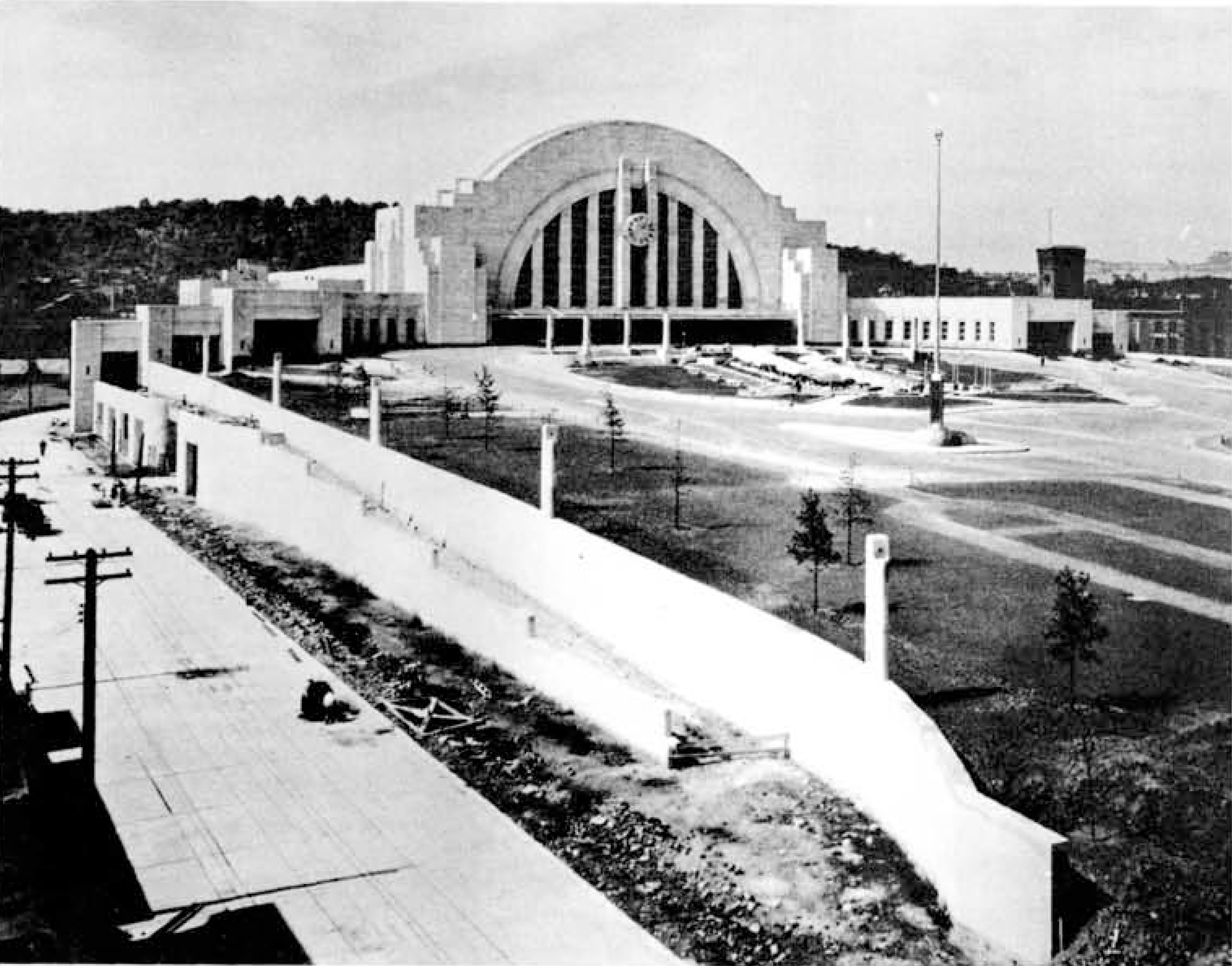
Right to left: incoming traffic wing, rotunda, and outgoing traffic wing and ramp

The main facade, 550 feet (170 m) wide in total, is the only portion visible from the plaza approach, and it is the building's most striking exterior feature. The only arriving passenger entry is from the east side of the terminal, due to rail lines to its north, south, and west. The central portion is semicircular, with a half-circle of frosted windows divided vertically by flat limestone mullions, and a long polished aluminum and glass marquee lies directly beneath the windows. Beneath this are nine aluminum-faced doors leading to a marble vestibule and the rotunda. The arch ends with a series of stepped gables. The domed section is flanked by two symmetrical wings, lower in profile, each of which curves 90 degrees to the east. These curve around the driveway, which was only used for private cars. The north wing carried three lanes of traffic beneath the rotunda and out the south wing; the inner for taxicabs, the middle for buses, and the outer lane was intended for Cincinnati's streetcar system, though it was never used. The taxi and bus drives connected to the main driveway; the streetcar drive utilized separate ramps beginning at Kenner Street and ending at Hopkins Street. In 1956, architectural historian Caroll Meeks referred to the terminal's vehicular traffic system as the most elaborate in any modern station.

The main facade's central arch was inspired by Helsinki Central Station in Helsinki, Finland, which Fellheimer visited in 1927. The terminal was also reported as resembling Kyiv-Pasazhyrskyi railway station in Kyiv, Ukraine.

Two of the mullions of the facade support a large central clock. It measures 18 feet (5.5 m) in diameter and weighs 5 tons. The hour and minute hands measure 6 ft 4 in (1.93 m) and 7 ft 4 in (2.24 m) respectively. There are 52 panes of glass: 24 are red-tinted, while 28 are amber. It is unknown who designed it, though the Cincinnati Watch Company believes it was most likely Paul Cret. It was constructed by the Seth Thomas Clock Company. The clock is original to the terminal, and was synchronized with all others in the terminal with a system created by IBM. Neon tubing on the aluminum hour and minute hands is also original, lighting them in an orange-red hue. The hands were originally skeleton hands, with a hollow center. Later on, they were modified and filled in. The 2016-2018 renovation restored the clock, and returned the hands to their original appearance.

The relatively unornamented facade has two bas-relief carvings by Maxfield Keck on buttresses at the north and south ends of the arch. The north carving represents transportation, while the south represents commerce.

Gallery

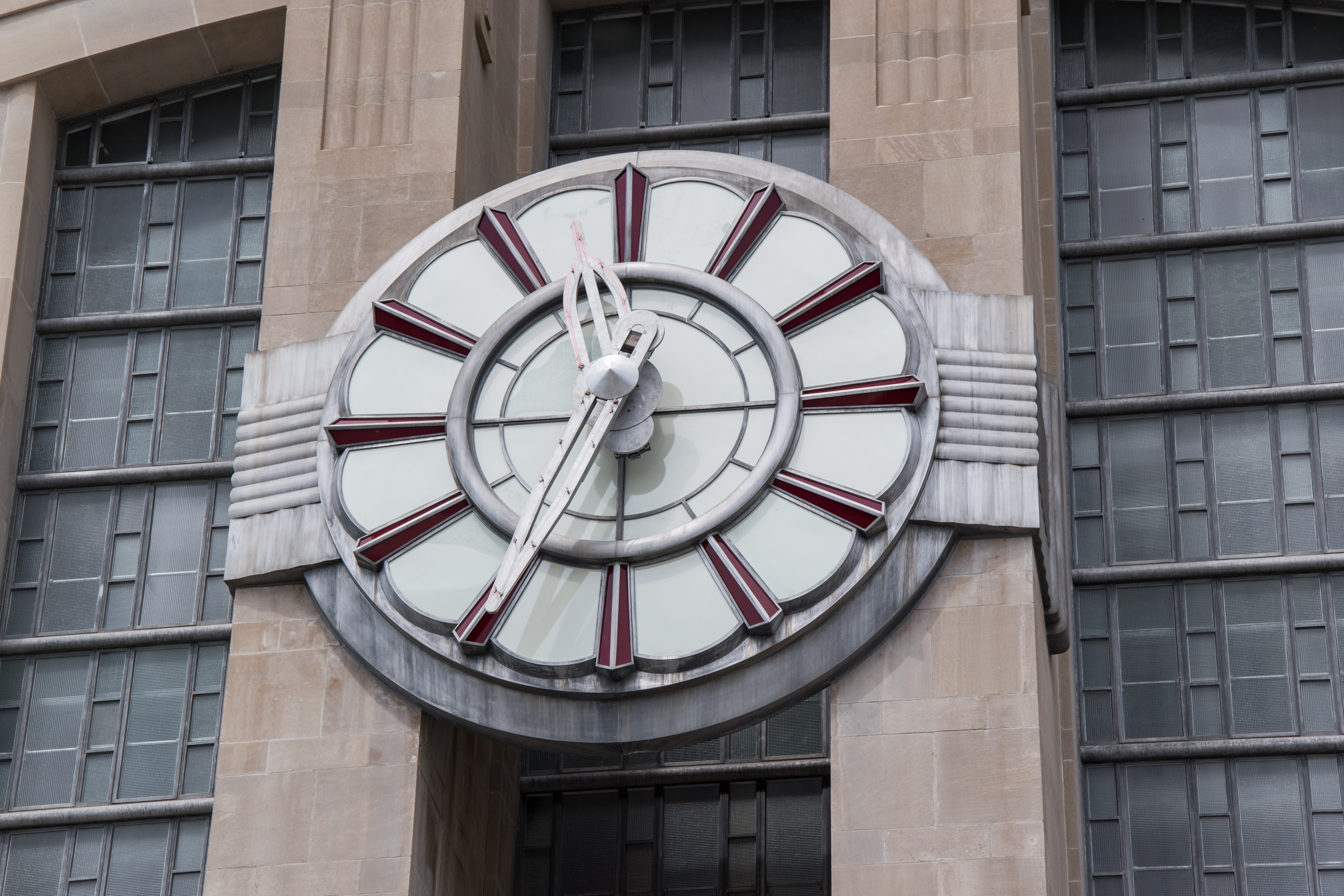
Exterior clock

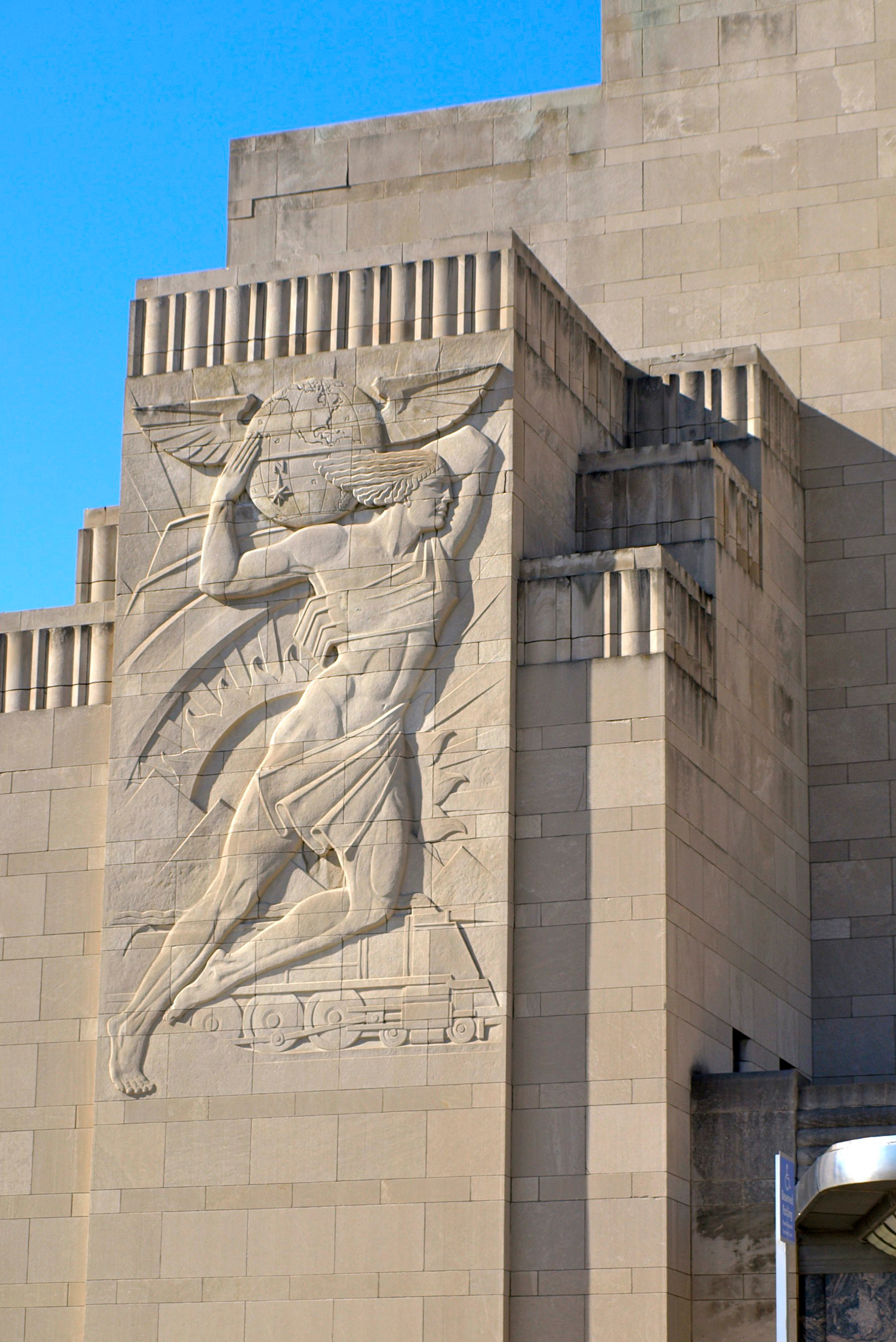
South buttress carving

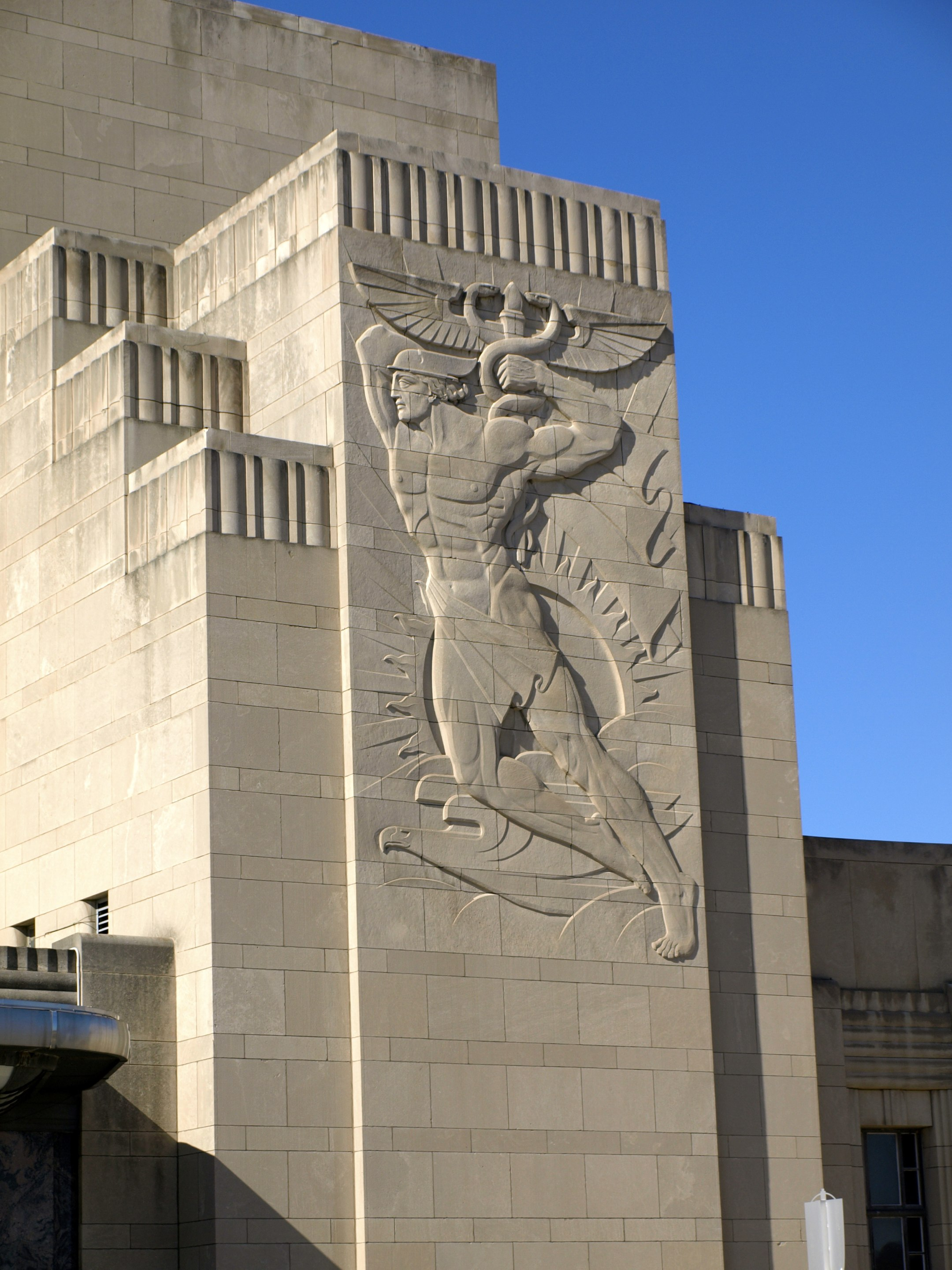
North buttress carving

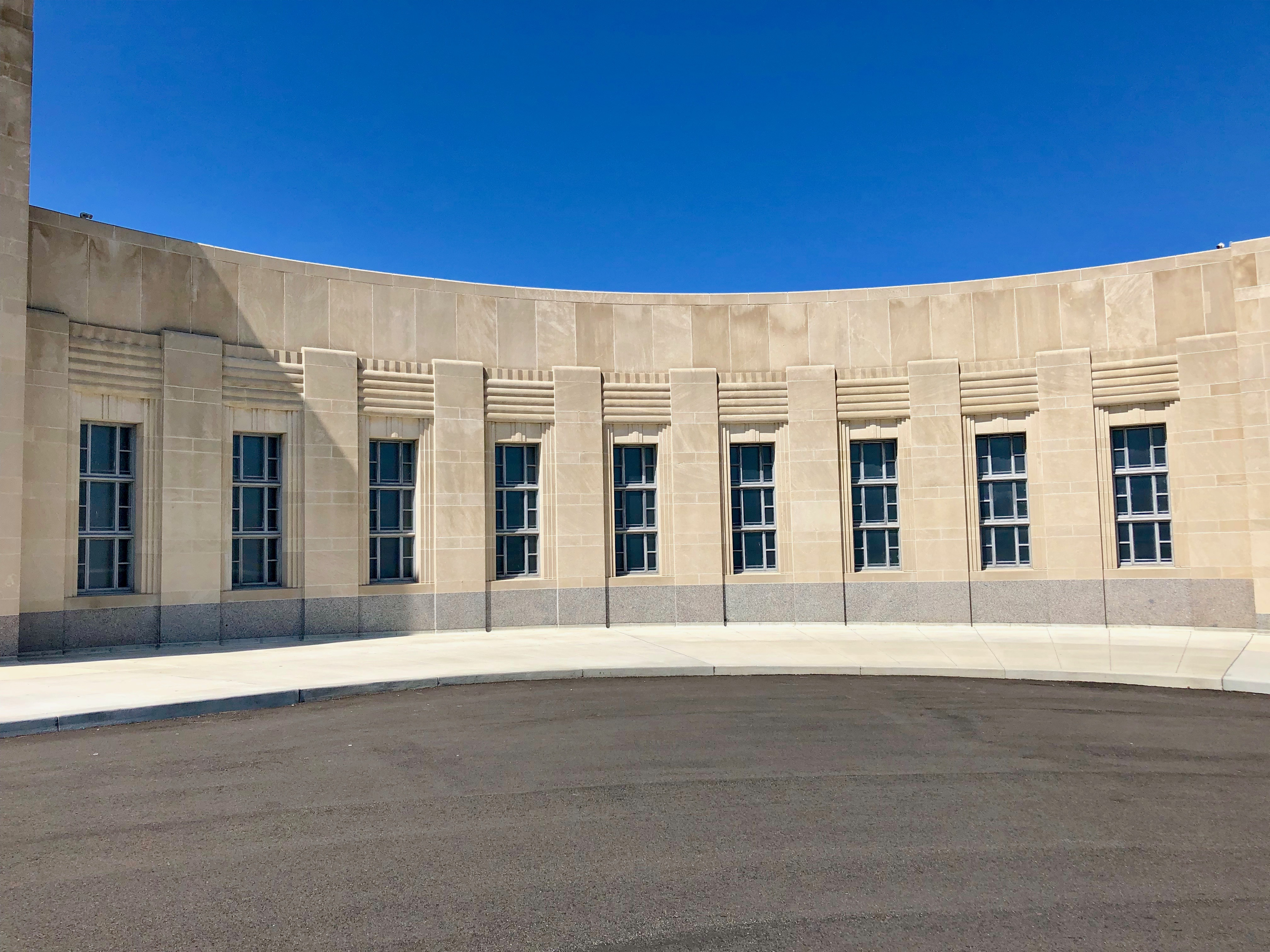
Detail of the north wing

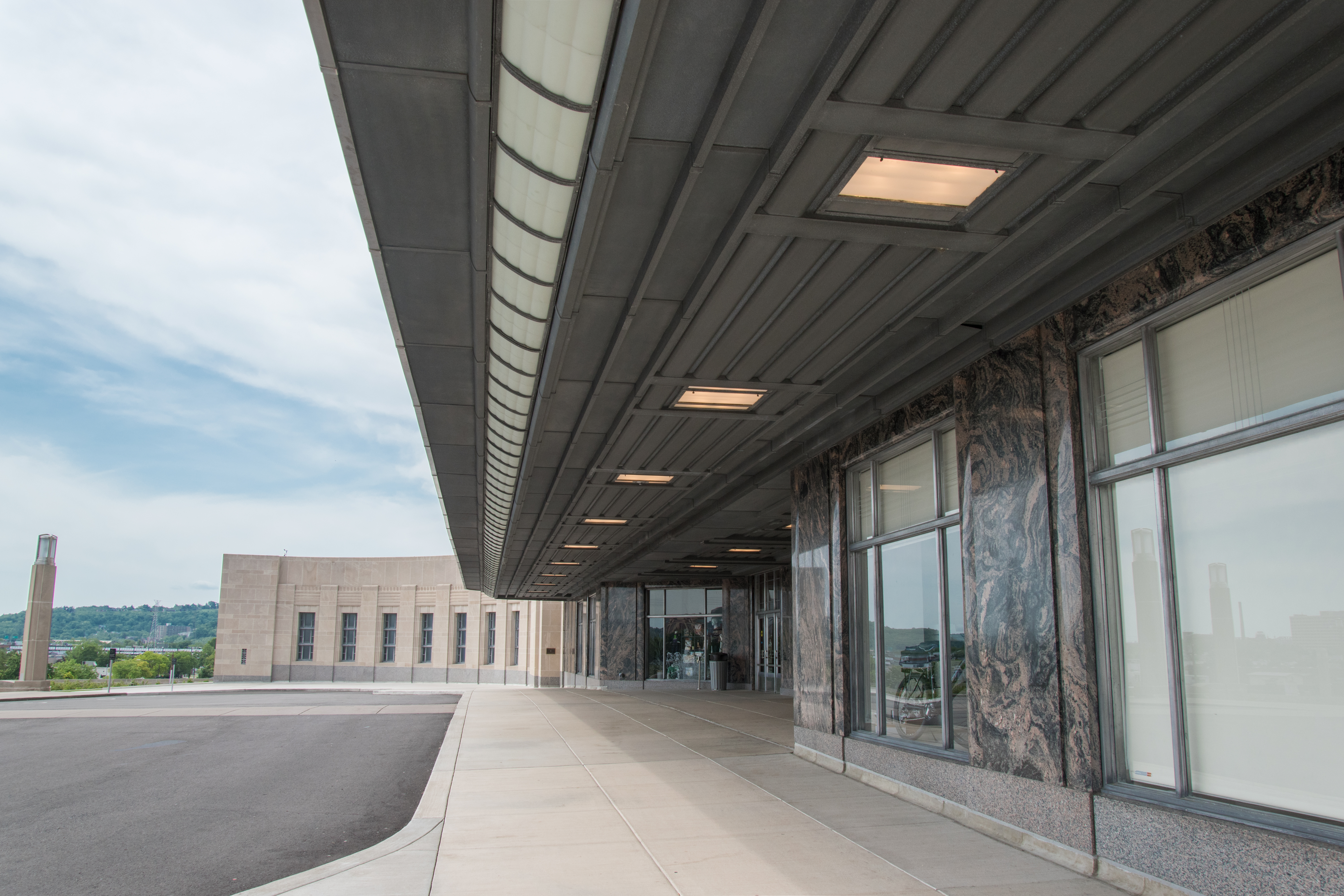
Marquee

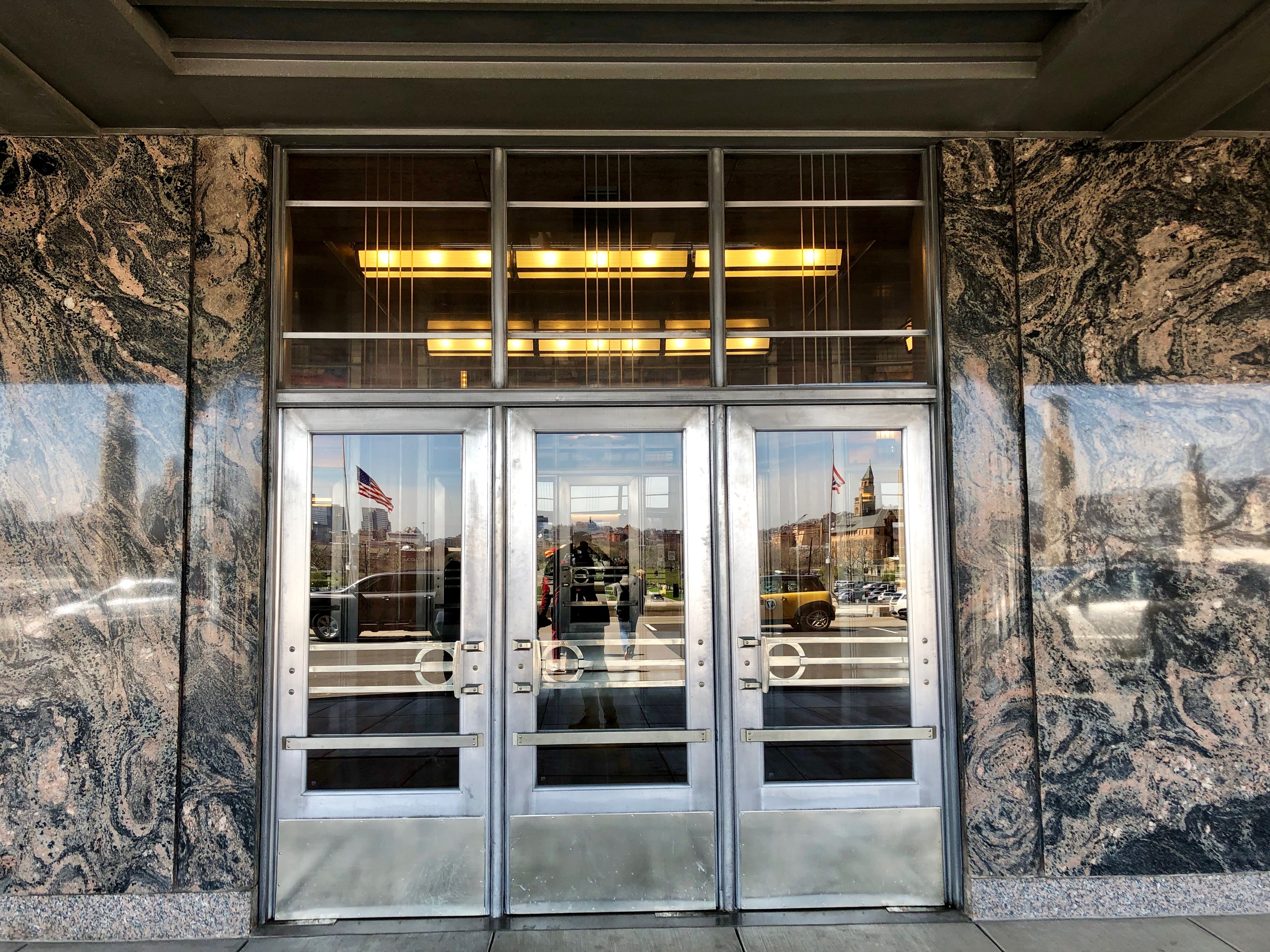
Main entry doors

The fountain

The Ohio Historical Marker

==== Exterior materials ====
The building has a steel frame, masonry curtain walls, and concrete floors and roof slabs.

The entire east facade and the outer walls of the entrance drives are faced with a light, fine-grained Indiana limestone, with a low granite base. The low walls and pylons in front of the building are made of the same limestone. Fossils of sea lilies, bryozoans, brachiopods, snails, and other organisms can be seen in the stone. The entranceway under the marquise features Morton Gneiss, a Cold Spring dark rainbow granite. Morton Gneiss was popular in American Art Deco architecture at the time. The fountain utilizes pink porphyritic granite. The side and rear walls of the building utilize light buff brick. The dome was originally covered with terra cotta, though it was replaced with aluminum sheathing in 1945. The entrance arcades are lined with cream-colored terra cotta.

=== Related structures ===
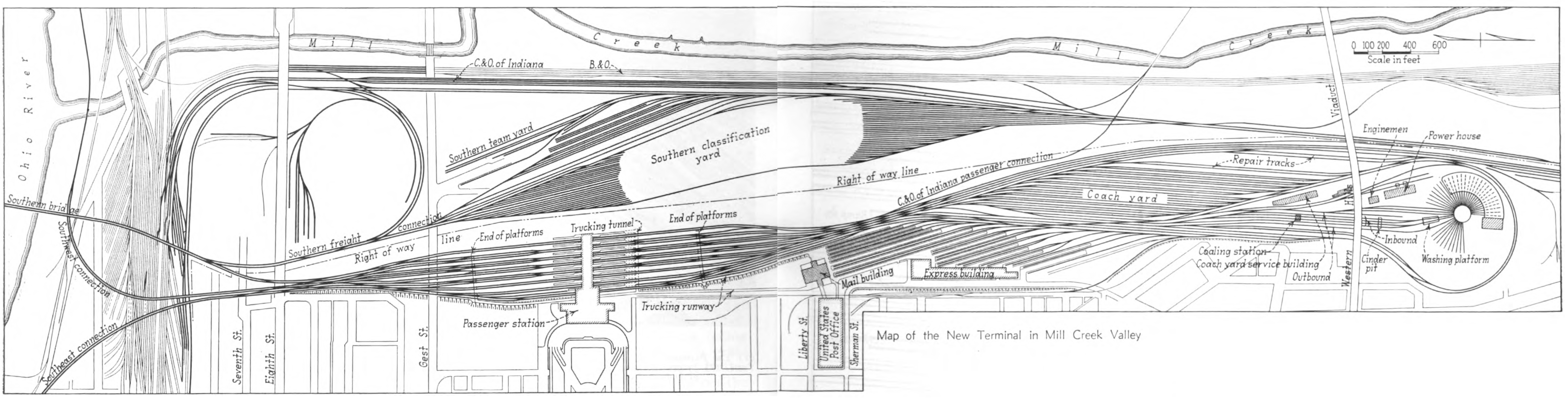
Terminal complex structures and tracks, 1933

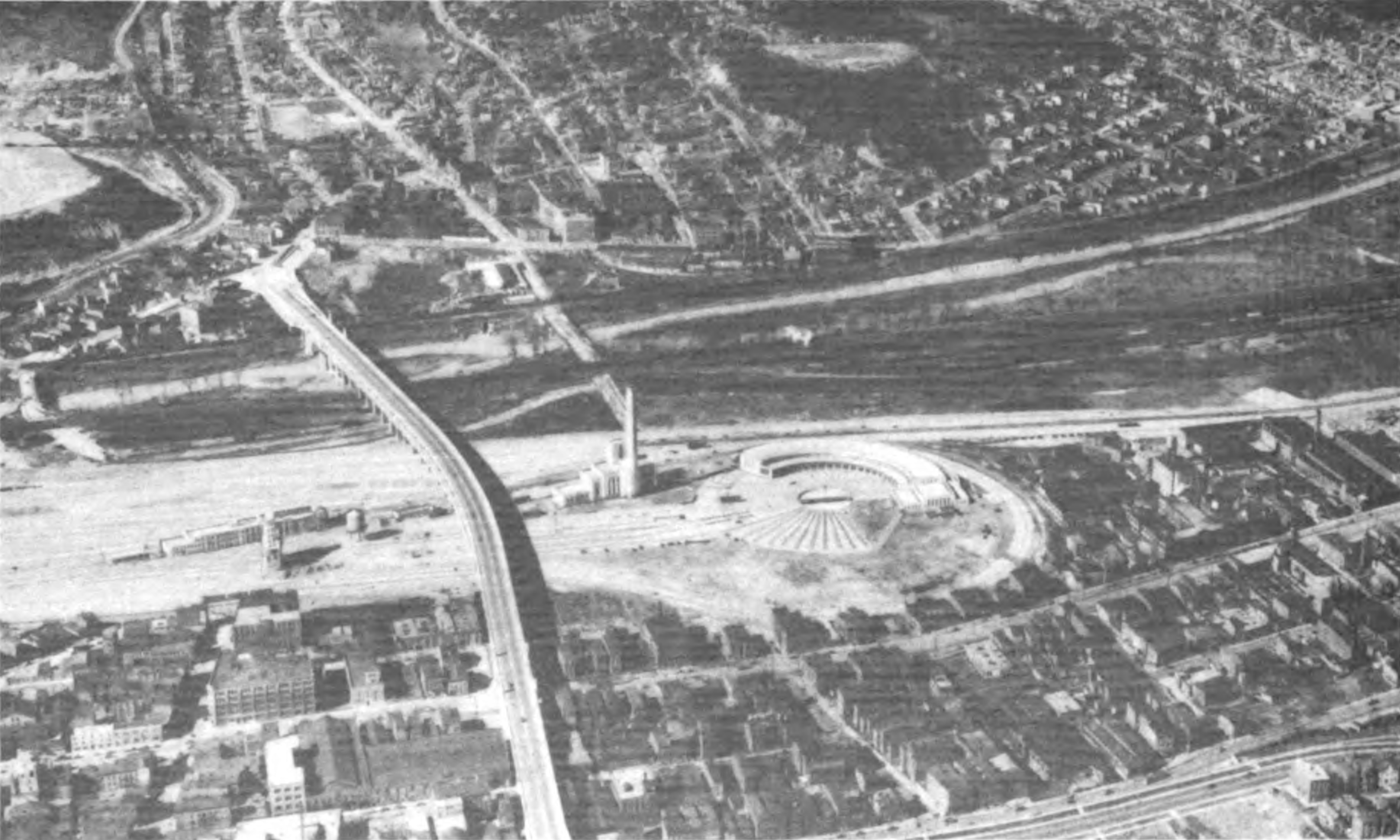
Utility buildings in 1933, left to right: coaling station and coach yard service building, power plant, and roundhouse

The terminal was built along with several auxiliary buildings, on the north side of the station, also designed in the Art Deco style. They were designed by Edgar D. Tyler, a staff architect for Fellheimer & Wagner, as well as a former student of Paul Cret.

The mail handling building and express terminals were on the east side of the terminal property, easily accessible to the city's downtown, and directly to the west and north of the Dalton Avenue U.S. Post Office, completed around 1933 and still standing.

The mail building, 173 by 178 feet (53 m × 54 m), was a steel-frame, flat-roofed enclosure for chutes and conveyor belts. The building was also connected to the post office through conveyor belts, delivering city mail separate from transfer mail; the post office in turn delivered outgoing mail split between northern and southern railways. The mail building had two platforms each with two conveyors and serving two tracks, one platform for southbound mail and one for northbound mail.

The express terminal was 742 feet (226 m) long, ranging from 40–136 feet (12–41 m) wide. The building was two stories tall, steel-framed, with brick walls and concrete floors and roofs. The second floor was used for offices and storage. It also included platforms with canopies.

The terminal complex also included a roundhouse, washing platform, cinder pit, fire-lighting stations, coaling station, two electric substations, a power plant, and a water treatment plant. The roundhouse had 20 indoor stalls, 17 outdoor spaces, and a turntable with a 115-foot (35 m) diameter. The power plant had a 250-foot chimney and a set of three boilers. The plant's basement housed a water treatment plant, which used zeolite to purify city water, softening the water.

=== Interior layout and architecture ===
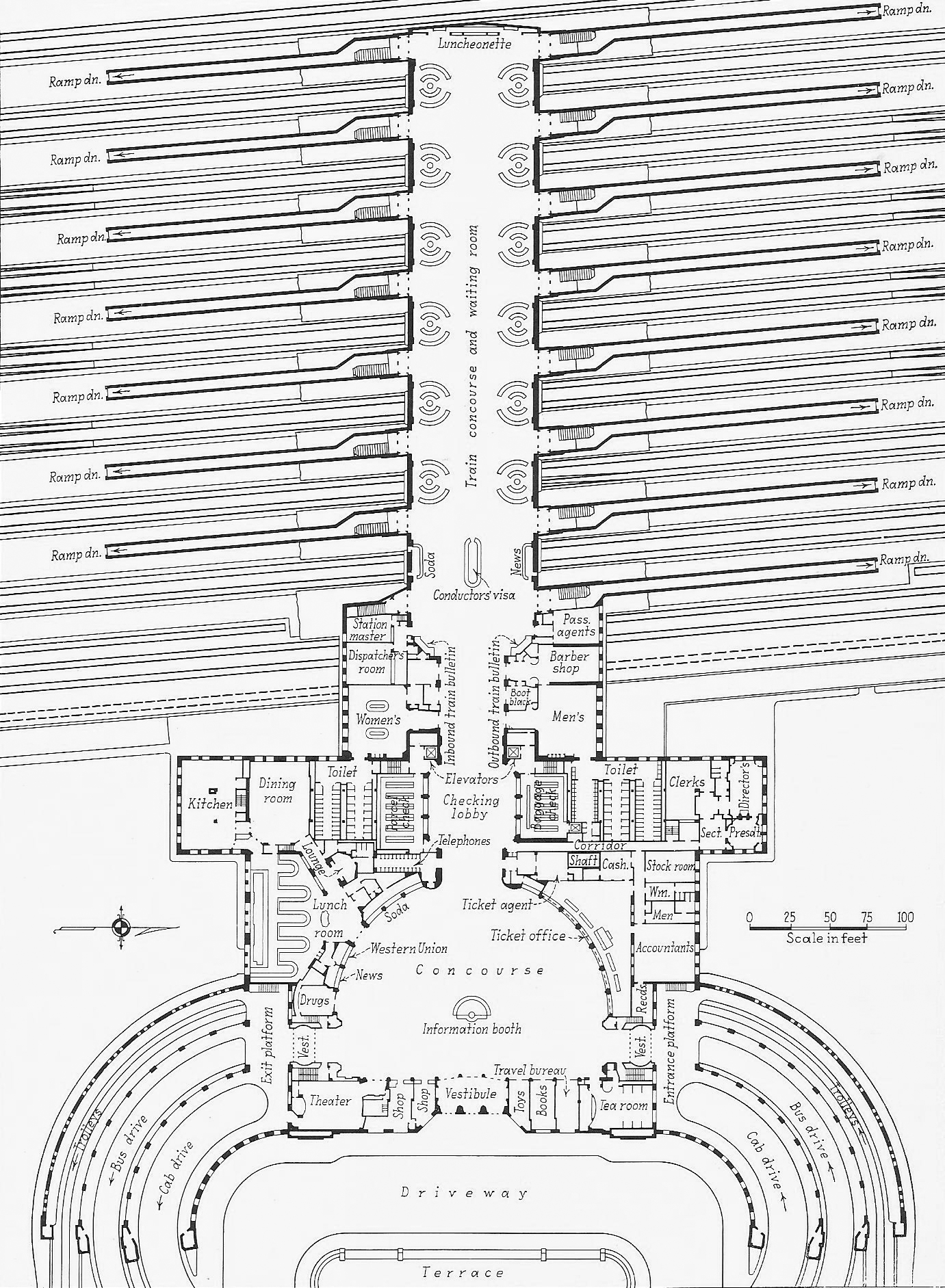
Original main level floorplan

Contrasting with the exterior's simple color scheme, the building's interior is characterized by bright, warm colors, intensified with natural light in daytime and with illumination at night. These colors and lighting contrast with the interior's simple form and detail. Most of the interior metal work is made of aluminum, including doors, signs, ticket grills, and light fixtures.

The floor was consistently patterned in the rotunda, through the checking lobby, and into and through the train concourse. The pattern was terrazzo divided by brass strips into bands and panels in shades of gray and rose. The contrasting flooring was laid out in way that guided traffic to and from the main entrance and platforms.

All interior spaces were designed without visible heating or cooling units. Hot air would be vented into the train concourse behind light fixtures. The ramps were also heated, to prevent drafts of cold air from entering the concourse. The rotunda's vestibules were also heated, and the central space was indirectly heated: the space between the inner plaster dome and outer cement dome was heated, as well as the space between the east facade's two panes of glass. This would surround the rotunda with warm air, insulating it from the cold.

==== Rotunda ====
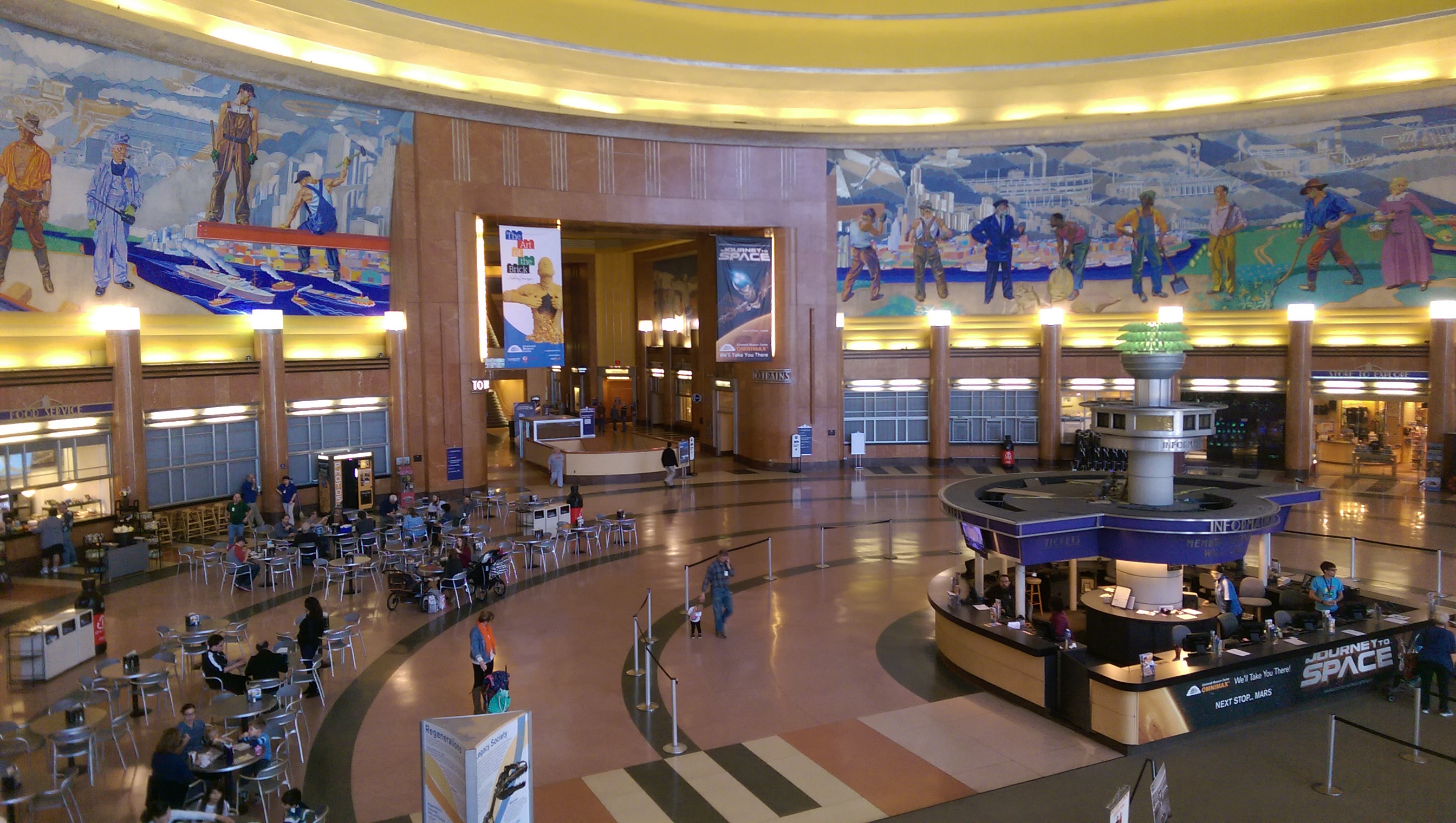
Rotunda from the east balcony

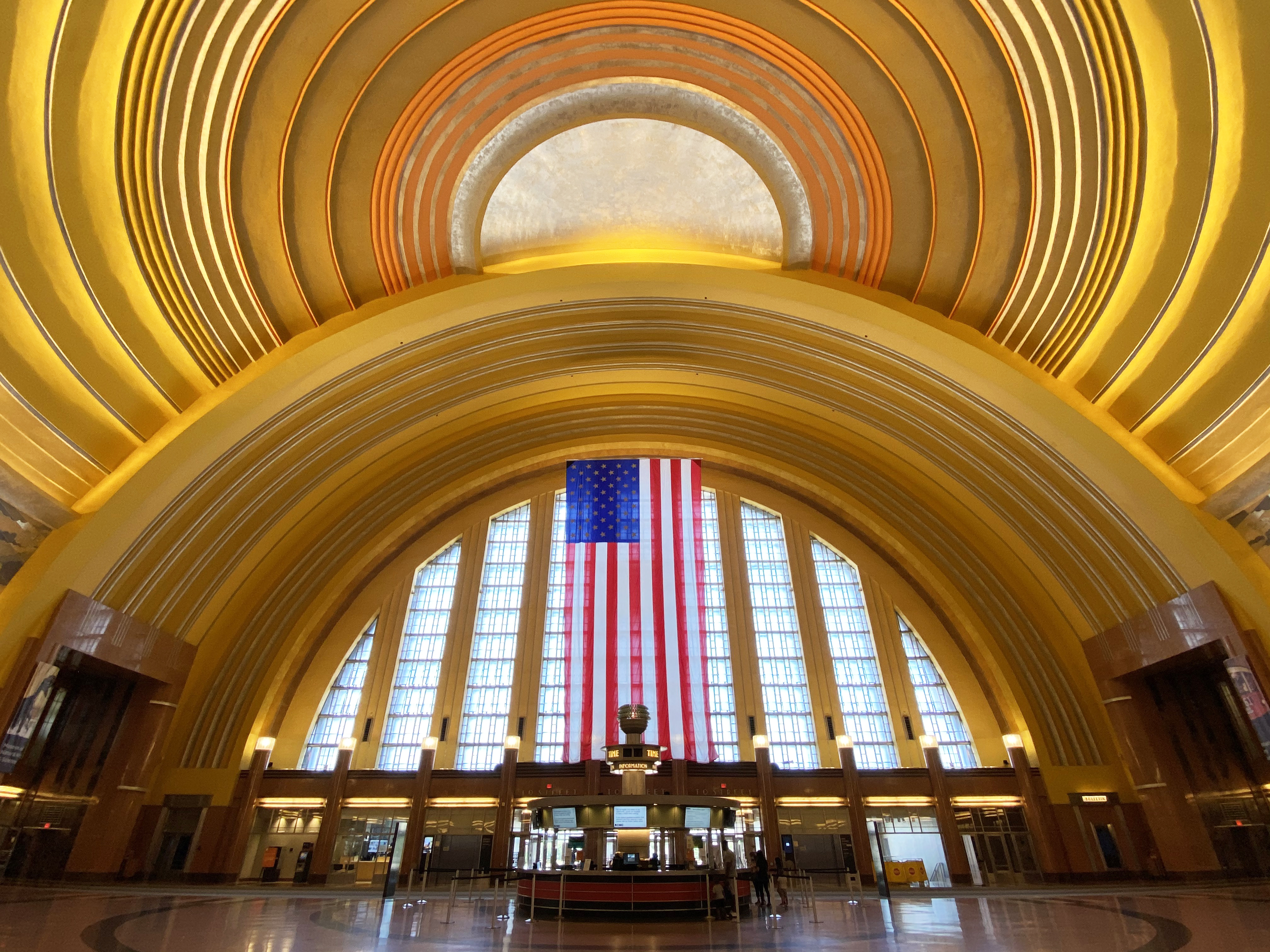
East wall of the Rotunda

The main entrance leads to a small marble vestibule, which leads to the terminal's main concourse, the Rotunda. It is a semi-circular space measuring 176 feet (54 m) wide, 125 feet (38 m) deep, and 106 feet (32 m) tall. The arched front of the building forms the east wall of the rotunda; the other interior walls have a high dado clad in red and yellow Verona marble, with a dark red marble trim of Tennessee marble at the base, and molded plaster used above the dado and up to the ceiling. The room's marble is 150 million years old, containing numerous fossilized skeletons. Approximately 24 of these fossils are visible in the walls of the Rotunda. Sound-absorbing plaster covers the dome ceiling, which has yellow and orange plaster banded with silver strips. The room is designed with Art Deco details like the other original portions of the building. It was designed with colorful pastels, and features colorful mosaic murals by Winold Reiss.

The rotunda's semi-circular central information desk and ticket kiosk originally served as a newsstand and tobacco shop, and was originally the only structure in the rotunda. It features a decorative sphere and a digital clock, possibly the first digital clock installed in a public space. The clock is no longer functioning.

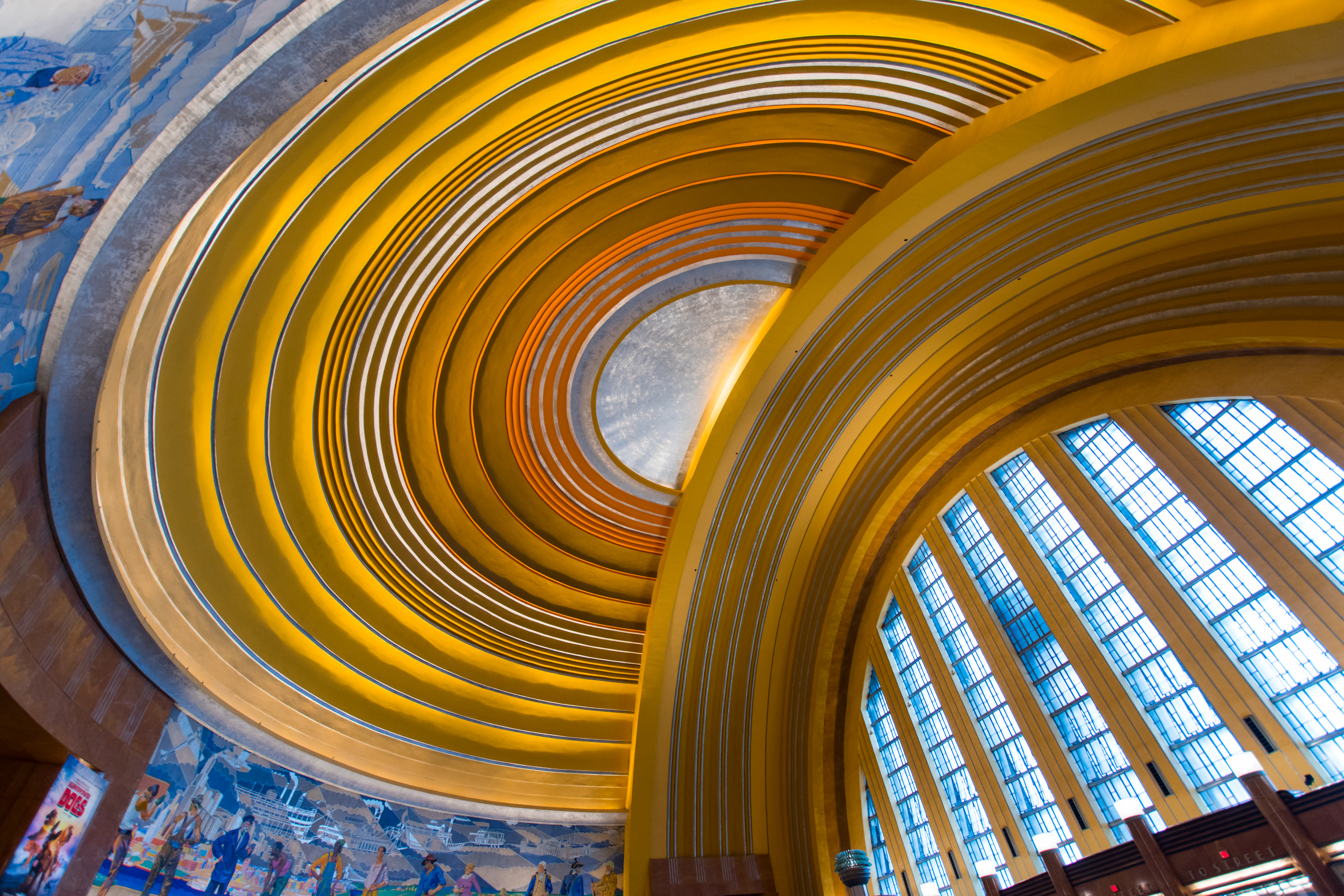
Rotunda ceiling

The northern curved wall housed 18 ticket windows, while the southern curved wall had a soda fountain, telegraph counter, drug store, and the entrance to the terminal's two dining rooms. The east wall included four shops, a travel bureau, the Rookwood Tea Room, and a small theater. The shops were for men's apparel, women's apparel, books, and toys. The toy shop had star and moon light fixtures that reflected colors from the ceiling onto the toys, which were depicted in patterns on the shop's floor.

The rotunda features a seemingly unlikely whispering gallery. The east wall's arch around its windows features decorated flues, elements typical in Art Deco design. The flues act as sound channels, allowing people 30 meters apart at the base of each arch, by symmetrical drinking fountains, to hold a private conversation with ease.

The Rotunda features the largest semi-dome in the Western Hemisphere, measuring 180 feet (55 m) wide and 106 feet (32 m) high (about ten stories in height). It was considered the largest in the world until 1973, when the Sydney Opera House was built.

==== Train concourse ====
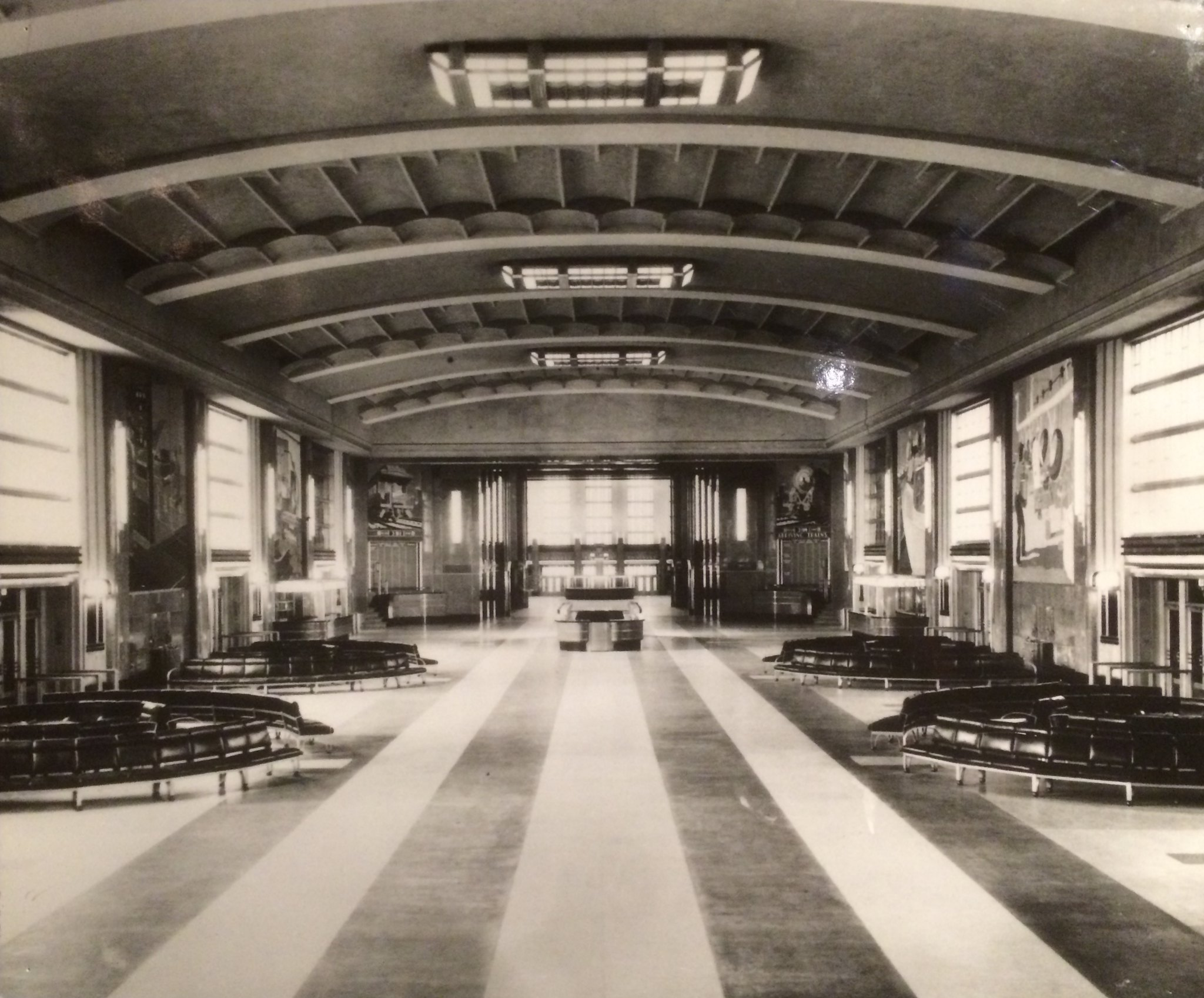
Train concourse, 1933

The train concourse, demolished in 1974, measured 79 by 410 feet (24 m × 125 m). It lay directly above the railroad tracks, and had doors on its north and south sides, eight on each side. The sixteen gates each led to stairs and ramps to the platforms below. The concourse was well-lit with tall windows throughout. The room carried on the same marble pattern of the rotunda walls, and had a segmental arch ceiling 36 feet, 8.5 inches above the floor at the crown, painted in shades of yellow from pale lemon to orange. The room was used as a waiting area, though it lacked traditional wooden benches. Instead it had American Oak Leather-upholstered settees and chairs in aluminum frames, placed in twelve concentric groups of 46 seats, each around a small, round teakwood table. A conductors' visa counter was installed at the east end of the concourse at its longitudinal center. The room featured the Winold Reiss industrial murals, commissioned for the space, as well as a large map mural, the only artwork original to the terminal that was demolished. The concourse's west end had a large clock, also saved from demolition. The clock was moved to an outdoor domed display in the Town Center parking garage, near Cincinnati Music Hall. In 2018, workers removed the clock from the garage and delivered it to the Museum Center, which plans to assess the clock's condition and decide where to display it. The entrance to the concourse had two train bulletin boards; a departure chalkboard at the north side and an arrivals chalkboard at the south side. One Reiss mural decorated the space above each board: a departing train above the departures and an arriving train above the arrivals.

==== Platforms and tracks ====
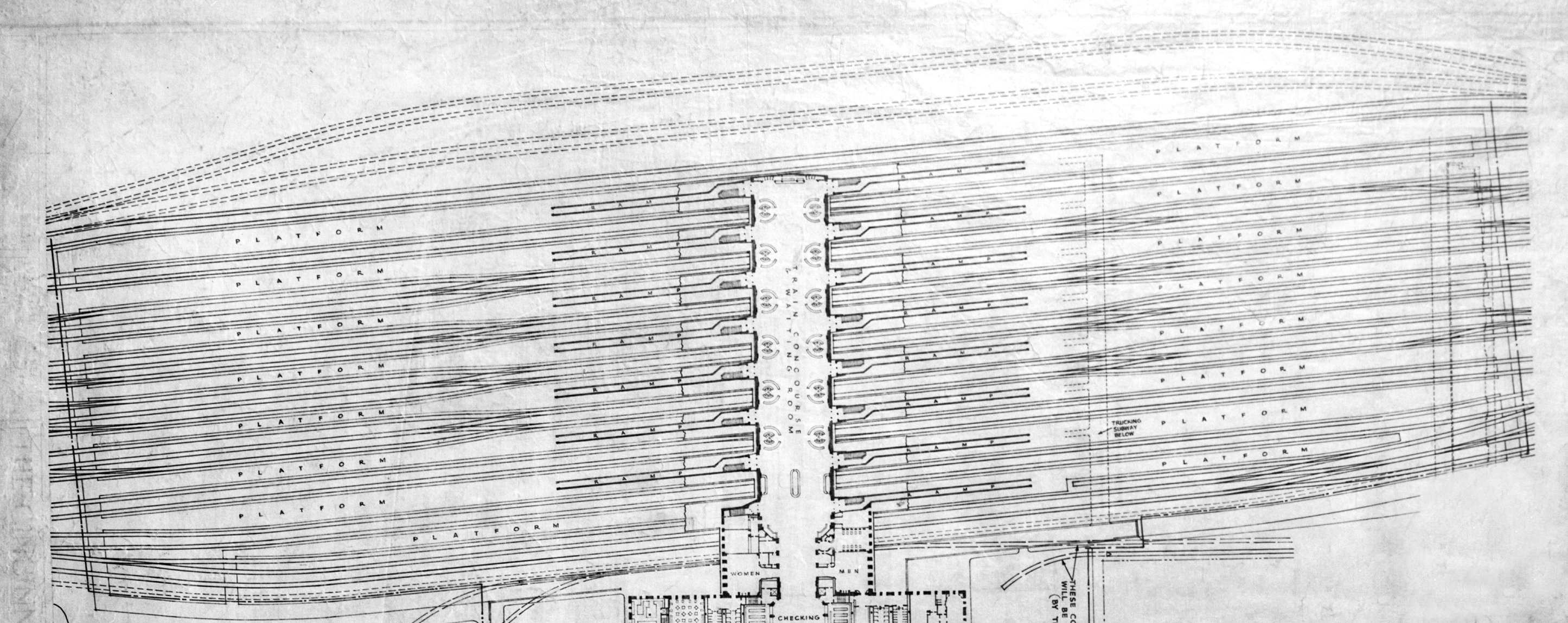
1931 platform and track schematic

The terminal was built with eight platforms and sixteen platform tracks, with room for expansion to 22 tracks. The platforms and tracks ran north to south, partially beneath the train concourse. The platforms were 28 feet (8.5 m) wide, unusual in train station design, and 1,580 feet (480 m) long, and able to be extended to 2,400 feet. They had concrete bases, covered with canopies. The support columns were 80 feet apart, also noted as unusual. The canopies were of painted steel; roofing was by the Philip Carey Company.

Parking tracks were installed between the platform tracks, as there was sufficient room between the platforms. These tracks allowed for sleeping cars and express cars to be exchanged.

==== Baggage facilities ====
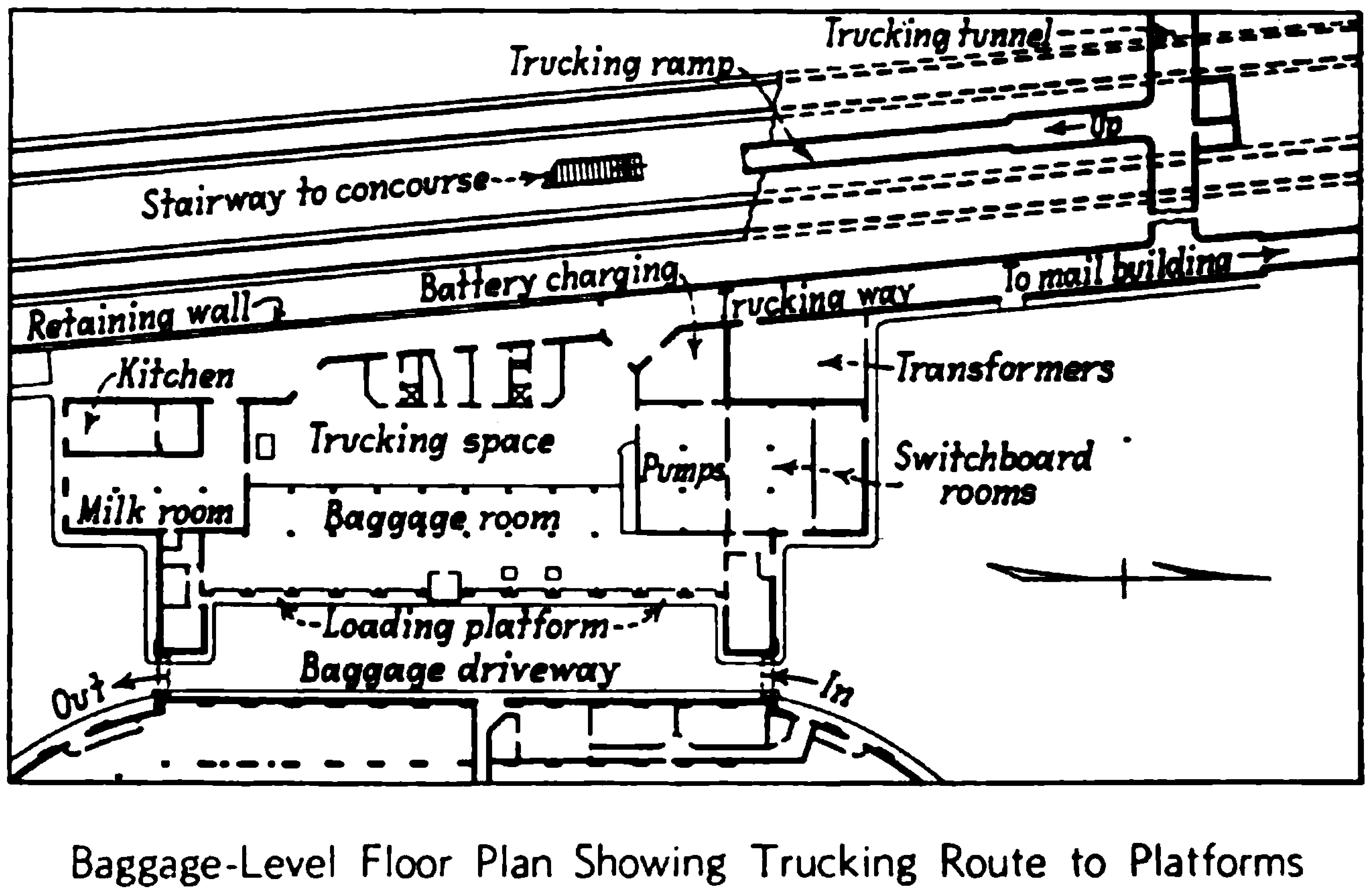
1933 floorplan of the baggage level

The baggage level occupied space directly beneath the checking lobby and train concourse. The space also utilized a drive-through loading platform, where cars would enter the north side of the baggage level, drop off luggage on the loading platform, and exit the south side. Trucking ramps were located directly beneath the train concourse's northern passenger ramps, and a passageway connected the facility to the mail handling building.

==== Tower A ====
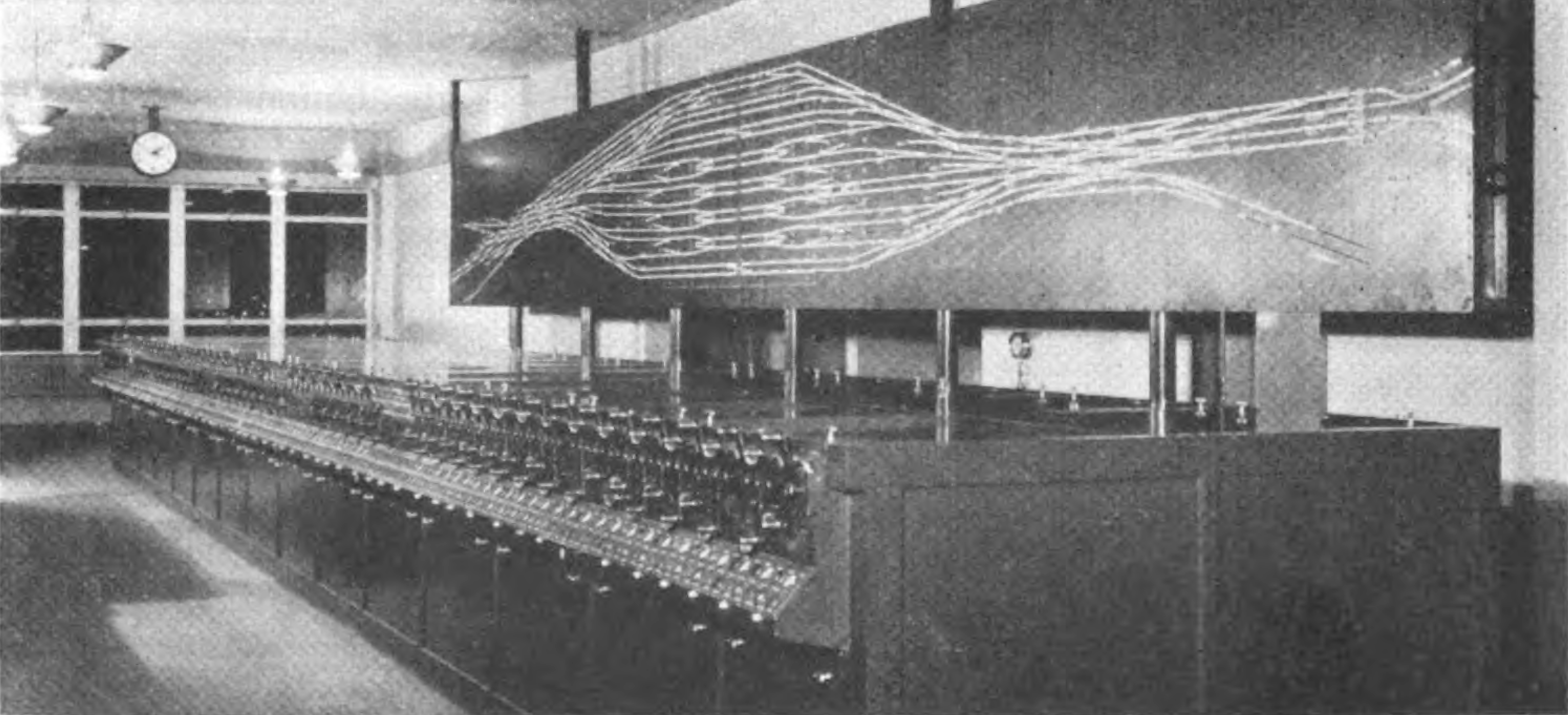
Tower A interlocking machine,
c. 1933

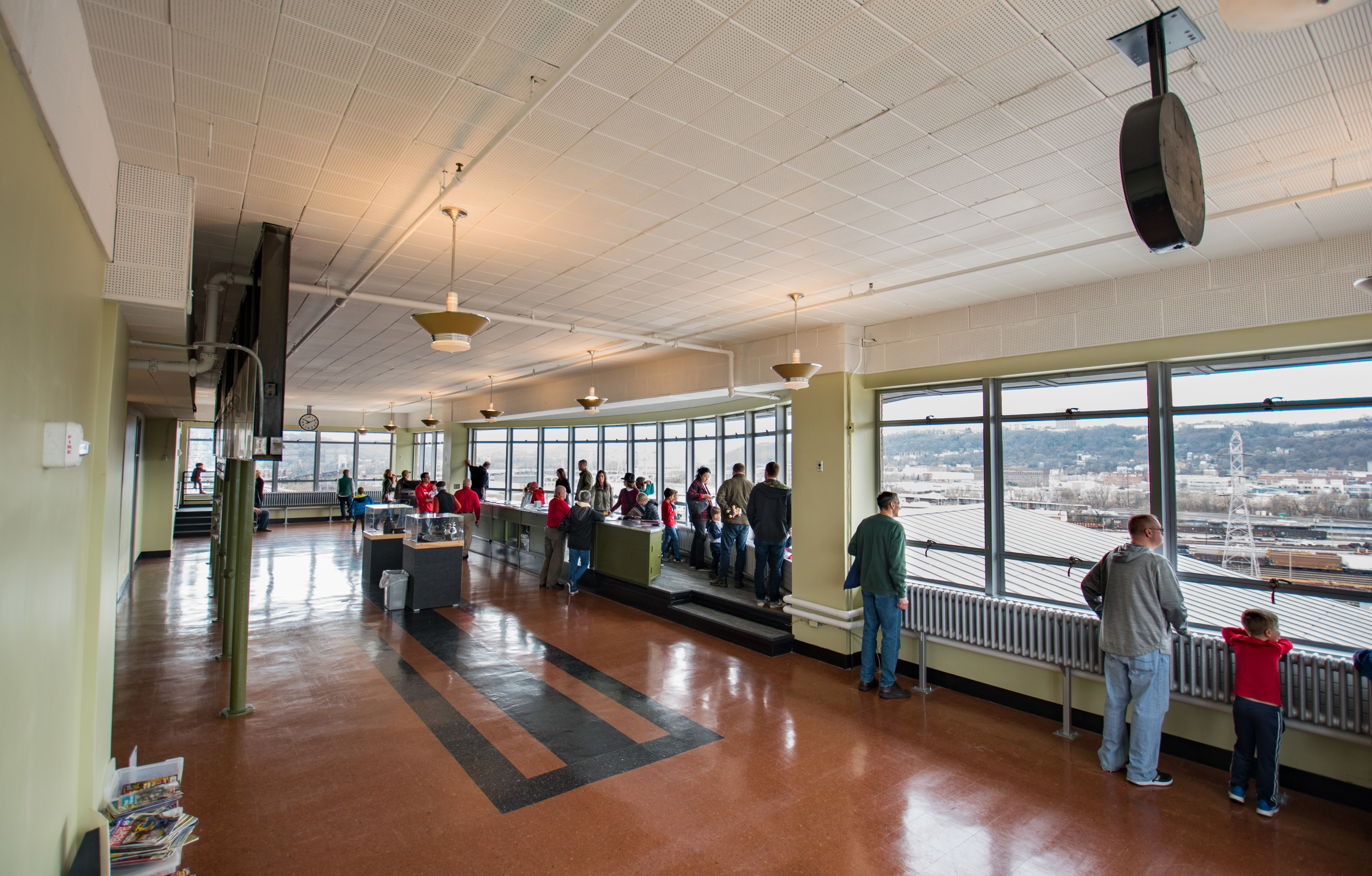
The space today

Tower A, a former signal tower, is open to the public as a railroad exhibit once per year. The tower is located on the fourth and fifth floors at the east end of the station, with sets of windows on the north, east, and south. It overlooks the Gest Street rail yard as well as a mile north and south, including part of Queensgate Yard. The room was noise-insulated with cork linoleum and Celotex due to its once-frequent exposure to passenger trains. The tower featured a large electro-pneumatic interlocking machine, built by the Union Switch & Signal Company. The machine had 187 levers, making it the largest interlocking machine in service at the time. Light bulbs underneath each switch indicated information. Above the machine was an illuminated track model.

From 1989 to 2018, the Cincinnati Railroad Club occupied the space, offering public access to the space and operating a museum for the rail yard and station's innovative interlocking system. The club had been meeting in the terminal since 1938. In 1989, the club refurbished the space, installed exhibits there, and staffed it on weekends with volunteers beginning in 1991. Since the terminal's 2018 renovation, the club was required to pay rent, something that was mandatory for tax credits for the renovation. The club could not afford the rent terms and thus vacated the space. In late 2019, the museum center opened the space for a few weeks for the holiday season, staffed by Cincinnati Railroad Club volunteers. The club plans to raise money to have the space open more often in the next five years.

==== Foodservice spaces ====
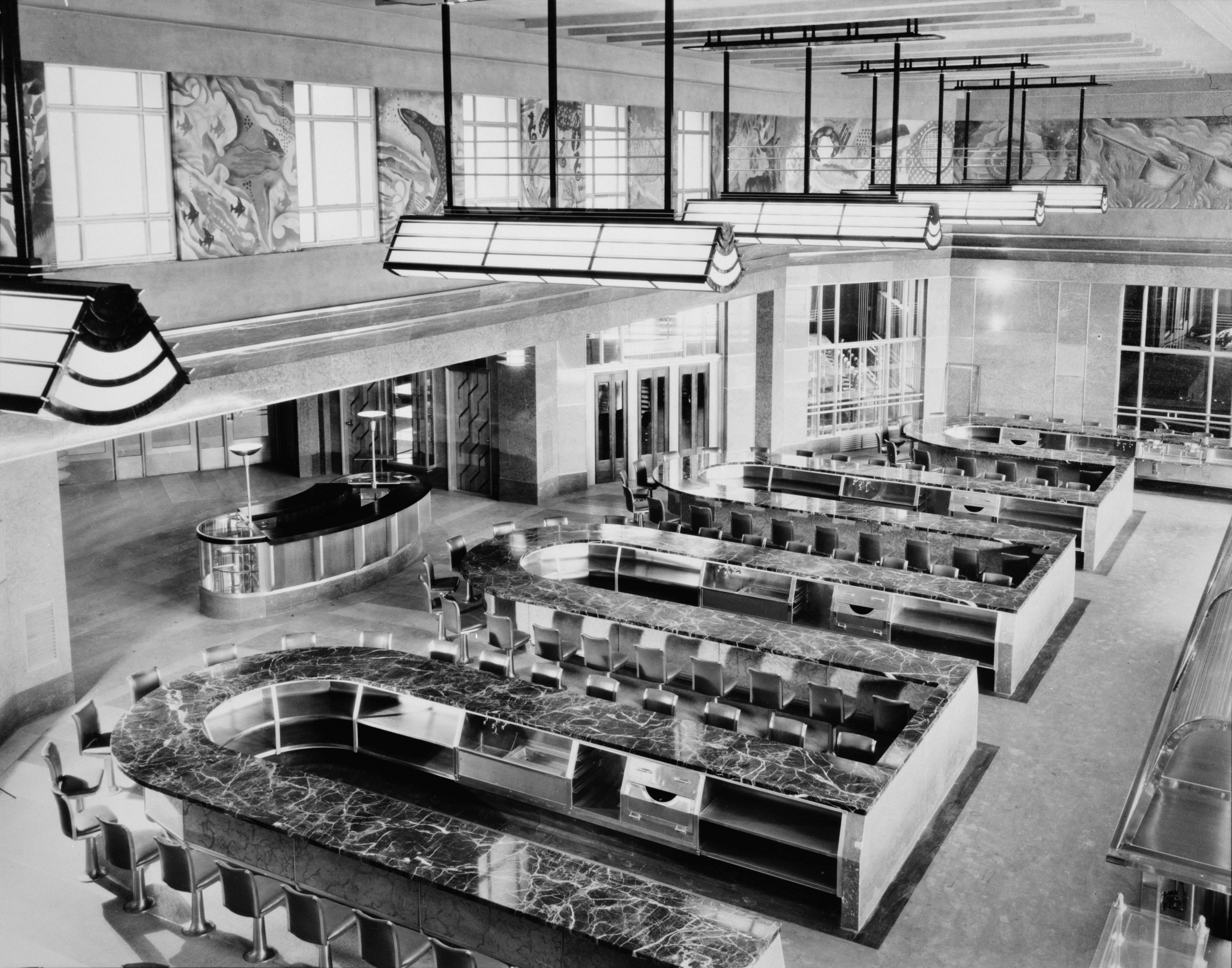
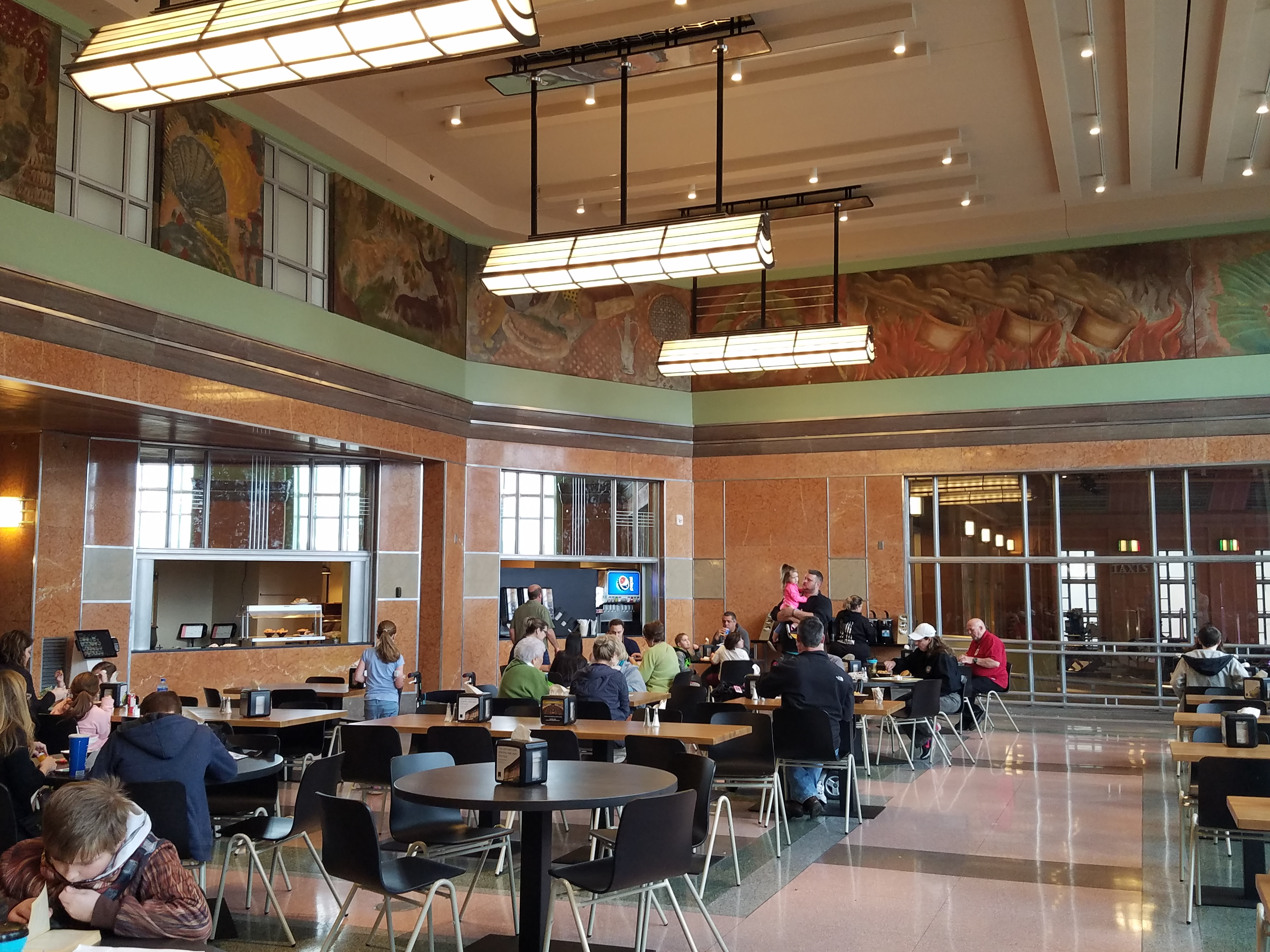
Lunchroom, c. 1933 and 2019

The Rookwood tea room is decorated entirely in Rookwood Pottery tiles. It is located directly off of the Rotunda, and is currently a Graeter's ice cream parlor. The room opened in 1933 as a parlor for tea, coffee, and light snacks. It operated as a USO center during World War II, and afterward was used for different functions, including foodservice and as a game room. In 1980, the room became a G.D. Ritzy's. When the museum center opened, the space became a United Dairy Farmers ice cream shop. In December 2018, the room became a Graeter's parlor. The room was designed by William E. Hentschel of the Rookwood Pottery Company, and utilized mint green, pale gray, and mauve tiles. The room has partitioned seating, and designs with dragonflies and flowers.

The south side of the main level has a kitchen, dining room, and lunchroom. The lunchroom, now known as the Losantiville Dining Room, has relatively high yellow Verona marble walls, with a band of green above it, and a chocolate-brown ceiling. The countertops used Vermont verd antique; stools were aluminum and red leather. The lunchroom featured 22 murals, restored in the 2018 renovation; they had been removed around the 1980s to prevent further damage. The ceiling mural in the room's vestibule was also cleaned, and new green terrazzo was installed in the floor to show where the serpentine lunch counters were. The dining room had a large ceiling mural depicting a map of Cincinnati and neighboring parts of Kentucky. The kitchen and dining room were initially separated by a very early iteration of an automatic door.

==== Other interior spaces ====
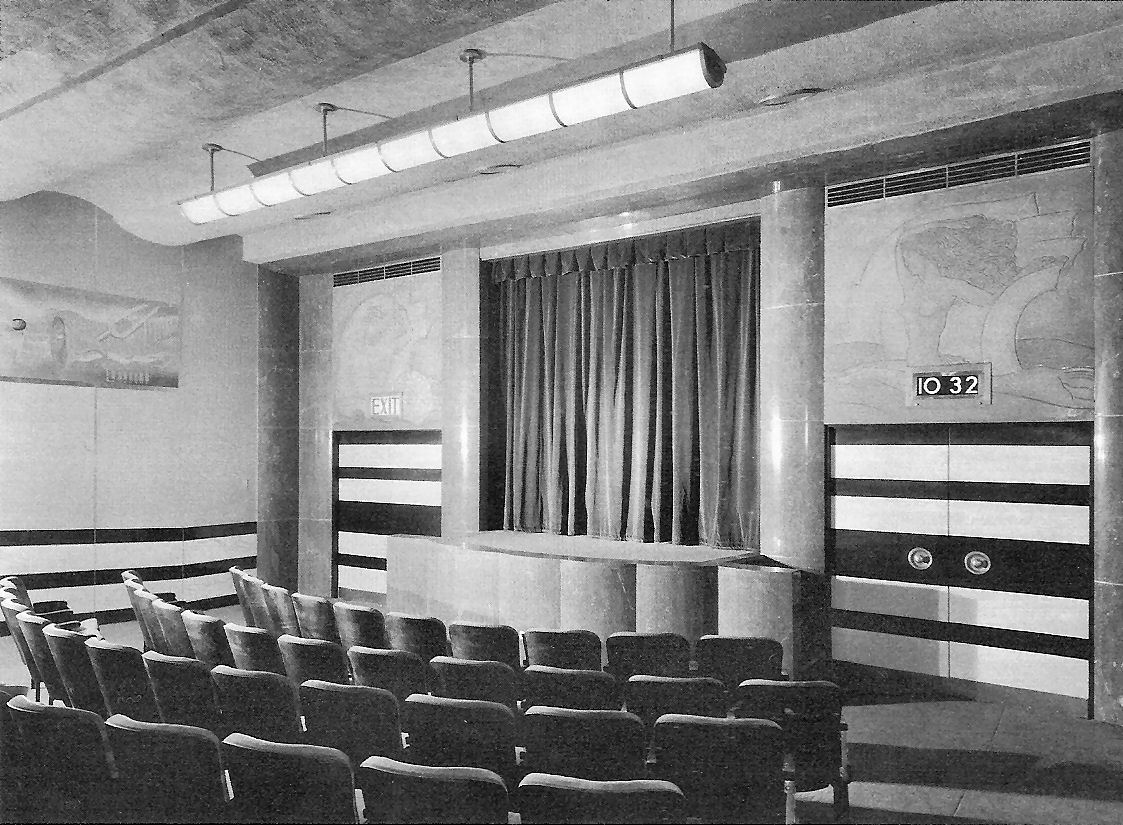
Theater

A small 118-seat theater is at the entrance of the terminal. It reopened around 1991 as the Scripps Howard Newsreel Theater, showing free features, newsreels, and a video history of the terminal. It uses white and black marble walls, with linoleum carvings on either side of the main screen. It originally had a mulberry-color carpet. In the 2016-2018 renovation, the original seats were cleaned and repaired, and a new projector and sound system was installed.

The north side of the main level included terminal company offices, also present in spaces above the checking lobby.

The men's and women's waiting rooms both used distinctive marbles, and featured wainscoting, with the walls above made of plywood or flexwood showing the natural grain, or in designs. The men's room walls feature a railroad motif, using zebrawood, walnut, and holly; the women's lounge had panels of zebra and madrone wood. The rooms featured aluminum and leather-backed seats. Both waiting rooms had connecting bathrooms with marble walls and several showers.

The checking lobby is a space behind the rotunda. It was originally an intermediate lobby between the rotunda and the train concourse, and served passengers with baggage checking on the north side and parcel checking on the south side. The space also included or led to restrooms, telephone booths, a shoeshine room, barber shop, newsstand, train bulletins, and a soda fountain. The upper portion of the walls are decorated with two Reiss murals depicting the terminal's construction and opening.

The president's office is circular, with flexwood walls and cork floors. A design above the doorway has a depiction of Union Terminal created from inlaid wood, including a working electric clock. The room also has a Kasota stone fireplace, above which lies a map of the United States using inlaid wood; each wood panel is indigenous to the state it depicts.

The terminal also opened with a drug store, beauty parlor, barber shop, men's clothing store, gift shop, and a small hospital.

Original features

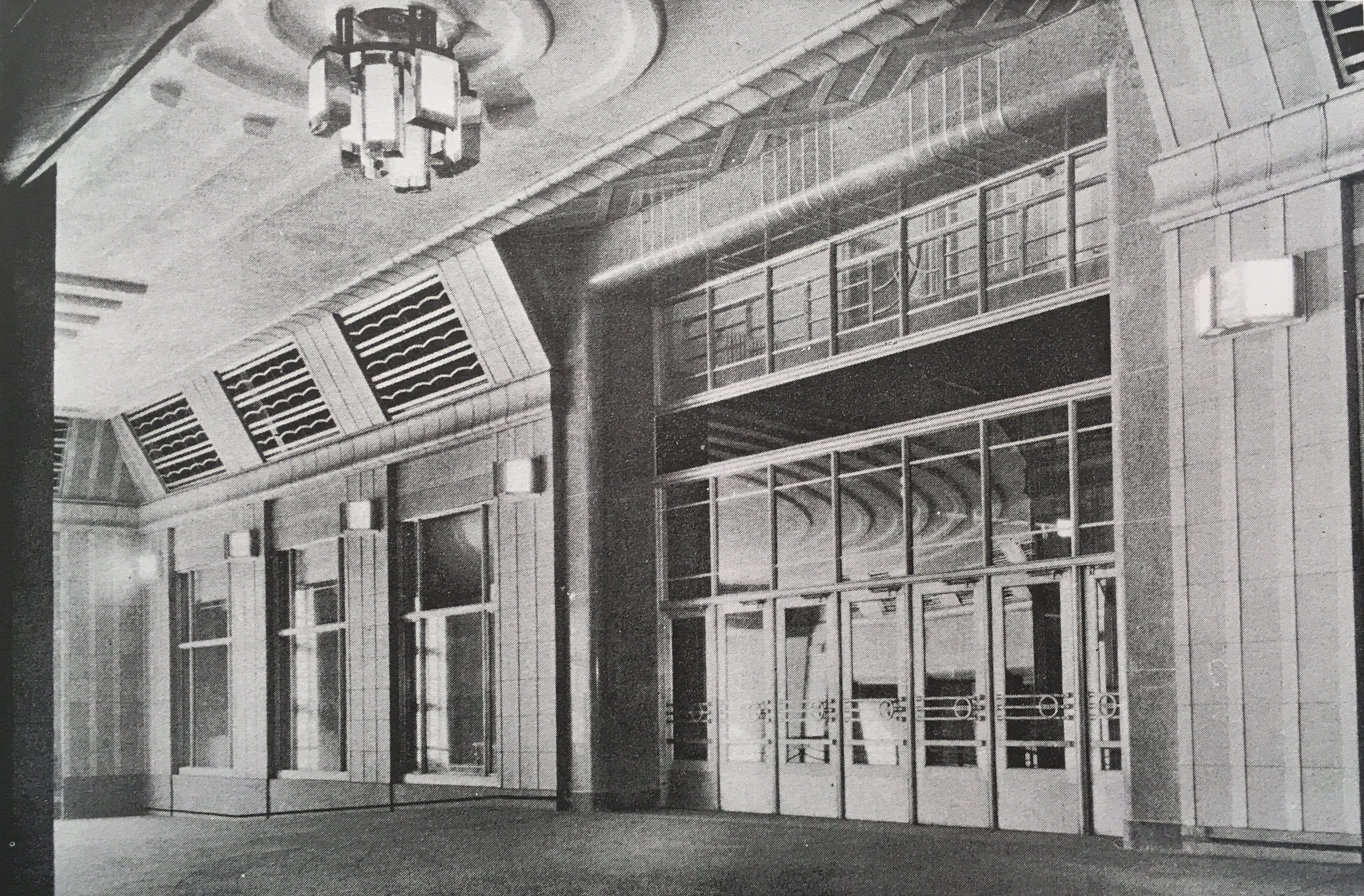
Vestibule

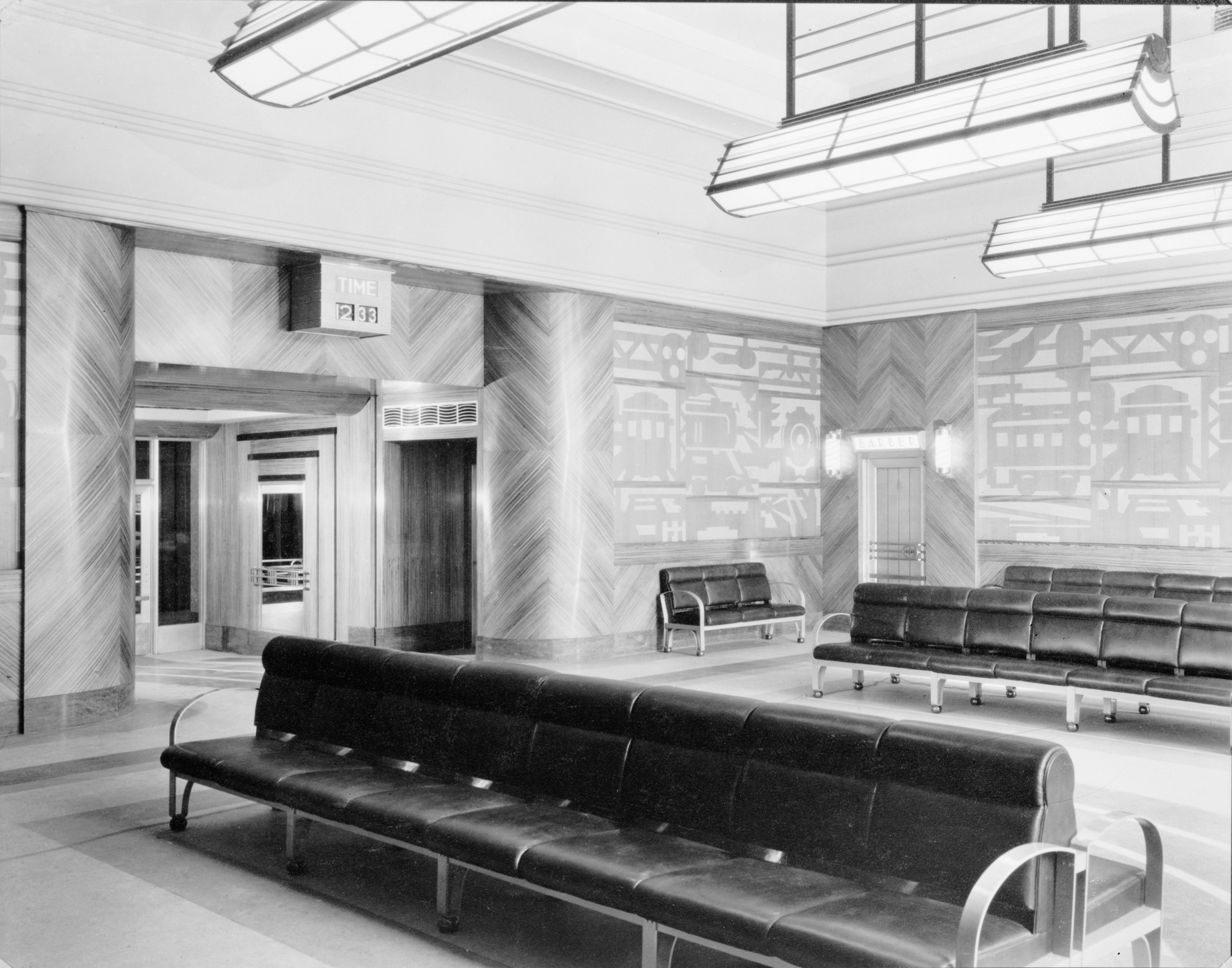
Men's Room

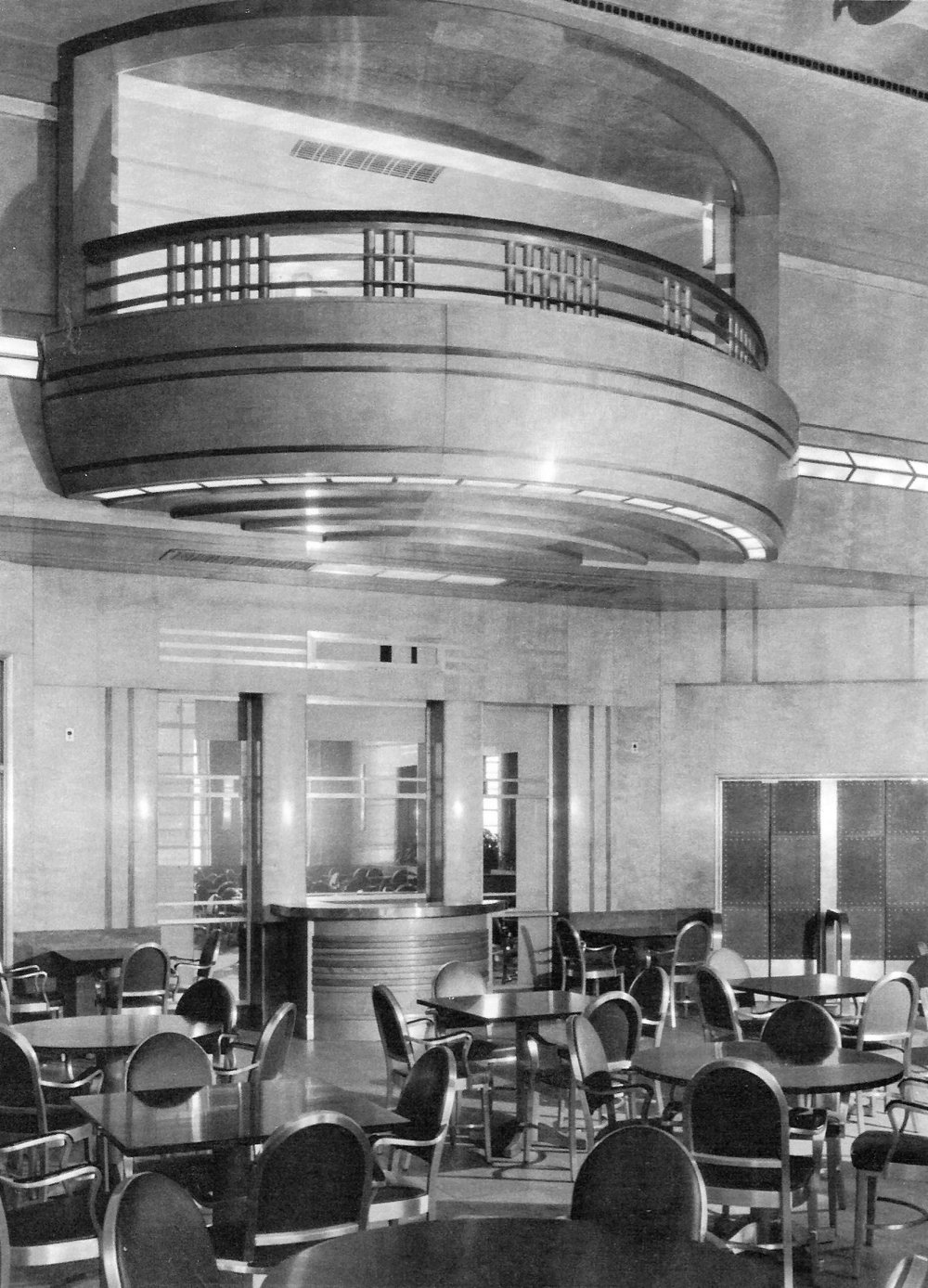
Dining Room entrance

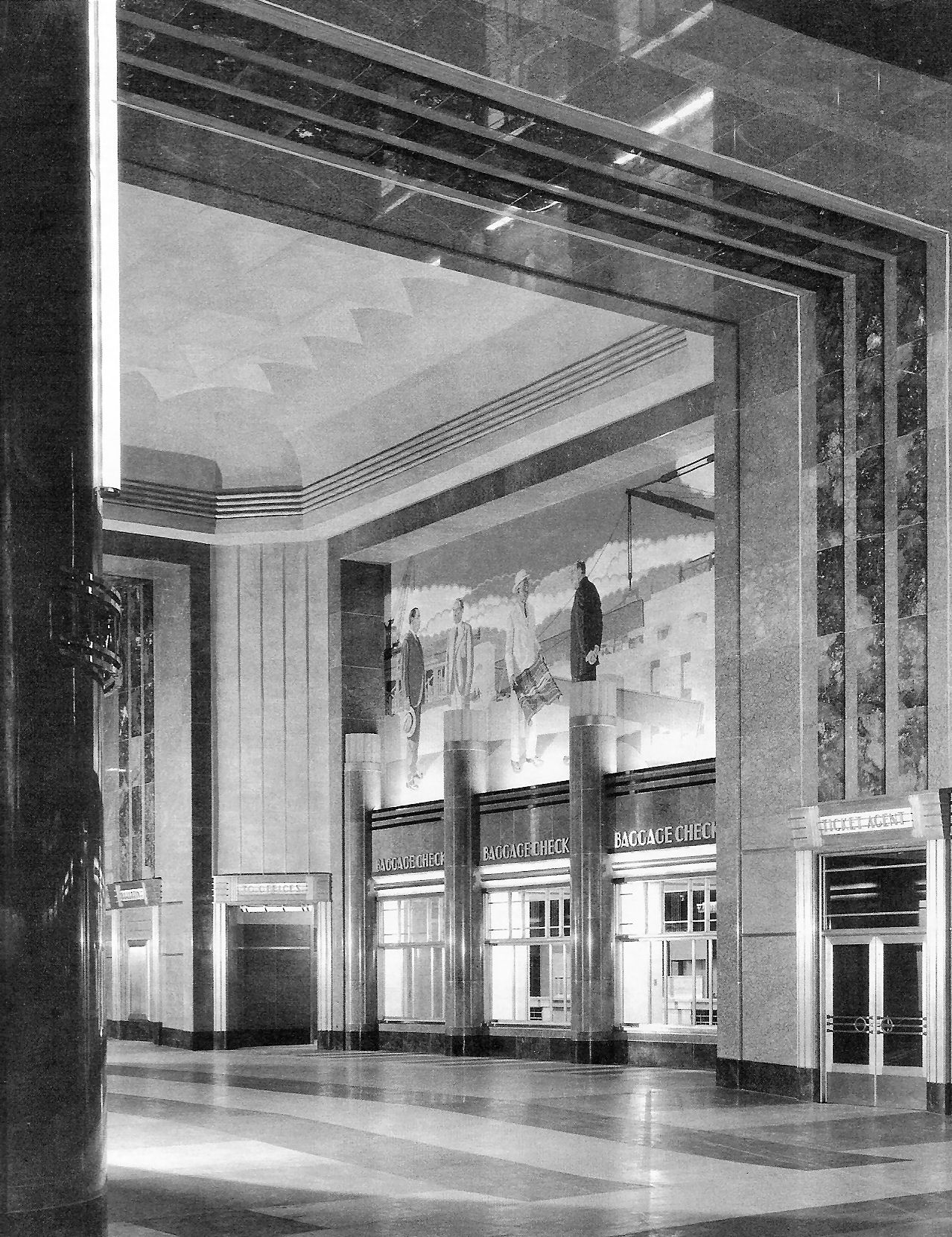
Checking Lobby

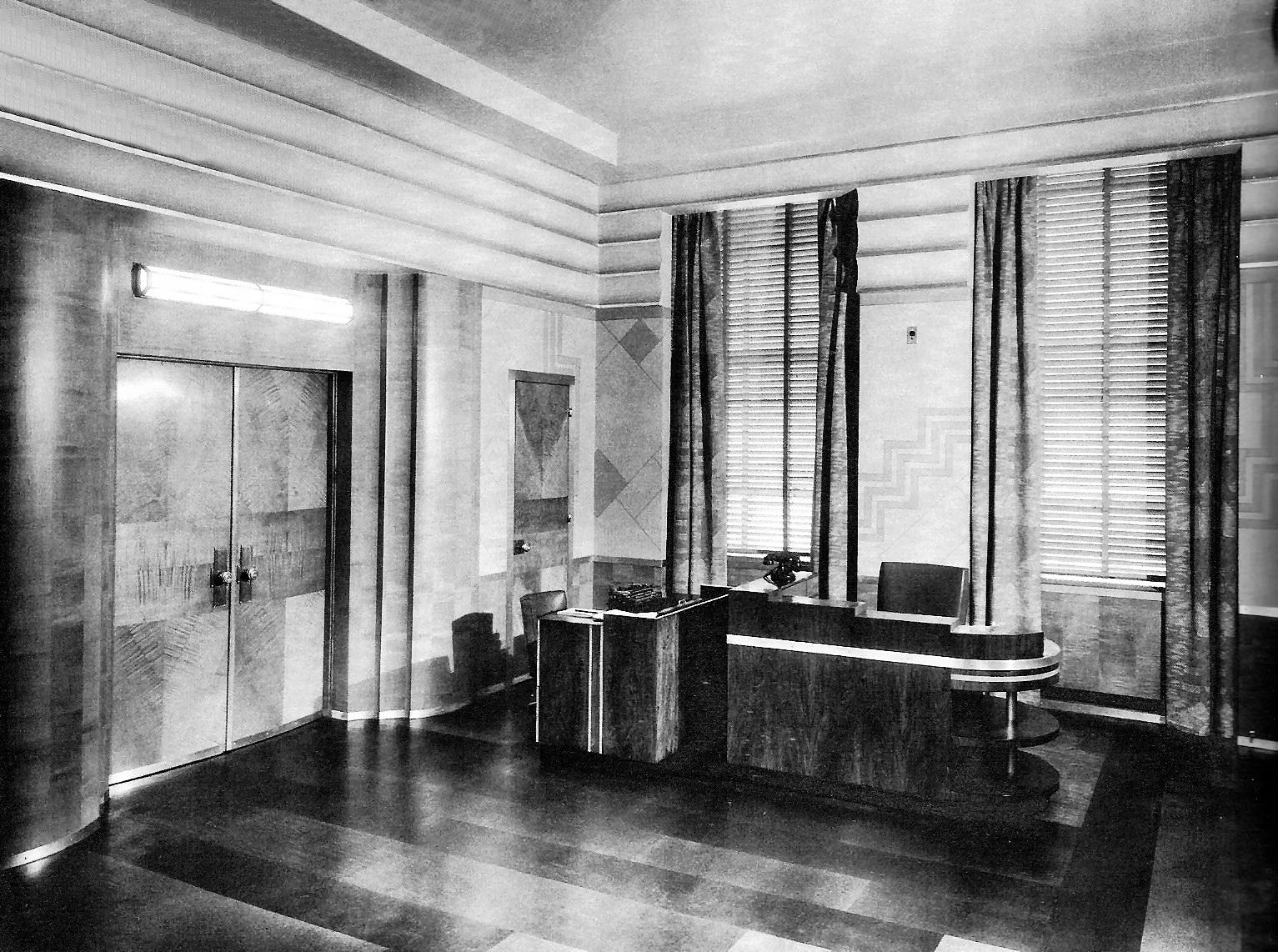
Secretary's Office

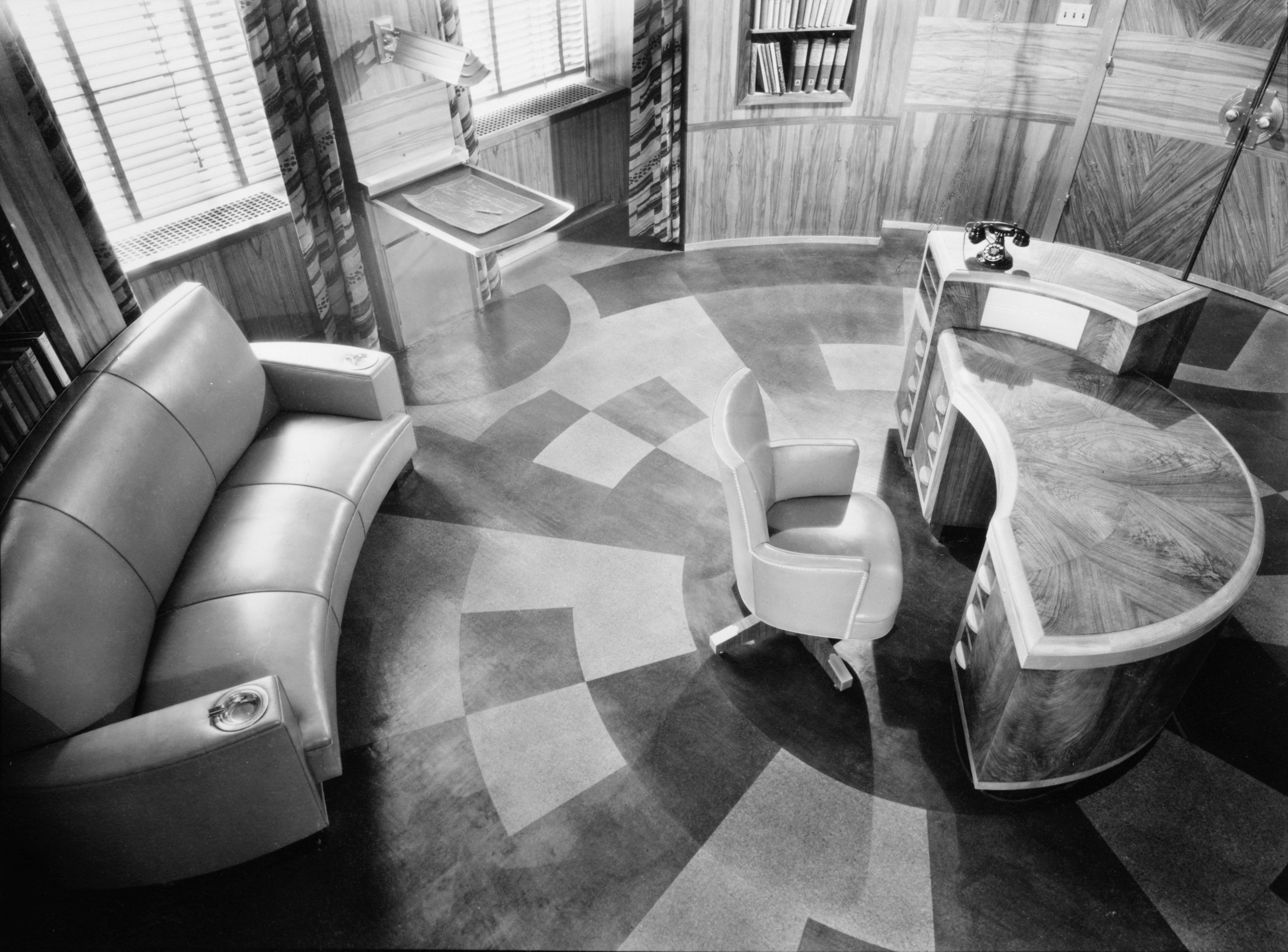
President's Office

Modern and restored spaces

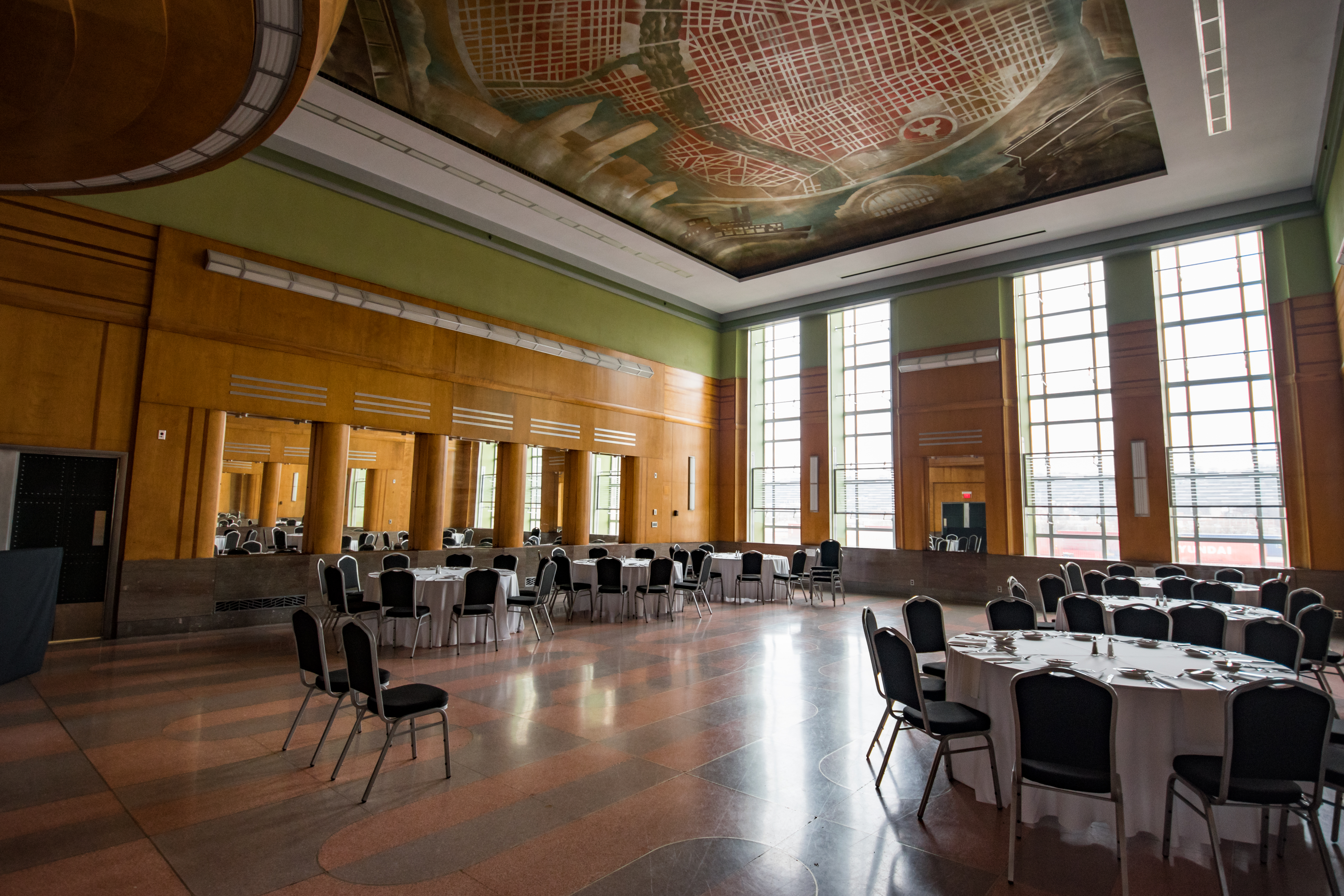
Cincinnati Dining Room

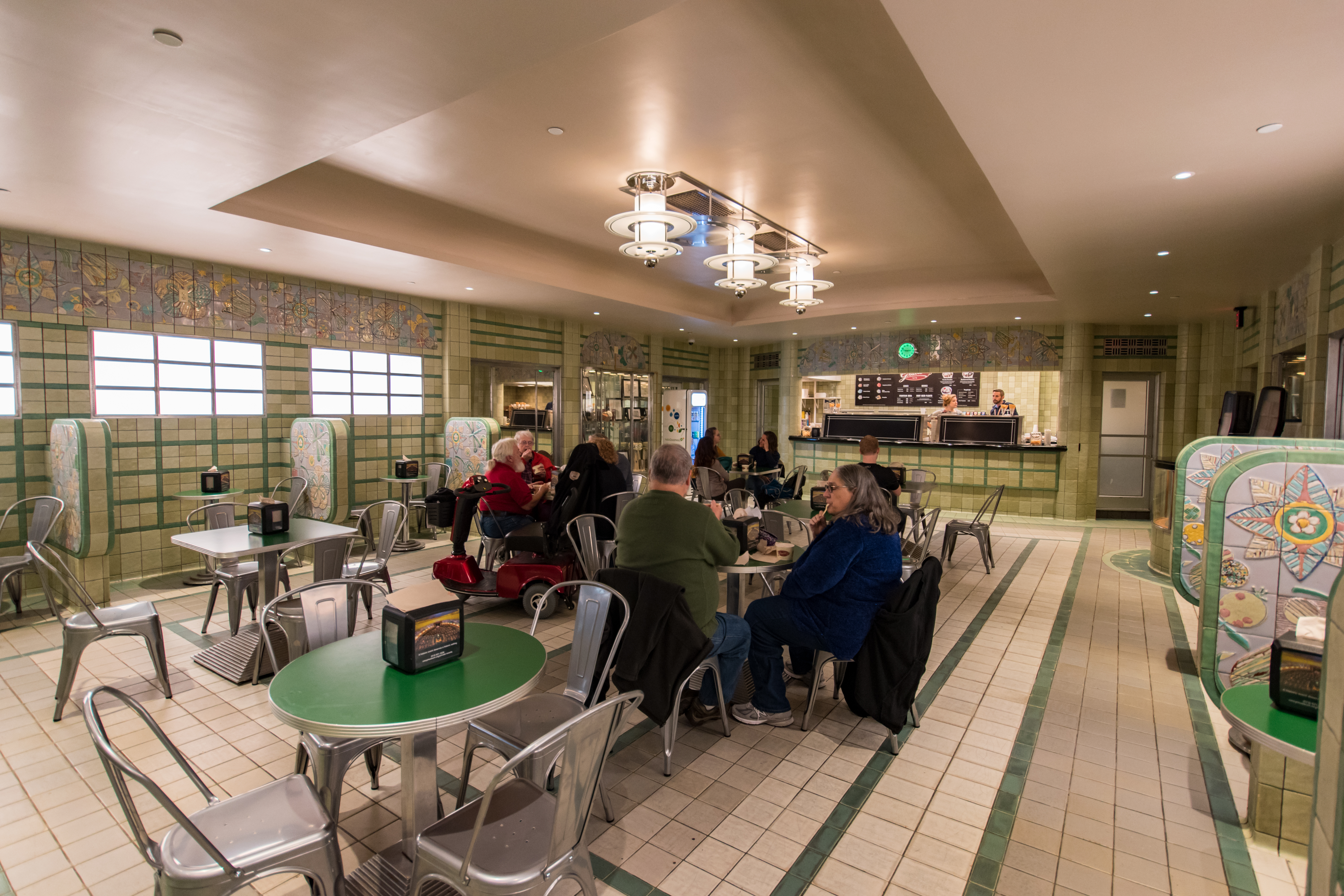
Rookwood tea room

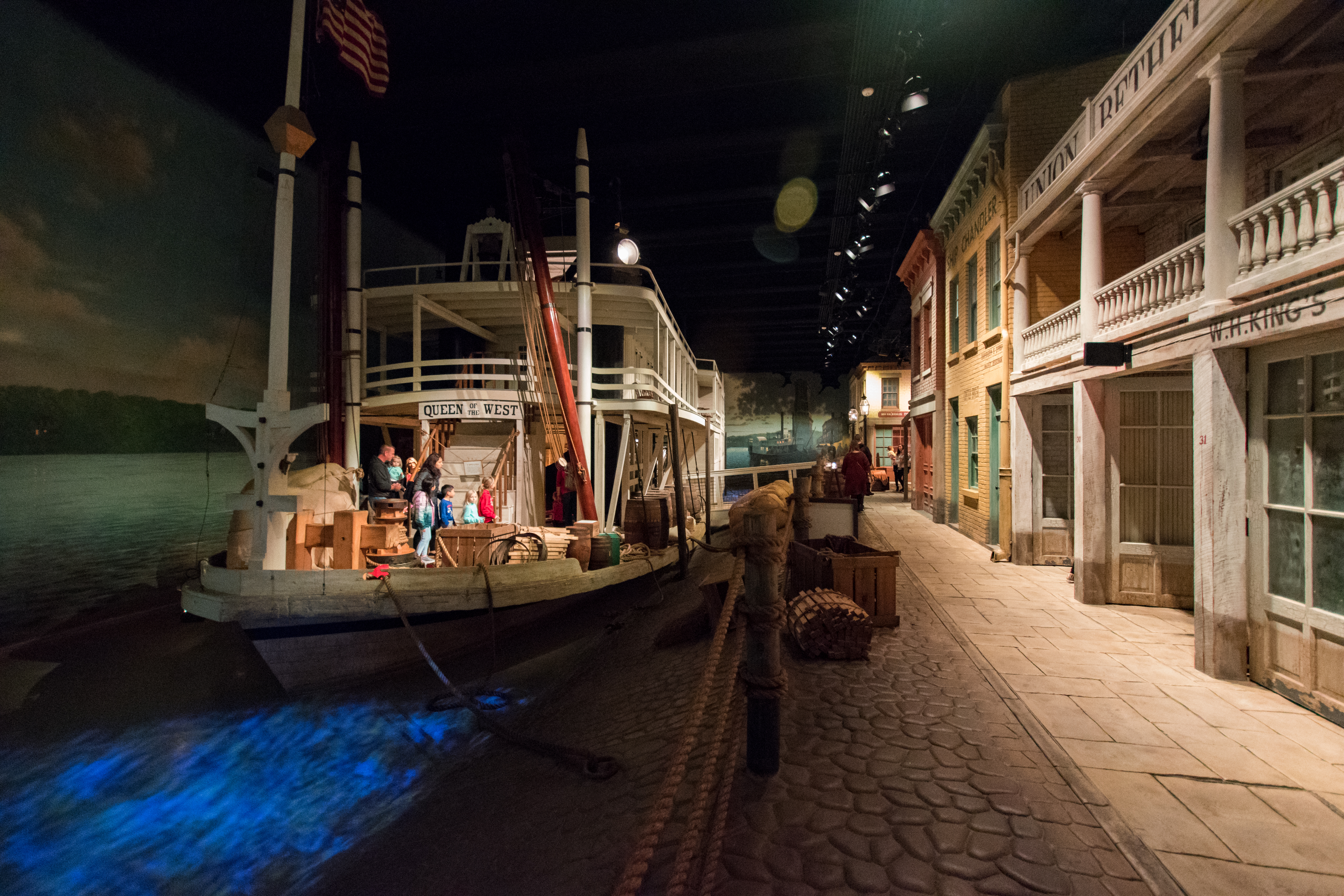
Public Landing recreation

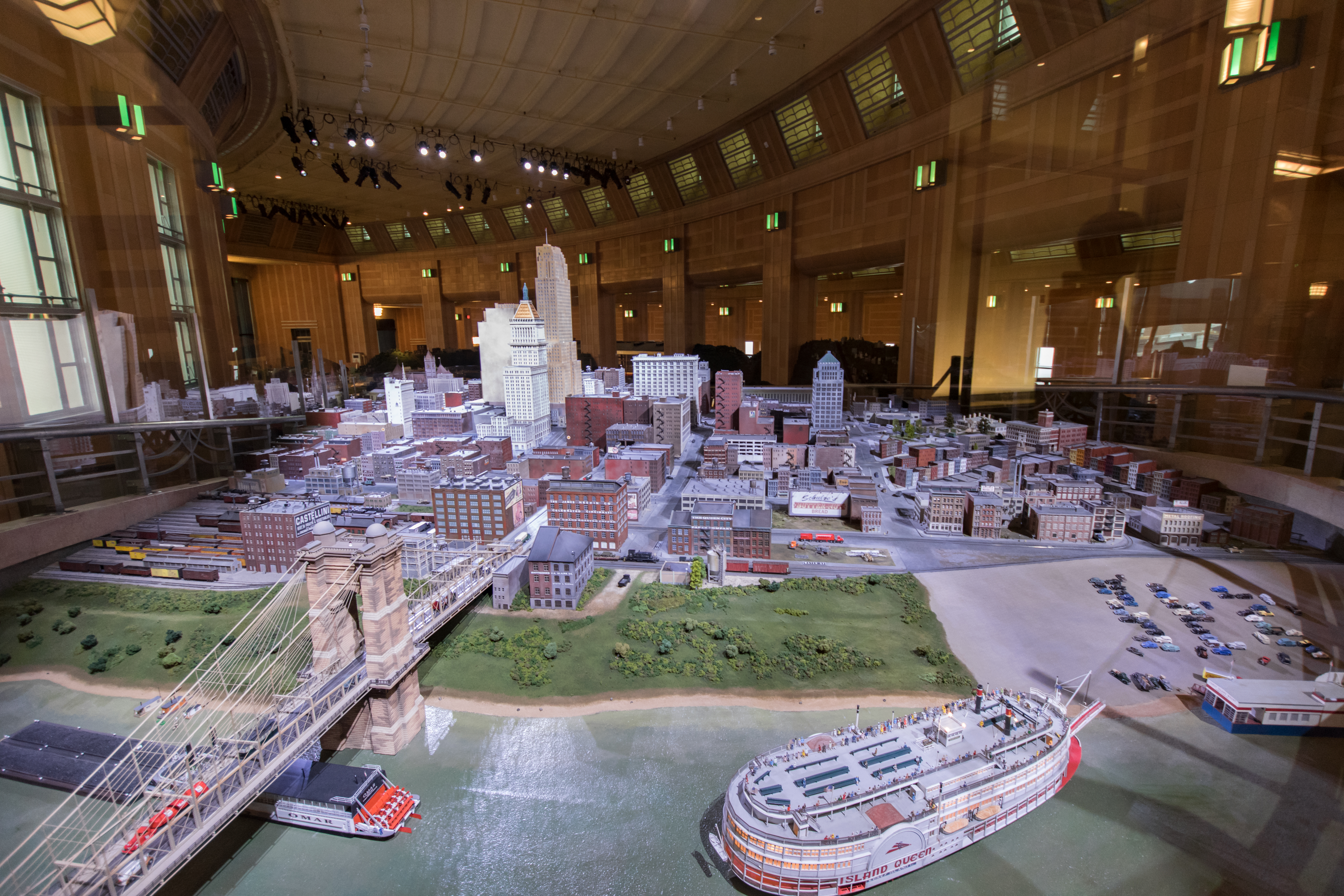
Cincinnati in Motion exhibit

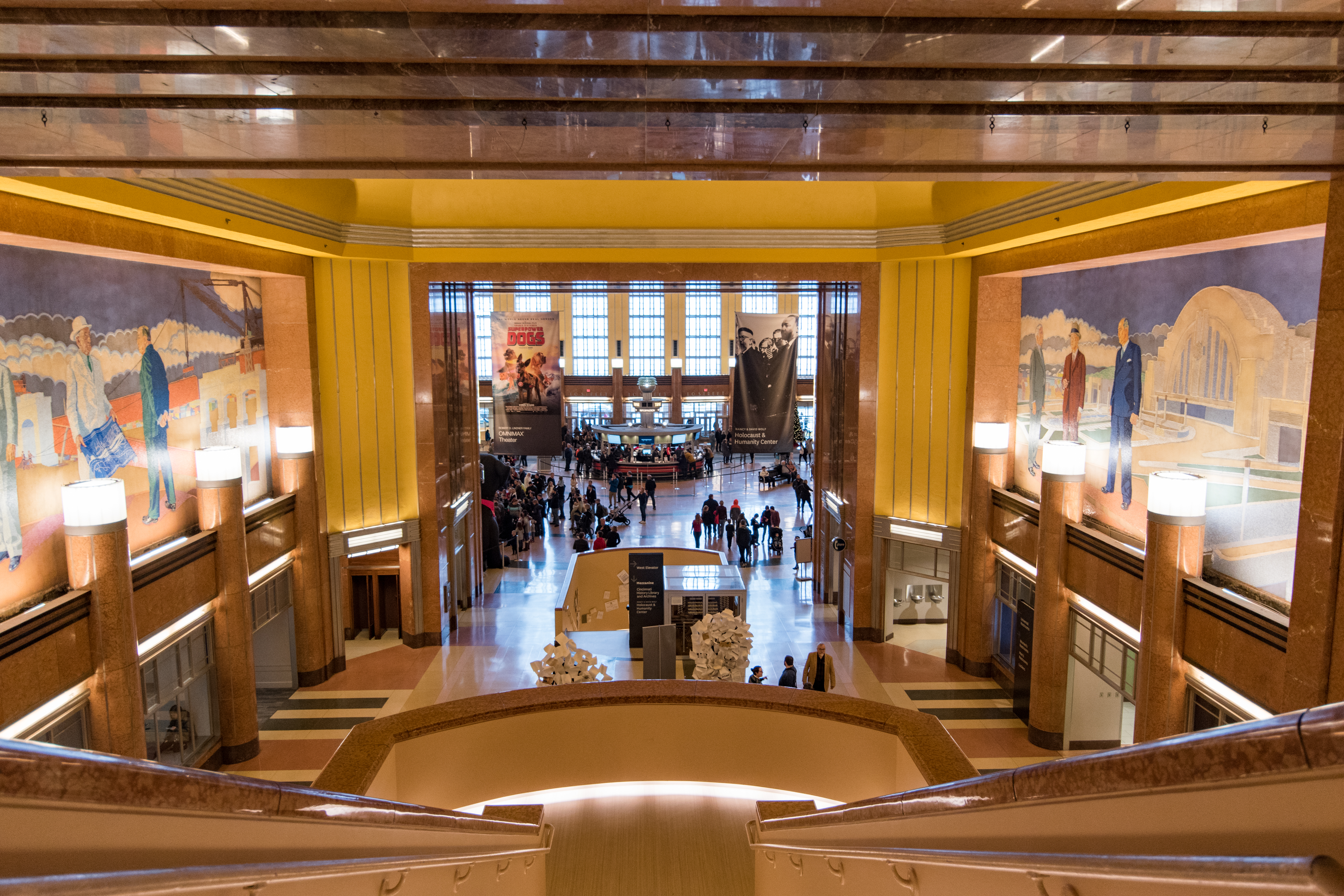
Checking Lobby

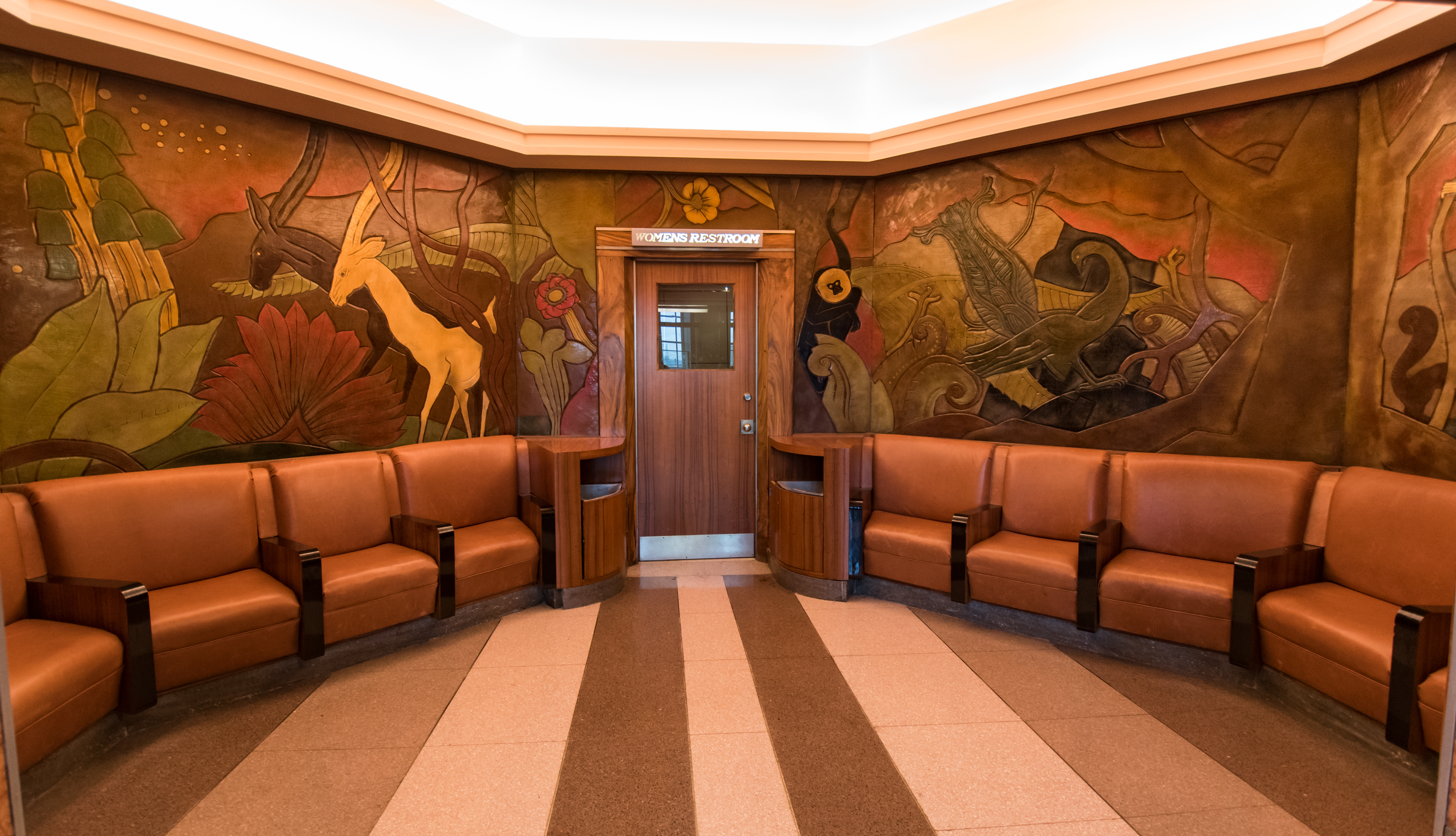
Women's Room

=== Artwork ===
Cincinnati Union Terminal features works of art throughout its interior spaces. The works of art originally included 23 mosaic murals, totaling 18,150 square feet (1,686 m^{2}), making it the largest collection of secular mosaics in the United States in 1933.

The terminal's interior features numerous works by German-American artist Winold Reiss. Reiss was commissioned to design and create two large mosaic murals depicting the history of Cincinnati and history of the United States for the rotunda, two murals for the baggage checking lobby, two murals for the departing and arriving train boards, 16 smaller murals for the train concourse representing local industries, and a large world map mural. Reiss spent roughly two years in the design and creation of the murals.

The murals are often compared to works of the Federal Art Project, sponsored by the Works Progress Administration, however the Reiss murals predate the Federal Art Project by several years.

==== Rotunda murals ====
Rotunda murals

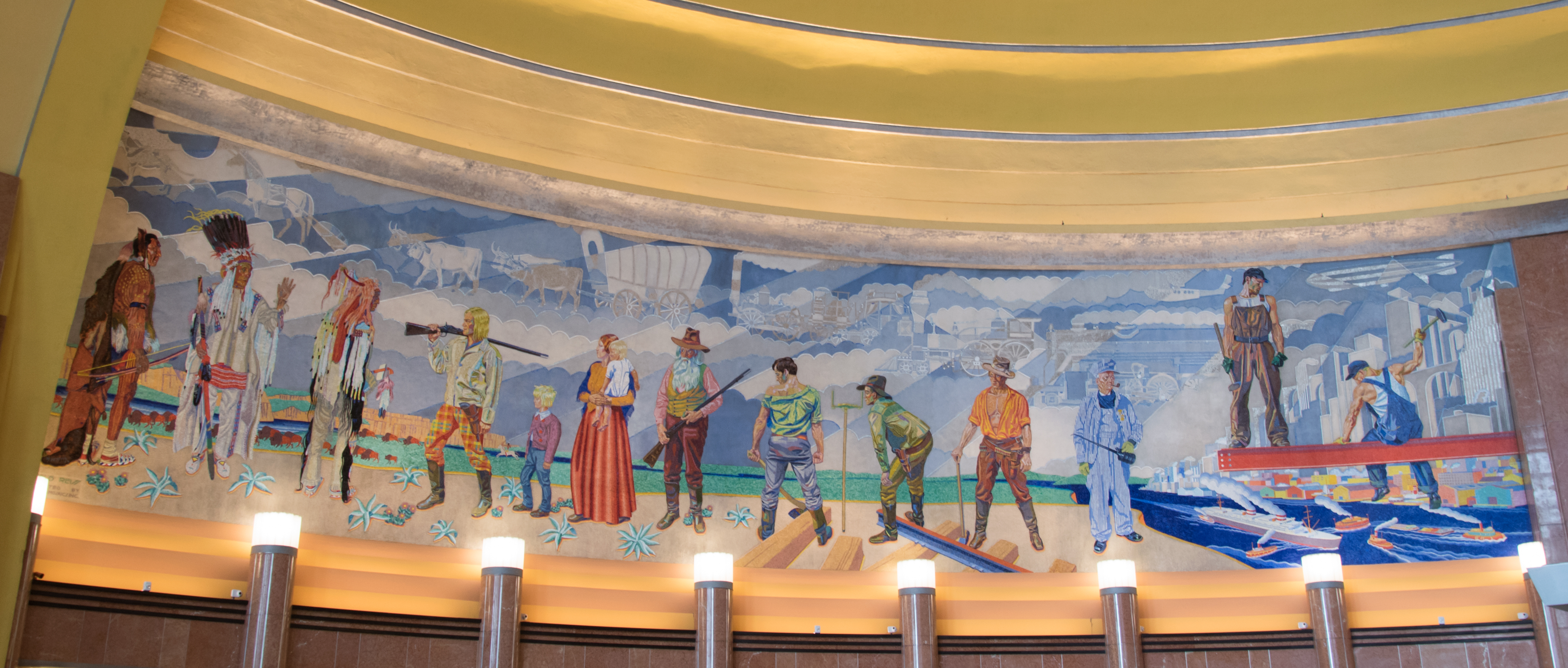
South mural, depicting US history

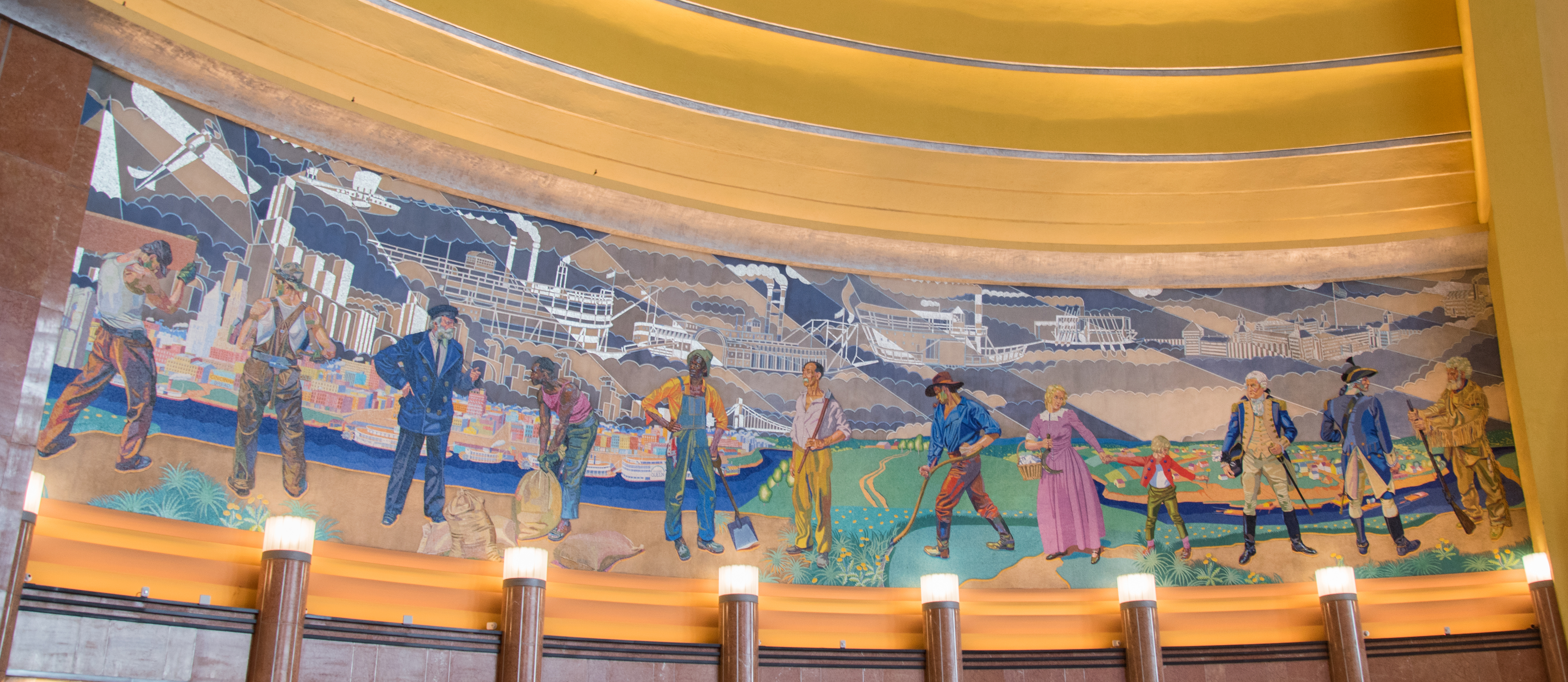
North mural, depicting Cincinnati history

The rotunda murals measure 105 by 22 feet (32.0 m × 6.7 m); when created they were among the largest works of art in the US. The south mural (on the left side of the rotunda from the entrance) depicts US history, while the north mural (on the right side of the rotunda) depicts the history of the city of Cincinnati. Reiss explained that the south mural symbolizes the country's development from Native American inhabitance to the late industrial era, with a history of transportation in the background. The mural showed Native Americans of the Blackfoot Confederacy, a group that Reiss himself joined for months in 1920 and painted for years following. The pioneer family depicted symbolizes "the courage and fortitude of the man; the loyalty and love of the mother; the wondering romance of the past and future America in the eyes of the boy".

The Cincinnati mural, on the north side of the rotunda, is set in the Ohio River Valley. The figures represent exploration, agricultural development, shipbuilding, and industry. Cincinnati's Fort Washington is shown in the background at the top right, while the evolution of Ohio River shipping and Cincinnati in the 1930s fills the rest of the background. Above the 1930s skyline is Reiss' imagination of the future city. The only prominent figure is Arthur St. Clair, who named Cincinnati, at the third from the right. The other figures are deliberately meant to be common people. Reiss used family members (including sons and a brother), local construction workers, and studio models for the mural. The African American laborers were drawn from Union Terminal construction workers, while the Blackfeet natives were copied from sketches Reiss made earlier while visiting the group. One of Reiss's studies for the mural is displayed in the mezzanine level of the Cincinnati History Museum.

==== World map mural ====
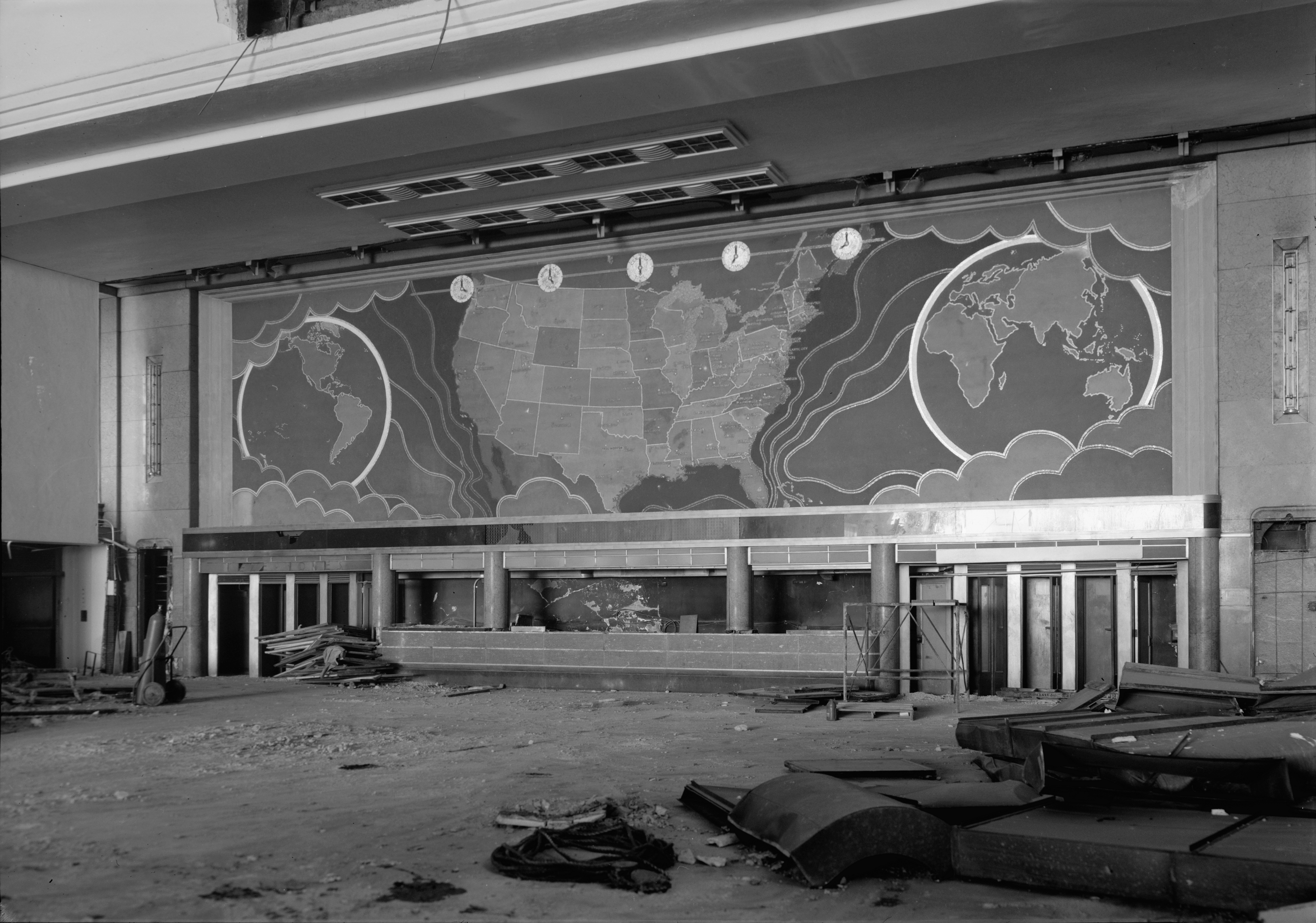
Map mural lost in the concourse's demolition

The world map mural was 70 by 16 feet (21.3 m × 4.9 m), weighing 22.4 tons. It included five decorative clocks made of tile, together representing five of the United States's time zones: Pacific, Mountain, Central, Eastern, and Atlantic. The United States was depicted in the center, divided into the time zones. Major cities were spelled out in the terminal's Art Deco typeface; Cincinnati was spelled largest. The mural also included two Nicolosi globular projections of the world, with the Americas on the left side and Europe, Africa, Asia and Australia on the right. The mural was demolished along with the train concourse in 1974; due to its size, the cost of saving it was estimated at $100,000 ($652,800 in 2025). All of the clocks remain, except the Eastern time clock.

The original Winold Reiss study for the mural survives, created in 1931-32 and measuring 5 feet 2 inches (1.57 m) by 19 feet 9 inches (6.02 m). The study is a work in progress, showing the process and decisions taken to complete the work; it was not completed as his other studies were. The painting was one of several offered as a donation from a private collector to the Herbert F. Johnson Museum of Art at Cornell University. Chief Curator Ellen Avril, a Cincinnati native, recognized the work and recommended donating it to the Cincinnati Museum Center instead. The donation to the Cincinnati Museum Center was accepted in 2013 and the mural was moved to the entrance to the Cincinnati History Museum. In 2014, Avril assisted with another donation to the terminal: seven Winold Reiss oil paintings of different people, four are figures in the south mural of the rotunda; three are figures in the south mural of the former baggage checking lobby.

==== Industrial murals ====
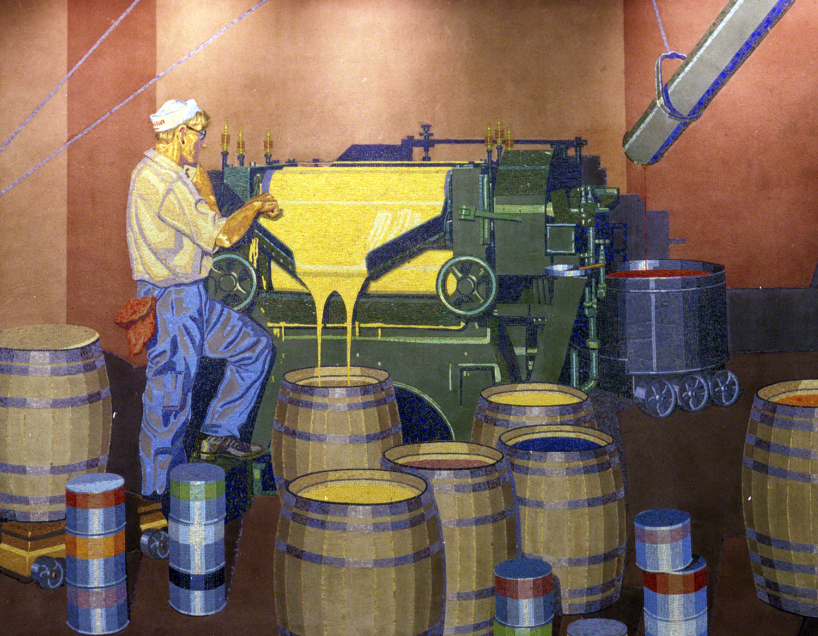
Ink-making mural at the Cincinnati/Northern Kentucky International Airport

Reiss also created a set of sixteen murals depicting Cincinnati industries, created for the train concourse. Since the concourse's demolition in 1974, fourteen of the works have been moved numerous times. Currently five of these murals are at the Cincinnati/Northern Kentucky International Airport and nine are at the Duke Energy Convention Center. Two of the murals were initially installed in a still-existing section of Union Terminal; these murals remain in the building.

==== Construction murals ====
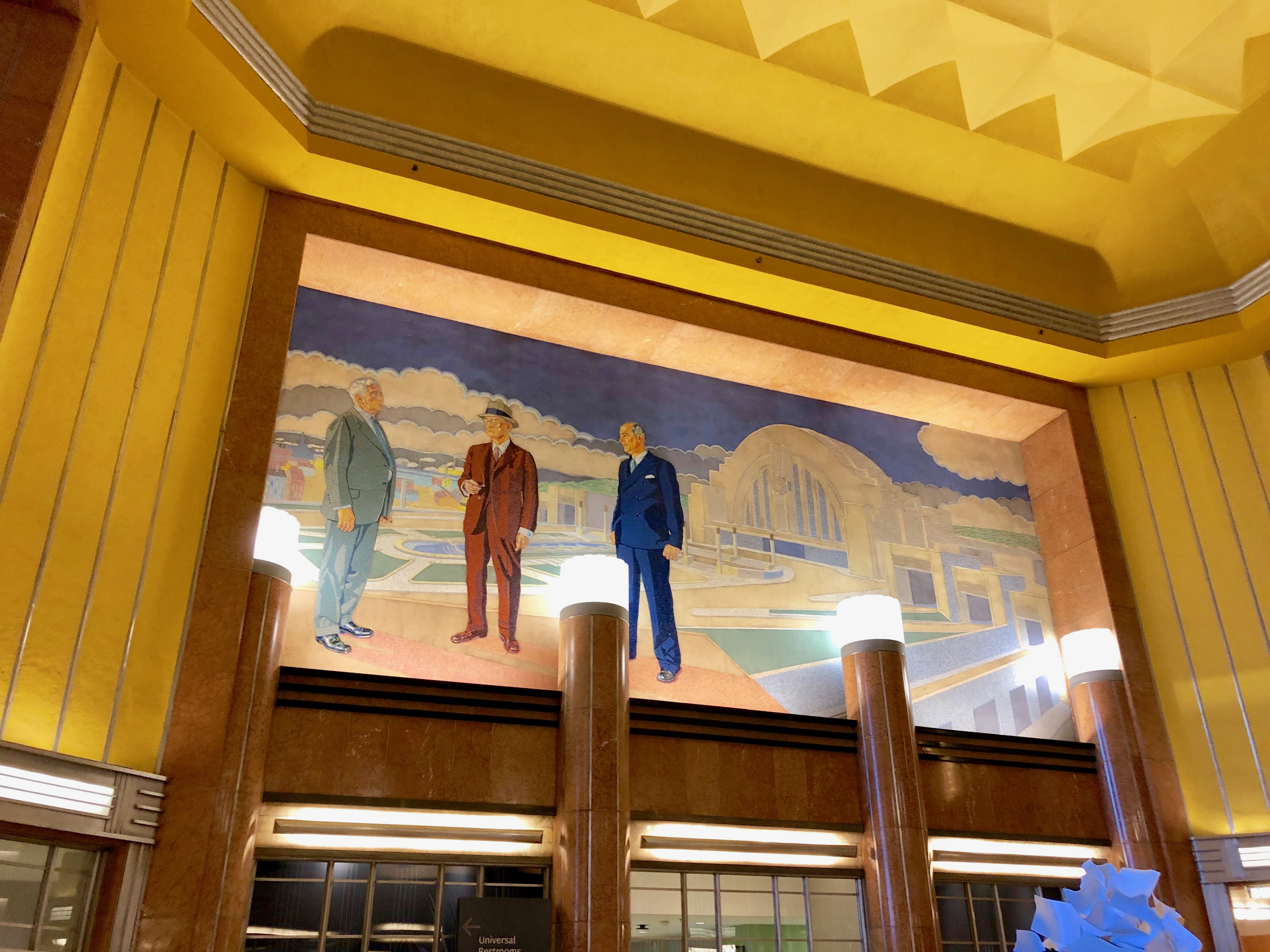
South mural, depicting the city mayor, manager, and Union Terminal president at the terminal's completion

Two Reiss murals are located in the checking lobby, by the current entrance to the Omnimax theater and historically an intermediate space between the rotunda and train concourse. The lobby was where passengers would check their baggage and parcels before traveling. The murals measure 13 by 30 feet (4.0 m × 9.1 m), and depict seven people who played a significant role in the terminal's development and construction. The south mural, left to right, features Russell Wilson (Cincinnati mayor at the project's completion in 1933), H. A. Worcester (first Union Terminal Co. president), and Clarence A. Dykstra (city manager in 1933). The north mural features, left to right, Murray Seasongood (mayor at the project's start in 1929), Clarence O. Sherrill (city manager in 1929), Henry M. Waite (chief engineer for the Union Terminal Co.), and George Dent Crabbs (founder of the Union Terminal Company).

==== Other murals ====
Reiss made two murals to decorate space above the arrivals and departures chalkboards at the head of the train concourse. After the concourse's demolition, they were moved to each side of the entrance of the Cincinnati History Library, on the mezzanine level (the space is now occupied by the Holocaust & Humanity Center). The arrivals board featured an oncoming New York Central Hudson locomotive, and the departure board featured a departing observation car typical of the time. These murals were spared from demolition. From 1989 to 1991, to make room for the Omnimax theater under construction, the train murals were relocated to the mezzanine.

Pierre Bourdelle, son of renowned French sculptor Antoine Bourdelle, was also commissioned to create artwork for the terminal. He painted 5,496 square feet (510.6 m^{2}) of works, the largest single project of his career. The works included a jungle-themed mural of linoleum panels, painted and lacquered, for the women's lounge, and works for the men's lounge, baggage checking area, meeting spaces, and the executive offices. He also painted 22 murals for the lunchroom, the current Losantiville Dining Room. The murals depict live animals, fruits, vegetables, bread, and other food. They were removed around the 1980s due to damage from nicotine, soot, and dirt, and were restored and re-hung in 2018 during the terminal's renovation. The murals once again decorate the room's frieze. The ceiling mural in the room's vestibule was also cleaned, and a small patch was left uncleaned to show the extent of the restoration.

=== Innovations, reception, and legacy ===
The terminal is widely considered the United States' finest example of railway architecture, and one of the last grand train stations in the country. The terminal was designed with a large amount of interior and exterior art, unusual for train stations at the time, intended to set Union Terminal apart and make it a model of modern Cincinnati. The commission was one of the largest of the time period. As well, the dome was the largest unsupported half-dome at the time of opening.

The terminal is popularly recognized by the American public; it was the 45th most popular work of architecture in the United States in the American Institute of Architects' 2006-2007 survey America's Favorite Architecture. It was also recognized in the survey as the most popular work of architecture in the state of Ohio.

== In popular culture ==
Union Terminal inspired the design of the Hall of Justice, a fictional Justice League headquarters appearing in comic books, television, and other media published by DC Comics. The Hall of Justice first appeared in the 1970s animated series Super Friends. The show was produced by Hanna-Barbera, a division of Cincinnati-based Taft Broadcasting. One of the animators, Al Gmuer, likely visited the terminal while attending meetings, and confirmed he was inspired by the terminal in designing the superhero headquarters.

The exterior and interior of Union Terminal appear in the 2025 film Superman as the headquarters of the "Justice Gang". In the interior scenes, the Winold Reiss murals depicting the history of Cincinnati and America were replaced with similar murals featuring the history of metahumans in the DC Universe.

Union Terminal was also featured in the 1996 DC comic book series Terminal City.

In 2023, the station was featured on a USPS Forever stamp in a five-stamp "Railroad Stations" series. The stamp illustrations were made by Down the Street Designs, and Derry Noyes served as the art director.

== History ==
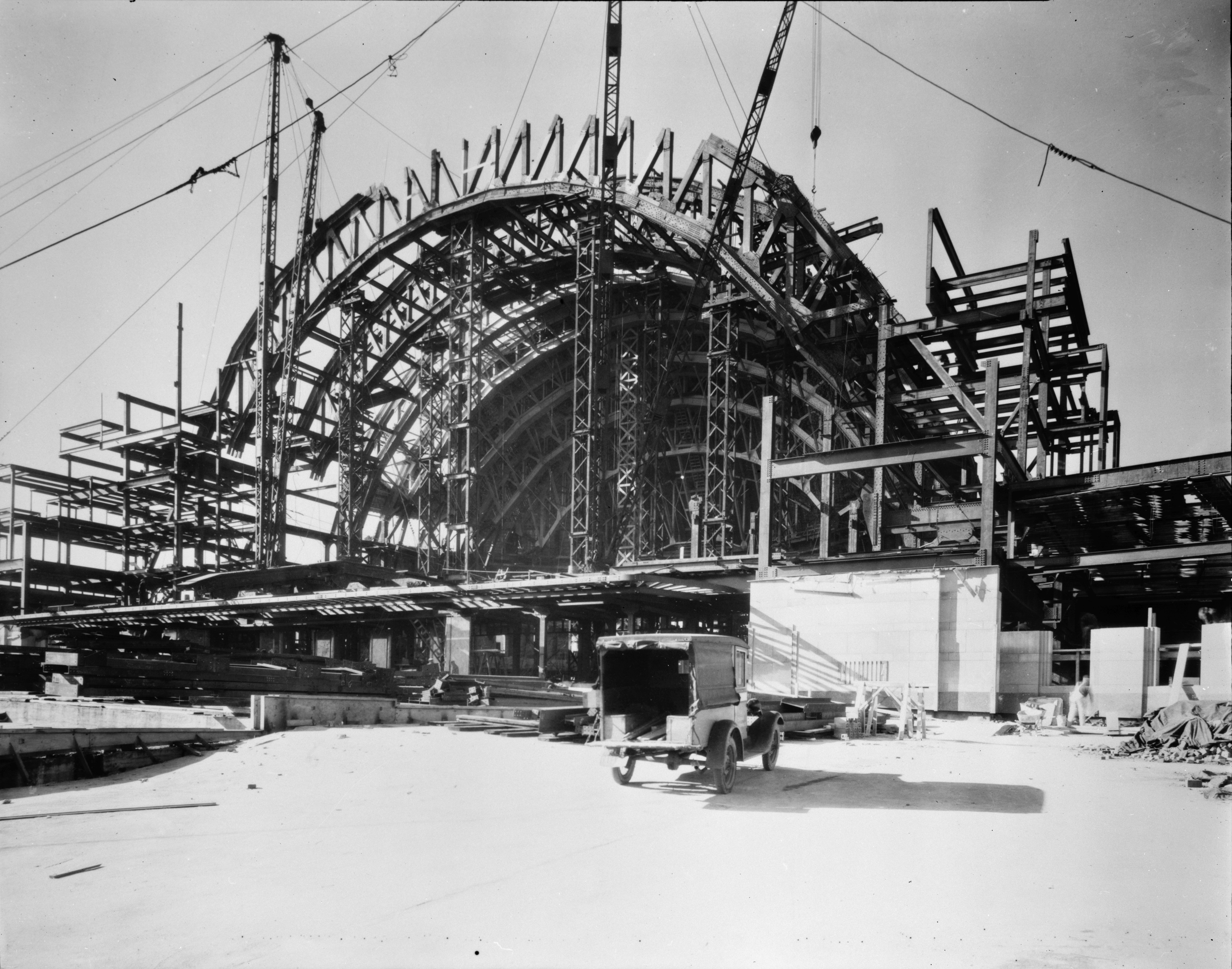
Structural framing of the terminal's dome

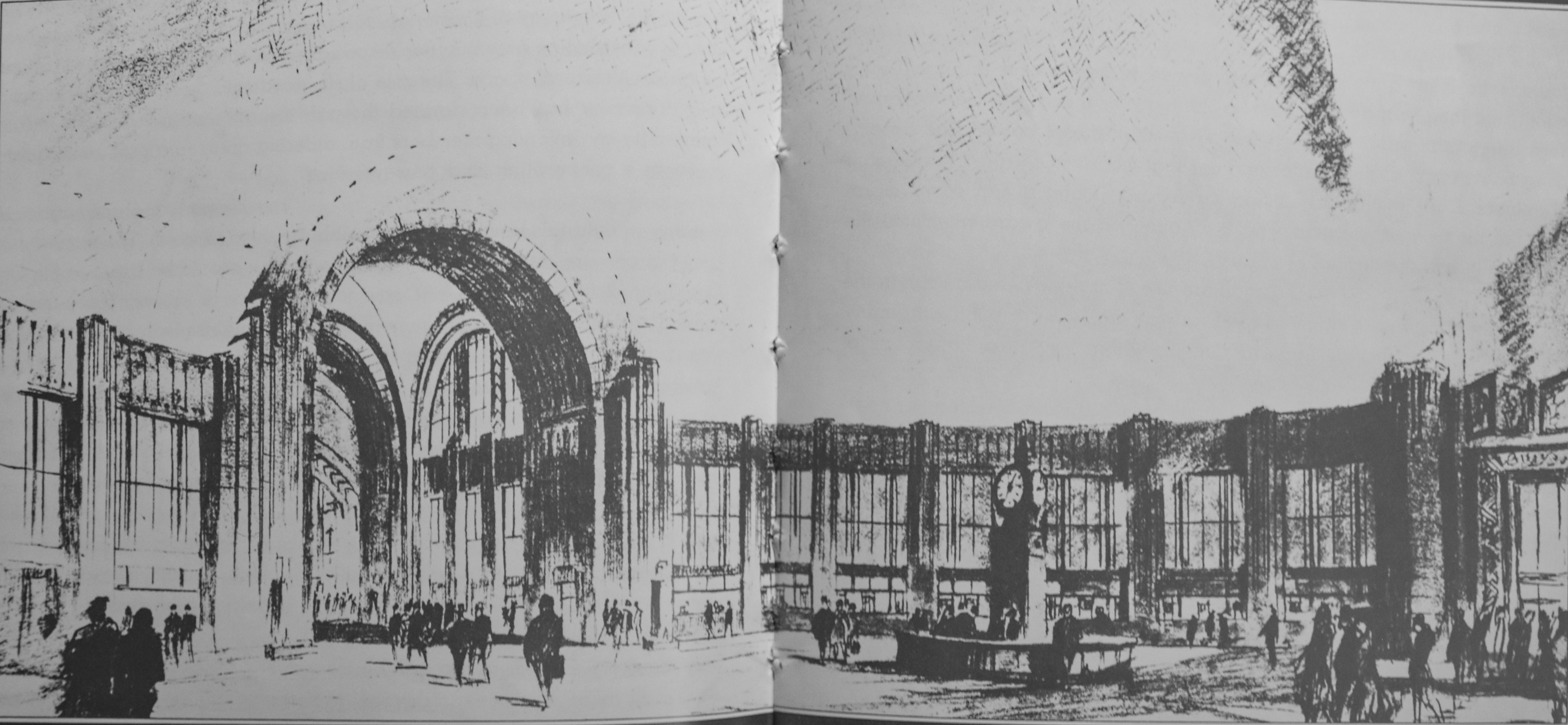
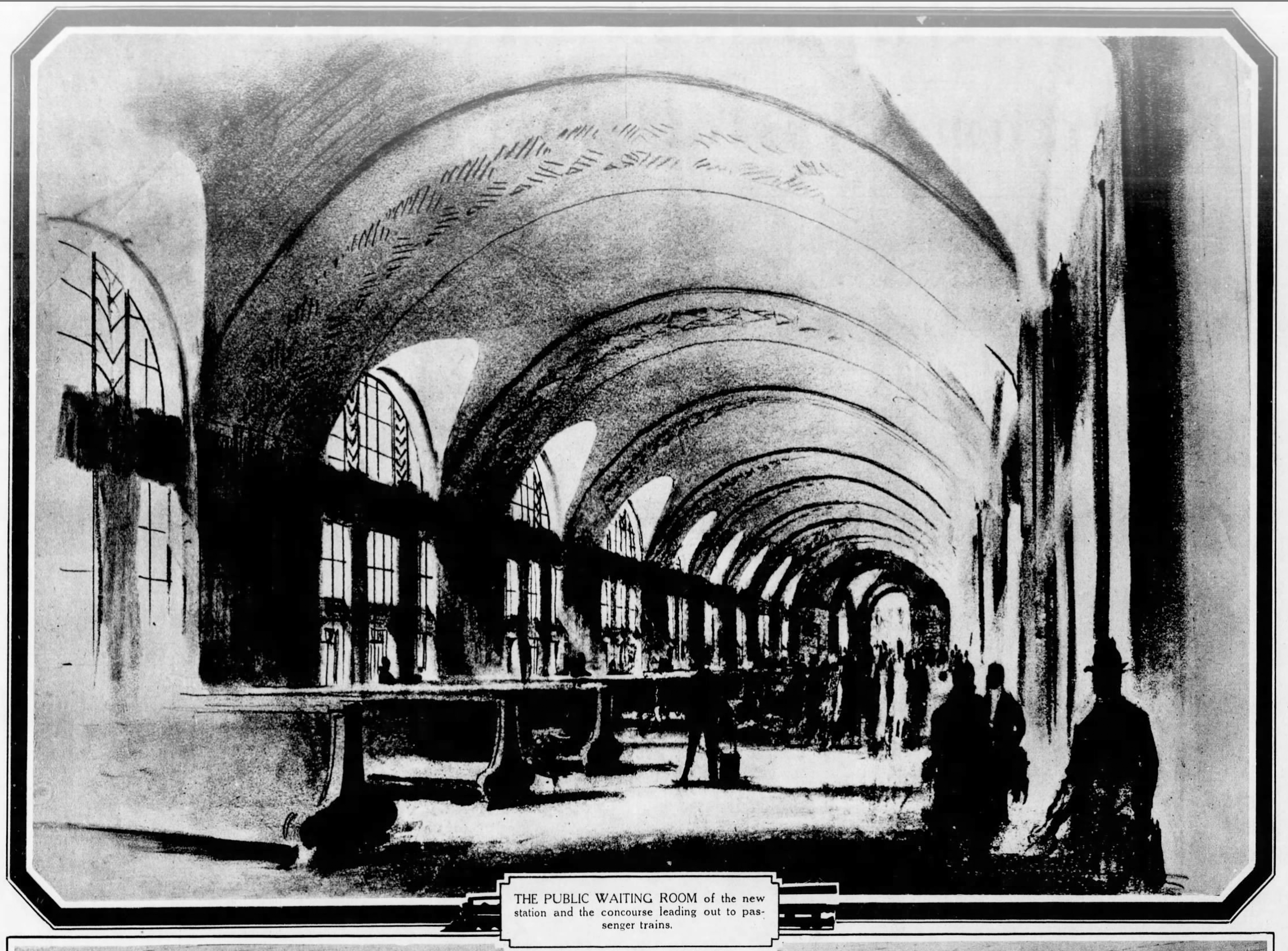
June 1929 sketches: rotunda and concourse

=== Background, planning, and construction ===
Cincinnati was a major center of railroad traffic in the late 19th and early 20th century. However, Cincinnati's intercity passenger traffic was split among five stations which were cramped and prone to flooding from the Ohio River. After the Great Flood of 1884, railroad presidents began seeking one major terminal located far from the river. Alderman Robert J. O'Brien was also an advocate for a unified railway station for the city. During the midst of planning, World War I and the Depression of 1920–21 interrupted efforts to create the union station. An agreement for a union station among the seven railroads that served Cincinnati and the city itself was not achieved until July 1927. The seven railroads – the Baltimore and Ohio Railroad; Chesapeake and Ohio Railway; New York Central Railroad (through its subsidiary, the Cleveland, Cincinnati, Chicago and St. Louis Railway, or "the Big Four"); Louisville and Nashville Railroad; Norfolk and Western Railway; Pennsylvania Railroad; and the Southern Railway – selected a site for their new station in the West End, near the Mill Creek.

The architectural firm Fellheimer & Wagner was commissioned to design the terminal in June 1928. The firm first released conservative plans with Gothic attributes in June 1929. The design evolved toward its final Art Deco design between 1931 and 1932. Art Deco was chosen with its proposed cost savings in mind, as well as its liveliness, color, and modern decoration.

The Union Terminal Company was created on July 14, 1927, to build the terminal complex and other related transportation improvements. Construction began in 1928 with the regrading of the Mill Creek valley to a point nearly level with the surrounding city, an effort that required 5.5 million cubic yards (4.2 million cubic meters) of landfill. Other work included the construction of mail and express terminals, an engine terminal, power house, coach yard, viaducts over the Mill Creek, and the railroad approaches to Union Terminal. Construction on the terminal building itself began in August 1929, shortly before the Great Depression. Construction was finished six months ahead of schedule; its final cost was $41.5 million. The terminal was put into emergency operation on March 19, 1933, because another Ohio River flood forced the closure of four train stations in the city. The official opening of the station was on March 31, 1933. At this event, B&O director John J. Cornwell notably stated that passenger stations were declining in use, and that the building's completion came after its need had passed.

=== Operation and decline ===
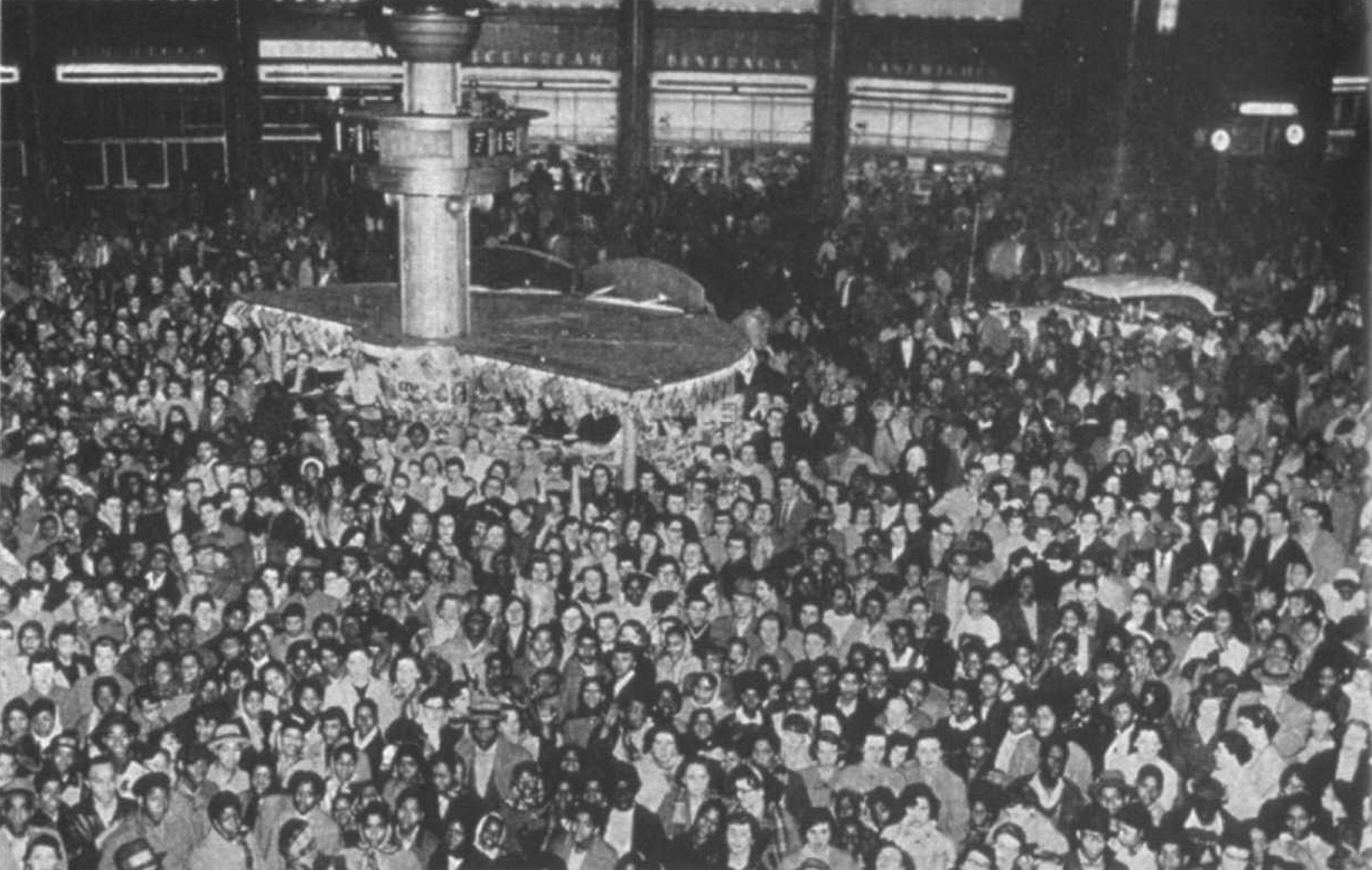
Christmastime crowd, 1945

Union Terminal opened during the Great Depression, a time of decline in train travel. Its early years therefore experienced relatively low passenger traffic. By 1939, local newspapers were already describing the station as a white elephant. While it had a brief revival in the 1940s, because of World War II, it declined in use through the 1950s into the 1960s, as passengers had taken to affordable individual automobiles and airplanes for long-distance travel. In the late 1950s the Union Terminal Company began searching for other uses for the building. Train service decreased from 51 per day in 1953 to 24 per day in 1962. In June 1963, eight proposals for the space were made public: a railroad museum; transportation center for air, bus and rail lines; court building; convention center; Air Force museum; museum of science and industry; private industry; and a shopping center. In 1968, the Cincinnati Science Center opened in Union Terminal, though due to financial difficulties, the museum closed in 1970.

=== Abandonment and partial demolition ===
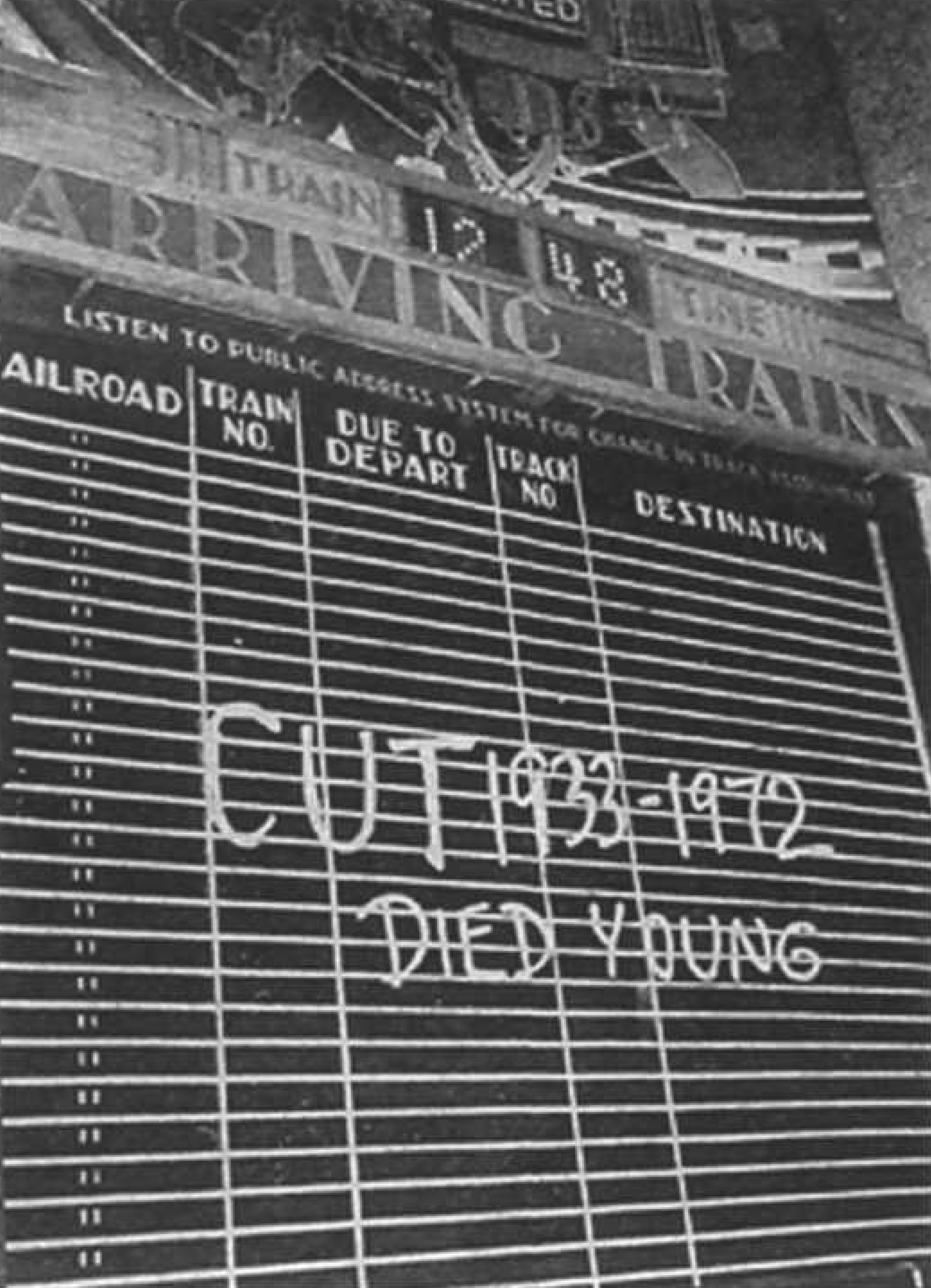
Arrivals chalkboard on October 28, 1972

Amtrak took over most passenger service in the United States in 1971, and cut back Cincinnati's service to just two routes a day, subsequently reduced to just one. As this did not even begin to justify the use of such a large facility, Amtrak also scheduled the terminal to close in October 1972, after 18 months of Amtrak service. The terminal would this be the first major station it abandoned in favor of a new station. The scheduled closure left the terminal's fate uncertain, leading multiple efforts to bring the topic to public attention in mid-to-late October 1972. On October 11, 1972, the Ohio Historical Society nominated the terminal for the National Register of Historic Places, with a note of emergency as Southern Railway planned to demolish the terminal; the nomination was approved 20 days later. The last passenger train departed on October 28, 1972, and Amtrak abandoned the terminal and opened a smaller station nearby on the following day. The Union Terminal Company was left with an empty building, no income, and significant debt. It sold the building and rail yard to Southern Railway, which was expanding its freight operations. The railroad turned the passenger yard into a freight yard, and planned on removing the terminal's train concourse to allow additional height for its piggyback operations. The Southern Railway announced the demolition plans and allowed interested parties time to remove the concourse's murals.

In January 1973, the Revive Union Terminal Committee picketed a Southern Railway board member's house, the city commissioner refused to issue a wrecking permit for the terminal, and further public events were planned. On May 15, 1973, the Cincinnati City Council's Urban Development and Planning Committee voted 3–1 to designate Union Terminal for preservation as a Cincinnati Local Historic Landmark, preventing Southern Railway from destroying the entire building. In 1974, the Southern Railway tore down most of the train concourse. Before this, the city removed fourteen Reiss industrial murals; they were transported and installed at the Cincinnati/Northern Kentucky International Airport. A grassroots campaign named "Save the Terminal" raised the $400,000 needed to save the works, though it could not raise sufficient funds to save the map mural at the west wall of the concourse, which was destroyed. Several plans were floated for reuse of the building in the 1970s, including as a local transit hub or arts school. In August 1975, the City of Cincinnati purchased the terminal and searched for tenants. Three developers proposed plans, and the city chose the Joseph Skilken Organization, a Columbus, Ohio-based real estate developer.

The Skilken Organization initially proposed "Oz" or the "Land of Oz", a shopping mall with an ice skating rink and bowling alley. The ice skating and bowling never materialized, but the shopping center's retail and restaurants began installation in 1978. Skilken invested about $20 million in renovating the terminal. In 1977, the terminal was designated a U.S. National Historic Landmark. On August 4, 1980, the mall had its opening celebration, with 40 tenants. At its peak, the mall had 7,800 to 8,000 visitors per day and had 54 vendors. The recession of the early 1980s hurt the mall; interest rates quickly grew from 6 to 22 percent. In 1981, the first tenant moved out; by 1982, the number of tenants had fallen to 21. In August 1982, the Cincinnati Museum of Health, Science and Industry opened in the terminal. Oz closed in 1984, but its anchor — Loehmann's Department Store in the center of the Rotunda — remained open until the following year.

=== Museum operation and rail service ===
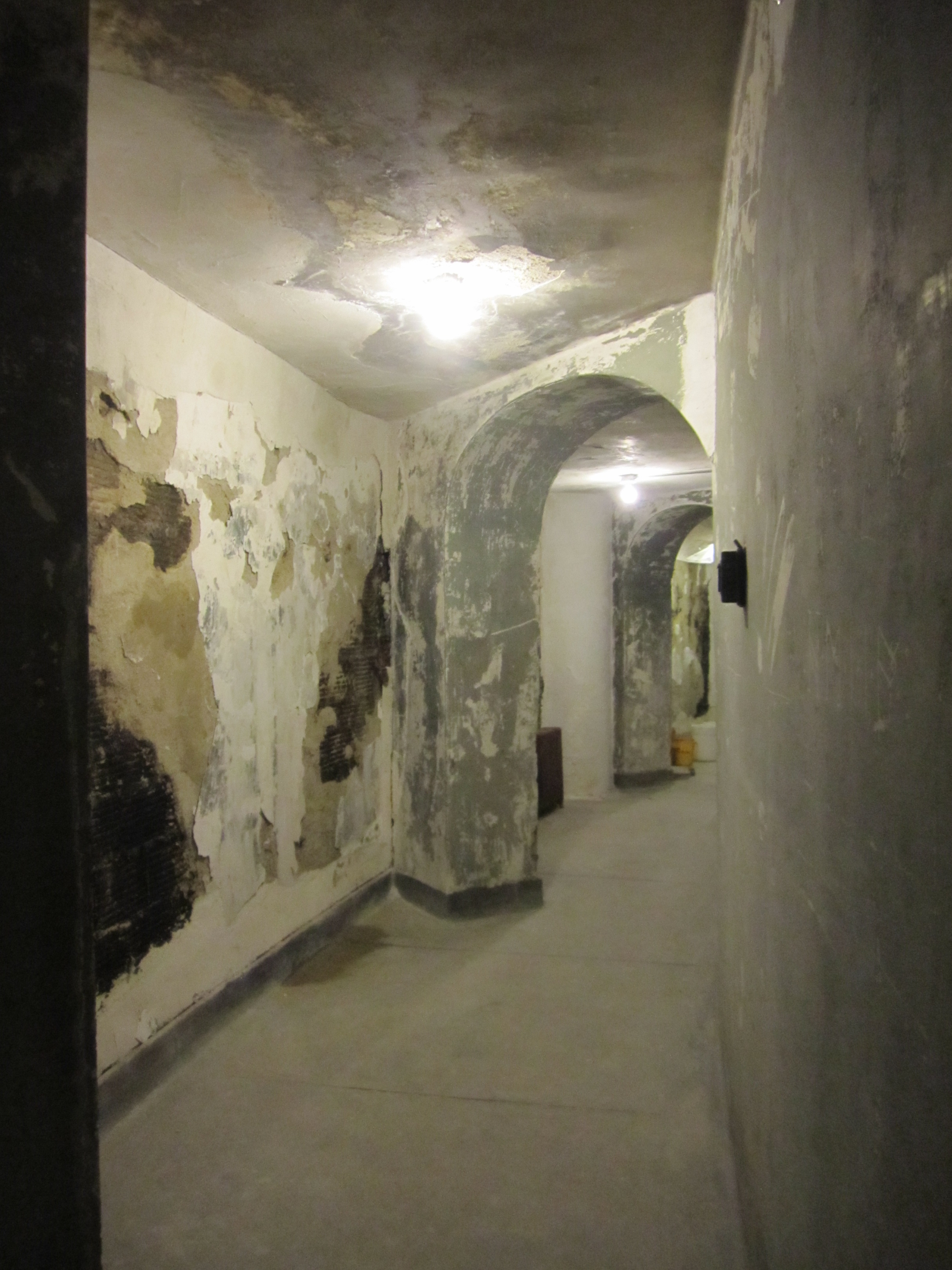
Deteriorating service hallways before the 2016–18 renovation

In the early 1980s, the Cincinnati Historical Society and Cincinnati Museum of Natural History began to search for larger spaces. They eventually decided to join in occupying space in Union Terminal. To fund the necessary renovations, Hamilton County voters approved a $33 million bond levy in May 1986. Other funding came from the state of Ohio ($8 million) the city of Cincinnati ($3 million), and more than 3,000 Cincinnati individuals, corporations and foundations. The renovation turned some 200,000 square feet (19,000 m^{2}) of underground space, as well as the terminal's taxi and bus ramps, into exhibition space. The main concourse was restored, retail space was refurbished, and the theater was restored. The entrance to the train concourse was renovated into the Omnimax theater, and the men's lounge became Amtrak's waiting room and ticket counter.

The museum opened on November 10, 1990. The original members of the museum center were the Cincinnati Historical Society Library, Cincinnati History Museum, Cincinnati Museum of Natural History, and the Robert D. Lindner Family Omnimax Theater. The center became the fourth-largest attraction in the area, behind the Cincinnati Reds, Kings Island, and the Cincinnati Zoo. The museum center renovations also allowed Amtrak to restore service to Union Terminal via the tri-weekly Cardinal train in 1991. In 1995, the entities officially merged to create the Cincinnati Museum Center, also joined by the Cinergy Children's Museum in October 1998.

In 2004, county residents approved a levy for the building's operating costs and capital repairs. In 2009, they extended the levy to fund further repairs, and the museum center began to restore the terminal's southwest wing of the terminal.

In July 2016, the museum shut down for the first renovation of the entire building, a $228 million effort that would last until November 2018. In July 2018, Amtrak stopped staffing 15 of its stations, including Cincinnati. Since the completion of the renovation project, Amtrak allows customers to check bags trainside. The building and museum center had their reopening ceremony on November 17, 2018.

In January 2019, the terminal gained another museum as a tenant, the Nancy & David Wolf Holocaust and Humanity Center, in the former space of the History Library.
