= List of named passenger trains of the United States (C) =

This article contains a list of named passenger trains in the United States with names beginning with C.

== List ==
Train Name	Railroad	Train Endpoints in a typical [year]	Operated
Cabana	New Haven	New York, New York - Boston, Massachusetts [1951]	1932–1940; 1950–1954; 1962
California and Mexico Express	Santa Fe	Kansas City, Missouri - Los Angeles, California [1904]	1886-1907
California Express	Texas and Pacific	Texarkana, Texas - El Paso, Texas (with through sleepers to Los Angeles, St. Louis and other points) [1913]	1893-1899; 1911–1918
California Express	Southern Pacific	San Francisco, California - Portland, Oregon [1922]	1921-1924
California Express	Santa Fe	Chicago, Illinois - Los Angeles, California - San Francisco, California [1905]	1886-1915
California Express	Union Pacific	Salt Lake City, Utah - Los Angeles, California [1926]	1923-1930
California Fast Mail	Santa Fe	Chicago, Illinois - Los Angeles, California - San Francisco, California [1905]	1904-1916
California Limited	Santa Fe	Chicago, Illinois - Los Angeles, California [1927]	1892–1954
California Mail	Chicago and North Western Railway, Union Pacific Railroad, Southern Pacific	Chicago, Illinois - San Francisco, California [1917]	1913-1928
California Mail	Chicago, Milwaukee, St. Paul and Pacific Railroad, Southern Pacific	Chicago, Illinois - Los Angeles, California [1915]	1914-1918
California Special	Santa Fe	Temple, Texas - Clovis, New Mexico (with through trains to Los Angeles and New Orleans) [1937]	1915-1918; 1928–1967
California Zephyr	Amtrak	Chicago, Illinois - San Francisco, California [2013]	1983–present
California Zephyr	Chicago, Burlington & Quincy; Denver and Rio Grande Western Railroad; Western Pacific	Chicago, Illinois - Oakland, California [1952]	1949–1970
Californian	Rock Island; Southern Pacific	Chicago, Illinois - Los Angeles, California [1937]	1910-1930; 1937–1946
Calumet	Amtrak	Chicago, Illinois - Valparaiso, Indiana [1981]	1980-1989
Camellia	Pennsylvania; Richmond, Fredericksburg & Potomac; Seaboard Air Line	New York, New York - Venice, Florida - Miami, Florida [1952]	1947-1952 (possibly earlier and later)
Campus	Illinois Central Railroad	Chicago, Illinois - Carbondale, Illinois [1967]	1967-1968
Campus	Amtrak	Chicago, Illinois - Champaign, Illinois [1971]	1971–1972
Canadian	Great Northern	Seattle, Washington - Vancouver, British Columbia [1930]	1919-1946
Canadian	Canadian Pacific, Via Rail (from 1977)	Toronto, Ontario - Vancouver, British Columbia [1955]	1955-1997; 2017
Canadian	Michigan Central, later, New York Central, Canadian Pacific Railway	Chicago, Illinois - Montreal, Quebec [1921], from 1934: to Toronto, Ontario	1914-1942, 1961
Canadian-Niagara	New York Central, Canadian Pacific Railway	Chicago, Illinois - Toronto, Ontario [1952]	1946-1961
Cannon Ball	Texas and Pacific Railway, Wabash Railroad,	Chicago, Illinois - El Paso, Texas [1915]	1898-1918
Cannon Ball	Boston & Maine	Boston, Massachusetts - Plymouth, New Hampshire [1941]	1938-1952
Cannon Ball	Pennsylvania Railroad, Richmond, Fredericksburg and Potomac Railroad, Atlantic Coast Line Railroad, Norfolk and Western Railway	New York, New York - Norfolk, Virginia [1948]	1947-1964
Cannonball	Long Island	New York, New York - Montauk, New York [1952]	1899–present
Cape Ann	Boston & Maine	Boston, Massachusetts - Rockport, Maine [1952]	1948-1958
Cape Codder (later named, Day Cape Codder)	New York, New Haven, & Hartford	New York, New York - Woods Hole, Massachusetts [1928]	1925-1936
Cape Codder	Amtrak	New York, New York - Hyannis, Massachusetts [1990]	1987-1996
CapeFLYER	Cape Cod Regional Transit Authority using Massachusetts Bay Transportation Authority equipment	Boston, Massachusetts - Hyannis, Massachusetts	2013–present
Capital City	Amtrak	Philadelphia, Pennsylvania - Washington, DC [1993]	1993-1994
Capital City Express	Alton Railroad	Chicago, Illinois - Springfield, Illinois [1921]	1921-1924
Capital City Express	Cleveland, Cincinnati, Chicago and St. Louis Railway	Detroit, Michigan - Cleveland, Ohio [1925]	1925-1928
Capital City Express	Amtrak	New York, New York - Albany, New York [1988]	1985-1990
Capital City Special	New York Central	Cleveland, Ohio - Columbus, Ohio (with through trains to Norfolk, VA) [1930]	1929-1958
Capital Express	Pennsylvania	Pittsburgh, Pennsylvania - St. Louis, Missouri [1906]	1904-1927
Capitol	Amtrak	New York, New York - Washington, DC [1982]	1981-1982; 1988
Capitol (group of trains)	Amtrak	Oakland, California - Roseville, California [1992]	1992-2000
Capitol 400	Chicago and North Western Railway	Chicago, Illinois - Madison, Wisconsin [1948]	1942–1950
Capitol City Special	Cleveland, Cincinnati, Chicago and St. Louis Railway	Cincinnati, Ohio - Columbus, Ohio [1920]	1916-1924
Capitol Corridor (group of trains)	Amtrak	Auburn, California - San Jose, California	1992–present
Capitol Express	Pennsylvania	Pittsburgh, Pennsylvania - Indianapolis, Indiana [1928]	1925-1929
Capitol Hill Express	Pennsylvania	New York, New York - Washington, DC [1994] (called the 'Capitol Express' from 1995)	1992-1998
Capitol Limited	Baltimore & Ohio; Central Railroad of New Jersey; Reading	Jersey City, New Jersey - Chicago, Illinois via Washington, DC [1930]	1923–1971
Capitol Limited	Illinois Terminal Railroad	St. Louis, Missouri - Peoria, Illinois [1926]	1925-1948
Capitol Limited	Amtrak	Chicago, Illinois - Washington, DC	1981–2024
Capitol Sunrise	Amtrak	New York, New York - Washington, DC [1997]	1997-1998
Capitol-Detroit	Baltimore & Ohio	Baltimore, Maryland - Detroit, Michigan [1965]	1964-1968
Cardinal	Chicago and Eastern Illinois Railroad	Chicago, Illinois - St. Louis, Missouri [1947]	1947-1949
Cardinal	Amtrak	New York, New York - Chicago, Illinois [1981]	1977–1981; 1982–present
Carl Sandburg	Amtrak	Chicago, Illinois - Quincy, Illinois [2008]	2008–present
Carolina Golfer	Pennsylvania; Richmond, Fredericksburg & Potomac; Seaboard Air Line	New York, New York - Pinehurst, North Carolina [1929]	1929-1930
Carolina Special	Southern, New York Central Railroad	Chicago, Illinois - Charleston, South Carolina [1948]	1911–1968
Carolina-Florida Special	Pennsylvania; Richmond, Fredericksburg & Potomac; Seaboard Air Line	New York, New York - Tampa, Florida - Miami, Florida [1926]	1923-1929
Carolinian	Amtrak	New York, New York - Charlotte, North Carolina [1992]	1991–present
Carpenter Express	Pennsylvania and its successor lines	Philadelphia, Pennsylvania - Chestnut Hill, Philadelphia, Pennsylvania [1965]	1962-1978
Cascade	Southern Pacific	Oakland, California - Portland, Oregon [1952]	1928-1971
Cascades (group of trains)	Amtrak	Eugene, Oregon - Vancouver, British Columbia	1999–present
Cascadia	Amtrak	Seattle, Washington - Eugene, Oregon [1996]	1996-1997
Cascadian	Great Northern	Seattle, Washington - Portland, Oregon [1930]	1929-1958
Catskill	Amtrak	New York, New York - Albany, New York [1993]	1992-1995
Cavalier	Norfolk & Western	Norfolk, Virginia - Cincinnati, Ohio [1948] (reduced to Petersburg, Virginia - Portsmouth, Ohio by October 1957)	1928-1966
Cavalier	Pennsylvania	New York, New York - Cape Charles, Virginia [1941]	1927-1956
Cavern	Santa Fe	Clovis, New Mexico - Carlsbad, New Mexico [1948]	1940-1954
Cayuga	New York Central	New York, New York - Buffalo, New York [1952]	1929-1953; 1965–1967
Cayuga	Amtrak	Albany, New York - Schenectady, New York [1984]	1984
Centennial State	Santa Fe	Denver, Colorado - Kansas City, Missouri [1948]	1940-1950
Central Express	New York Central	Buffalo, New York - Detroit, Michigan [1930]	1927-1933
Central New York Express	New York Central	New York, New York - Oswego, New York - Watertown, New York [1922]	1919-1927
Central Park	Amtrak	New York, New York - Washington, DC [1994]	1993-1995
Central States Limited	Wabash	Detroit, Michigan - Kansas City, Missouri [1930]	1929-1933
Central Texas Express	Santa Fe	Lubbock, Texas - Sweetwater, Texas [1948]	1947-1950
Century of Progress	Chicago and Eastern Illinois	Chicago, Illinois - St. Louis, Missouri [1935]	1936-1936
Challenger	Union Pacific	Chicago, Illinois - Los Angeles, California [1954]	1935–1971
Champion	Pennsylvania, then Penn Central (1968–1971); Richmond, Fredericksburg & Potomac, Atlantic Coast Line, Florida East Coast until 1963, Seaboard Coast Line Railroad, replacing ACL, 1967–1971 Amtrak from 1971	New York, New York - Miami, Florida [1942] New York, New York - St. Petersburg, Florida	1939–1979
Charter Oak	Amtrak	Boston, Massachusetts - Washington, DC [1971]	1971-1972; 1984; 1988–1990; 1995–1997
Cherokee	Rock Island; Southern Pacific	Memphis, Tennessee - Tucumcari, New Mexico - Los Angeles, California [1951]	1950-1958
Chesapeake	Amtrak	Washington, DC - Philadelphia, Pennsylvania [1993]	1973-1983; 1991–1995
Chesapeake and Ohio Express	Pennsylvania	New York, New York - Cincinnati, Ohio - Louisville, Kentucky [1895]	1895-1917; 1923–1935
Chesapeake and Ohio Limited	Pennsylvania, Chesapeake and Ohio Railway	New York, New York - Memphis, Tennessee [1906]	1906-1917
Chesapeake and Ohio Special	Cleveland, Cincinnati, Chicago and St. Louis Railway	Chicago, Illinois - Cincinnati, Ohio - St. Louis, Missouri [1906]	1906-1912
Cheshire	Boston & Maine	Boston, Massachusetts - White River Junction, Vermont [1952]	1946-1958
Chicago and Boston Special	New York Central and its affiliates	Chicago, Illinois - Boston, Massachusetts [1910]	1892-1894; 1910–1920
Chicago and Buffalo Special	New York Central	Chicago, Illinois - Buffalo, New York [1922]	1918-1931
Chicago and Evansville Express	Chicago and Eastern Illinois Railroad	Chicago, Illinois - Evansville, Indiana [1904]	1902-1906
Chicago and Florida Limited	Chicago and Eastern Illinois Railroad, Nashville, Chattanooga and St. Louis Railway, Atlantic Coast Line Railroad, Louisville and Nashville Railroad, Florida East Coast Railway	Chicago, Illinois - Jacksonville, Florida - Tampa, Florida - New Orleans, Louisiana - St. Louis, Missouri [1901]	1901-1906
Chicago and Florida Special	Queen and Crescent Route, Cleveland, Cincinnati, Chicago and St. Louis Railway	Chicago, Illinois - St. Augustine, Florida [1901]	1901-1906
Chicago and Minneapolis and St. Paul Limited	Illinois Central Railroad, Minneapolis and St. Louis Railway	Chicago, Illinois - Minneapolis, Minnesota [1905]	1903-1917
Chicago and New York Express	Delaware, Lackawanna and Western Railroad, Wabash Railroad	New York, New York - Chicago, Illinois [1930]	1900-1901; 1919–1932
Chicago and New York Special	New York Central and its affiliates	New York, New York - Chicago, Illinois [1925]	1910-1928
Chicago and San Francisco Express	Denver and Rio Grande Railroad	Denver, Colorado - Ogden, Utah (with through trains to Chicago and Los Angeles) [1914]	1911-1917
Chicago and Southwestern Special	Boston and Albany Railroad, New York Central, Cleveland, Cincinnati, Chicago and St. Louis Railway	Boston, Massachusetts - Chicago, Illinois - St. Louis, Missouri [1912]	1912-1920
Chicago and St. Louis Express	Pennsylvania	New York, New York - Chicago, Illinois - St. Louis, Missouri [1908]	1893-1912
Chicago and Toledo Special	Lake Shore and Michigan Southern Railway	Chicago, Illinois - Toledo, Ohio [1913]	1909-1917
Chicago Arrow	Pennsylvania; Wabash	Chicago, Illinois - Detroit, Michigan [1945]	1942-1948
Chicago Arrowhead	Chicago and North Western Railway	Chicago, Illinois - Minneapolis, Minnesota [1928]	1927-1930
Chicago Day Express	Chicago Great Western Railway	Chicago, Illinois - Minneapolis, Minnesota [1913]	1896-1914
Chicago Day Express	Illinois Central Railroad	Chicago, Illinois - Omaha, Nebraska [1908]	1902-1909
Chicago Daylight Express	Pennsylvania	Chicago, Illinois - Louisville, Kentucky - Cincinnati, Ohio [1952]	1906-1952
Chicago Express	Canadian Pacific; New York Central	Chicago, Illinois - Montreal, Quebec [1938]	1903-1910; 1931–1960
Chicago Express	Chicago and Eastern Illinois Railroad	Chicago, Illinois - Evansville, Indiana [1912]	1902-1913
Chicago Express	Chicago and North Western Railway	Chicago, Illinois - Omaha, Nebraska [1952]	?
Chicago Express	Santa Fe	Chicago, Illinois - Galveston, Texas [1922]	1886-1996; 1901–1960
Chicago Express	Chicago and North Western Railway	Chicago, Illinois - Duluth, Minnesota [1922]	1909-1915; 1919–1926
Chicago Express	Pennsylvania Railroad	Chicago, Illinois - Louisville, Kentucky - Cincinnati, Ohio [1914]	1906-1914
Chicago Express	Pennsylvania Railroad	Chicago, Illinois - Philadelphia, Pennsylvania [1940]	1929-1942
Chicago Express	Erie Railroad	Chicago, Illinois - New York, New York [1930]	1885-1888; 1891; 1914–1915; 1922–1933
Chicago Express	Lehigh Valley Railroad, Grand Trunk Western Railroad	New York, New York - Chicago, Illinois - Toronto, Ontario [1923]	1884-1896; 1903–1905; 1911–1917; 1922–1924
Chicago Express	Baltimore and Ohio Railroad	Chicago, Illinois - Jersey City, New Jersey [1915]	1913-1917
Chicago Express	Chicago, Rock Island and Pacific Railroad	Chicago, Illinois - Minneapolis, Minnesota [1913]	1903-1918
Chicago Express	Chicago Great Western Railway	Chicago, Illinois - Des Moines, Iowa [1930]	1903-1932
Chicago Express	Union Pacific Railroad	Denver, Colorado - Omaha, Nebraska (with through trains to Chicago) [1914]	1914-1918
Chicago Express	Illinois Central Railroad	Chicago, Illinois - St. Louis, Missouri [1923]	1912-1933
Chicago Express	Michigan Central Railroad	Chicago, Illinois - Grand Rapids, Michigan - Detroit, Michigan [1914]	1914-1920
Chicago Fast Mail	Illinois Central Railroad	Chicago, Illinois - New Orleans, Louisiana [1908]	1897-1911
Chicago Fast Mail	Chicago and North Western Railway	Chicago, Illinois - Minneapolis, Minnesota [1906]	1900-1913
Chicago Fast Mail	Santa Fe	Denver, Colorado - Kansas City, Missouri [1910]	1910-1915
Chicago Flyer	Santa Fe	Denver, Colorado - Kansas City, Missouri [1920]	1915-1924
Chicago Limited	Chicago and North Western Railway	Chicago, Illinois - Duluth, Minnesota [1952]	1941-1958
Chicago Limited	Delaware, Lackawanna and Western Railroad, New York, Chicago and St. Louis Railroad	Hoboken, New Jersey - Chicago, Illinois [1930]	1917-1941
Chicago Limited	Monon Railroad	Chicago, Illinois - Indianapolis, Indiana [1928]	1906-1909; 1924–1930
Chicago Limited	Pennsylvania Railroad	New York, New York - Chicago, Illinois	1903–1913
Chicago Limited	Pere Marquette	Chicago, Illinois - Grand Rapids, Michigan [1931]	1920-1936
Chicago Limited	Chicago Great Western Railway	Chicago, Illinois - Des Moines, Iowa - Kansas City, Missouri [1914]	1896-1918
Chicago Limited	Lehigh Valley Railroad, Grand Trunk Western Railroad	Chicago, Illinois - New York, New York [1905]	1897-1908
Chicago Limited	Illinois Central Railroad	Chicago, Illinois - New Orleans, Louisiana [1928]	1917-1930
Chicago Limited	Chicago and Eastern Illinois Railroad	Chicago, Illinois - St. Louis, Missouri [1910]	1908-1913
Chicago Limited	Chicago, Burlington and Quincy Railroad	Chicago, Illinois - Denver, Colorado [1923]	1909-1916; 1923–1924; 1928–1931
Chicago Limited	Chicago, Burlington and Quincy Railroad	Chicago, Illinois - Minneapolis, Minnesota [1910]	1910-1918
Chicago Limited	Cleveland, Cincinnati, Chicago and St. Louis Railway	Chicago, Illinois - Cincinnati, Ohio (with through trains to St. Louis, Richmond, Washington, and other cities) [1926]	1925-1929
Chicago Limited	Chicago, Rock Island and Pacific Railroad	Chicago, Illinois - Des Moines, Iowa [1942]	1942-1947
Chicago Mail	Monon Railroad	Chicago, Illinois - Louisville, Kentucky	?
Chicago Mail	New York Central	Cleveland, Ohio - Chicago, Illinois [1952]	1949-1958
Chicago Mail	Santa Fe	El Paso, Texas - Albuquerque, New Mexico [1911]	1906-1916
Chicago Mail and Express	Cleveland, Cincinnati, Chicago and St. Louis Railway	Chicago, Illinois - Cincinnati, Ohio [1923]	1923-1930
Chicago Mail Express	Pennsylvania	Chicago, Illinois - Pittsburgh, Pennsylvania [1914]	1911-1914
Chicago Mercury	New York Central	Chicago, Illinois - Detroit, Michigan [1951]	1948-1958
Chicago Midnight Express	Pennsylvania	Chicago, Illinois - Louisville, Kentucky - Cincinnati, Ohio [1914]	1906-1916
Chicago Night Express	Baltimore & Ohio	Chicago, Illinois - Wheeling, West Virginia [1952]	1917-1922; 1928–1959
Chicago Night Express	New York Central	St. Louis, Missouri - Cincinnati, Ohio - Chicago, Illinois [1952]	1921-1952
Chicago Night Express	Pennsylvania	Chicago, Illinois - Cincinnati, Ohio (with through trains to Norfolk) [1915]	1915-1950
Chicago Night Special	Cleveland, Cincinnati, Chicago and St. Louis Railway	Chicago, Illinois - Cincinnati, Ohio [1926]	1917-1932
Chicago Northwestern Limited	Chicago and North Western Railway	Chicago, Illinois - Duluth, Minnesota	?
Chicago Special	Michigan Central and affiliated lines	New York, New York - Boston, Massachusetts - Chicago, Illinois [1940]	1906-1943
Chicago Special	Chicago and North Western Railway	Chicago, Illinois - Denver, Colorado [1908]	1902-1910
Chicago Special	Chicago Great Western Railway	Chicago, Illinois - Des Moines, Iowa [1926]	1898-1918; 1921–1932
Chicago Special	Chicago and North Western Railway, Union Pacific Railroad	Chicago, Illinois - Denver, Colorado [1908]	1903-1910
Chicago Special	Chicago, Milwaukee, St. Paul and Pacific Railroad	Chicago, Illinois - Minneapolis, Minnesota [1925]	1923-1928
Chicago Special	Chicago and Eastern Illinois Railroad	Chicago, Illinois - St. Louis, Missouri [1910]	1908-1913
Chicago Special	Illinois Central Railroad	Chicago, Illinois - St. Louis, Missouri [1925]	1925-1930
Chicago Special	New York Central	Chicago, Illinois - Cincinnati, Ohio [1952]	1930-1957
Chicago Vestibule Express	Lehigh Valley Railroad, Grand Trunk Western Railroad	New York, New York - Chicago, Illinois [1904]	1897-1907
Chicago Vestibuled Limited	Alton Railroad	Chicago, Illinois - Kansas City, Missouri [1900]	1892-1904
Chicago - Baltimore Express	Baltimore & Ohio	Jersey City, New Jersey - Chicago, Illinois [1932]	1931-1934
Chicago - Boston Special	Boston and Albany Railroad and affiliated lines	Chicago, Illinois - Boston, Massachusetts [1918]	1913-1920
Chicago - Buffalo Express	New York Central	Chicago, Illinois - Buffalo, New York [1921]	1921-1931
Chicago - Cedar Rapids Express	Rock Island	Chicago, Illinois - Cedar Rapids, Iowa [1912]	1911-1915
Chicago - Cleveland Special	New York Central	Chicago, Illinois - Cleveland, Ohio [1922]	1918-1927
Chicago – Des Moines Rocket	Rock Island	Chicago, Illinois - Des Moines, Iowa [1948]	1941-1949
Chicago - Duluth - Superior Express	Minneapolis, St. Paul and Sault Ste. Marie Railroad	Chicago, Illinois - Duluth, Minnesota [1915]	1913-1917
Chicago - Hot Springs Limited	Rock Island, Illinois Central Railroad	Chicago, Illinois - Hot Springs, Arkansas (Chicago - Hot Springs Special 1919–1924) [1930]	1919-1941
Chicago - Milwaukee - Sault Ste. Marie Express	Minneapolis, St. Paul and Sault Ste. Marie Railroad	Chicago, Illinois - Sault Ste. Marie, Michigan [1920]	1911-1925; 1929–1935
Chicago, Minneapolis and St. Paul Limited			
Chicago - Nashville Limited	Chicago and Eastern Illinois Railroad, Louisville and Nashville Railroad - Atlantic Coast Line Railroad	Chicago, Illinois - Jacksonville, Florida [1908]	1907-1928
Chicago - Nebraska Limited	Chicago, Burlington and Quincy Railroad	Chicago, Illinois - Omaha, Nebraska [1914]	1910-1918
Chicago - Nebraska Limited	Rock Island	Chicago, Illinois - Lincoln, Nebraska [1912]	1912-1918
Chicago - New York Express	Reading	New York, New York - Philadelphia, Pennsylvania [1939]	1938-1941
Chicago - Omaha Express	Illinois Central Railroad	Chicago, Illinois - Omaha, Nebraska (the Illinois Central Railroad also had a Chicago - Omaha Limited around this time) [1914]	1900-1901; 1913–1917
Chicago - Omaha Special	Chicago and North Western Railway	Chicago, Illinois - Omaha, Nebraska [1919]	1919-1927
Chicago - Peoria Rocket	Rock Island	Chicago, Illinois - Peoria, Illinois (the Chicago - Peoria Special 1919–1939) [1941]	1919-1949
Chicago - Pittsburgh - New York Express	Baltimore & Ohio	Jersey City, New Jersey – Chicago, Illinois [1933]	1913-1914; 1933–1944
Chicago - Pittsburgh - Washington Express	Baltimore & Ohio	Chicago, Illinois - Washington, DC [1946]	1919-1932; 1945–1959
Chicago - Pittsburgh - Washington - Baltimore Express	Chicago, Illinois - Minneapolis, Minnesota [1925]	Chicago, Illinois - Baltimore, Maryland [1922]	1919-1931
Chicago - Portland Special	Chicago and North Western Railway, Union Pacific Railroad	Chicago, Illinois - Portland, Oregon [1910]	1901-1910
Chicago - Sioux City Special	Chicago and North Western Railway	Chicago, Illinois - Sioux City, Iowa [1924]	1921-1927
Chicago - St. Louis Express	Chicago and Eastern Illinois Railroad	Chicago, Illinois - St. Louis, Missouri [1922]	1921-1927
Chicago - St. Louis Limited	Chicago and Eastern Illinois Railroad	Chicago, Illinois - St. Louis, Missouri [1915]	1914-1924
Chicago - St. Louis Special	Chicago and Eastern Illinois Railroad	Chicago, Illinois - St. Louis, Missouri [1915]	1914-1922
Chicago - Toronto Express	Lehigh Valley Railroad, Grand Trunk Western Railroad	New York, New York - Philadelphia, Pennsylvania - Toronto, Ontario - Chicago, Illinois [1908]	1908-1915; 1925–1928
Chicago - Twin Cities Express	Rock Island	Chicago, Illinois - Minneapolis, Minnesota [1925]	1911-1936
Chicago - Washington - New York Special	Baltimore & Ohio	Jersey City, New Jersey - Chicago, Illinois [1925]	1920-1930
Chicago - Wheeling Night Express	Baltimore & Ohio	Chicago, Illinois - Wheeling, West Virginia [1924]	1913-1916; 1923–1927
Chicago, Kansas City and Texas Express	Rock Island	Chicago, Illinois - Dallas, Texas [1914]	1910-1930
Chicago, Louisville and Cincinnati Express	Cleveland, Cincinnati, Chicago and St. Louis Railway	Chicago, Illinois - Cincinnati, Ohio [1912]	1903-1914
Chicago, Minneapolis and St. Paul Limited	Illinois Central Railroad, Minneapolis and St. Louis Railway	Chicago, Illinois - Minneapolis, Minnesota [1916]	1903; 1912–1918
Chicago, New York and Boston Special	New York Central and affiliated lines	New York, New York - Boston, Massachusetts - Chicago, Illinois [1900]	
Chicago, Omaha, Sioux City and Sioux Falls Limited	Illinois Central Railroad	Chicago, Illinois - Omaha, Nebraska - Sioux City, Iowa [1915]	1912-1918
Chicago, Pittsburgh and New York Limited	Baltimore & Ohio	Chicago, Illinois - New York, New York [1915]	1912-1916
Chicago, Pittsburgh, Washington and New York Express	Baltimore & Ohio	Chicago, Illinois - Jersey City, New Jersey [1911]	1911-1916
Chicago, Tri Cities-Des Moines Mail	Rock Island	Chicago, Illinois - Des Moines, Iowa [1930]	1922-1931
Chicagoan	Santa Fe	Chicago, Illinois - Kansas City, Missouri - Oklahoma City, Oklahoma [1952]	1916–1929; 1938–1968
Chicagoan	New York Central	New York, New York - Chicago, Illinois [1947]	1932-1938; 1947–1967
Chicagoan	Pennsylvania	Chicago, Illinois - Washington, DC [1925]	1923-1928
Chicagoan	Delaware, Lackawanna and Western Railroad, New York, Chicago and St. Louis Railroad	New York, New York - Chicago, Illinois [1948]	1925-1928; 1943–1949
Chickasaw	Illinois Central Railroad	St. Louis, Missouri - New Orleans, Louisiana [1925]	1924-1968
Chief	Santa Fe	Chicago, Illinois - Los Angeles, California [1960]	1926–1968
China and Japan Fast Mail	Chicago and North Western Railway, Union Pacific Railroad, Southern Pacific	Chicago, Illinois - Los Angeles, California - San Francisco, California - Portland, Oregon [1908]	1906-1913
Chippewa	Milwaukee Road	Chicago, Illinois - Ontonagon, Michigan [1948]	1937-1960 (Chippewa Hiawatha 1949–1957)
Choctaw Rocket	Rock Island	Memphis, Tennessee - Amarillo, Texas [1948]	1925-1958 (Choctaw Limited 1925–1941)
Cigar Valley	New Haven	New York, New York - Springfield, Massachusetts [1953]	1952-1954
Cincinnati and New Orleans Limited	Queen and Crescent Route	Cincinnati, Ohio - New Orleans, Louisiana - Shreveport, Louisiana [1900]	1896-1906
Cincinnati and New York Express	Pennsylvania	New York, New York - Cincinnati, Ohio [1906]	1906-1913
Cincinnati Commercial Express	Pennsylvania	Pittsburgh, Pennsylvania - Cincinnati, Ohio [1918]	1916-1932
Cincinnati Daylight Express	Pennsylvania	Chicago, Illinois - Cincinnati, Ohio [1910]	1906-1952
Cincinnati Express	Pennsylvania	Pittsburgh, Pennsylvania - Cincinnati, Ohio (the Pennsylvania Railroad had several short-lived trains with this name serving different destinations) [1920]	1919-1930
Cincinnati Express	Cleveland, Cincinnati, Chicago and St. Louis Railway	St. Louis, Missouri - Cincinnati, Ohio - Chicago, Illinois [1921]	1916-1922
Cincinnati Express	Baltimore & Ohio	St. Louis, Missouri - Cincinnati, Ohio [1900]	1897-1903
Cincinnati Limited	Pennsylvania; Penn Central (1968–1971)	New York, New York - Cincinnati, Ohio [1965]	1920-1971
Cincinnati Limited	Cleveland, Cincinnati, Chicago and St. Louis Railway	Cincinnati, Ohio - Detroit, Michigan [1918]	1917-1929
Cincinnati Limited	Chicago, Indianapolis & Louisville	Chicago, Illinois - Cincinnati, Ohio [1906]	1906-1909
Cincinnati Mail	Cleveland, Cincinnati, Chicago and St. Louis Railway	Cincinnati, Ohio - Cleveland, Ohio [1928]	1925-1934
Cincinnati Mail and Express	Cleveland, Cincinnati, Chicago and St. Louis Railway	Chicago, Illinois - Cincinnati, Ohio [1923]	1923-1930
Cincinnati Mercury	New York Central	Cincinnati, Ohio - Cleveland, Ohio [1952]	1941, 1951–1957
Cincinnati Midnight Express	Pennsylvania	Chicago, Illinois - Cincinnati, Ohio [1922]	1915-1918; 1922–1926
Cincinnati Midnight Special	Pennsylvania	Chicago, Illinois - Cincinnati, Ohio [1908]	1906-1914
Cincinnati Midnight Special	Cleveland, Cincinnati, Chicago and St. Louis Railway	Cincinnati, Ohio - Cleveland, Ohio [1922]	1913-1933
Cincinnati Night Express	Pennsylvania	Chicago, Illinois - Cincinnati, Ohio [1918]	1914-1924; 1928–1952
Cincinnati Night Express	Cleveland, Cincinnati, Chicago and St. Louis Railway	Chicago, Illinois - Cincinnati, Ohio - Louisville, Kentucky [1935]	1916-1918; 1933–1952
Cincinnati Night Special	Cleveland, Cincinnati, Chicago and St. Louis Railway	Chicago, Illinois - Cincinnati, Ohio - Louisville, Kentucky [1917]	1917-1935
Cincinnati Special	New York Central and its affiliates	Chicago, Illinois - Cincinnati, Ohio [1948]	1911-1916; 1928–1957, 1959–1964
Cincinnati-Washington-New York Express	Baltimore & Ohio	Jersey City, New Jersey - Cincinnati, Ohio [1925]	1919-1928
Cincinnati, Louisville and Chicago Express	Cleveland, Cincinnati, Chicago and St. Louis Railway	Chicago, Illinois - Cincinnati, Ohio - Louisville, Kentucky [1907]	1902; 1906–1910
Cincinnatian	Baltimore and Ohio Railroad	Cincinnati, Ohio - Detroit, Michigan [1948]	1947-1971
Cincinnatian	Monon Railroad	Chicago, Illinois - Cincinnati, Ohio	?
City of Chicago	Nickel Plate, Delaware, Lackawanna and Western Railroad	New York, New York - Chicago, Illinois [1955]	1954–1965
City of Cleveland	Nickel Plate, Delaware, Lackawanna and Western Railroad	New York, New York - Chicago, Illinois [1955]	1954–1965
City of Decatur	Illinois Terminal Railroad	St. Louis, Missouri - Decatur, Illinois [1949]	1949-1950
City of Decatur	Norfolk and Western Railway	Chicago, Illinois - Decatur, Illinois	1968–1971
City of Denver	Chicago and North Western Railway (until 1955), Milwaukee Road (from 1955), Union Pacific	Chicago, Illinois - Denver, Colorado [1958]	1936–1971
City of Kansas City	Wabash	St. Louis, Missouri - Kansas City, Missouri [1949]	1947–1968
City of Kansas City	Union Pacific	Kansas City, Missouri - Los Angeles, California [1969]	1969-1971
City of Las Vegas	Union Pacific	Los Angeles, California - Las Vegas, Nevada [1958]	1956–1961
City of Los Angeles	Chicago and North Western Railway (until 1955), Milwaukee Road (from 1955), Union Pacific	Chicago, Illinois - Los Angeles, California [1948]	1936–1971
City of Memphis	Nashville, Chattanooga & St. Louis	Nashville, Tennessee - Memphis, Tennessee [1948]	1947–1958
City of Mexico	Missouri Pacific	St. Louis, Missouri - Mexico City, Mexico [1940]	1937–1941
City of Miami	Atlantic Coast Line; Central of Georgia; Florida East Coast; Illinois Central	Chicago, Illinois - Miami, Florida [1948]	1940–1971
City of Milwaukee 400	Chicago and North Western Railway	Chicago, Illinois - Milwaukee, Wisconsin [1948]	1942-1958
City of New Orleans	Illinois Central; Amtrak	Chicago, Illinois - New Orleans, Louisiana [1952]	1947-1971 (IC); 1971-present (Amtrak)
City of Portland	Chicago and North Western Railway; Union Pacific	Chicago, Illinois - Portland, Oregon [1940]	1935–1971
City of Salina	Union Pacific	Salina, Kansas - Kansas City, Missouri	1934–1940
City of San Francisco	Chicago and North Western Railway (until 1955), Milwaukee Road (from 1955), Union Pacific; Southern Pacific	Chicago, Illinois - San Francisco, California [1948]	1936–1972
“City of Seattle” (unofficial name)	Union Pacific	Portland, Oregon - Seattle, Washington	1942-?
City of St. Louis	Union Pacific; Wabash	St. Louis, Missouri - Denver, Colorado - San Francisco, California - Los Angeles, California [1948]	1946-1968
Clamdigger	New Haven Railroad	New Haven, Connecticut - Providence, Rhode Island	?
Clamdigger	Amtrak	Washington, DC - Providence, Rhode Island [1977]	1977; 1991
Cleveland and Buffalo Special	Lake Shore and Michigan Southern Railway	Cleveland, Ohio - Buffalo, New York [1910]	1906-1935
Cleveland and Cincinnati Express	Pennsylvania	New York, New York - Cleveland, Ohio - Cincinnati, Ohio [1900]	1900-1910
Cleveland and Cincinnati Special	Cleveland, Cincinnati, Chicago and St. Louis Railway	Cleveland, Ohio - Cincinnati, Ohio [1918]	1917-1918; 1925–1936
Cleveland and Detroit Express	Lake Shore and Michigan Southern Railway	Detroit, Michigan - Cleveland, Ohio [1903]	1901-1913
Cleveland and New York Special	New York Central and its affiliates	New York, New York - Cleveland, Ohio (with through cars to Boston and Toronto; aka Cleveland and New York Express) [1906]	1904-1917
Cleveland Express	New York Central	Cincinnati, Ohio - Cleveland, Ohio (many trains with this name with various end points between 1877 and 1949) [1945]	1870s-1949
Cleveland Limited	New York Central and its affiliates	New York, New York - Cleveland, Ohio [1962]	1910-1967
Cleveland Mail	New York Central	Cleveland, Ohio - Toronto, Ontario [1945]	1942-1948
Cleveland Mail	Cleveland, Cincinnati, Chicago and St. Louis Railway	Detroit, Michigan - Cleveland, Ohio [1919]	1919-1927
Cleveland Mercury	New York Central	Detroit, Michigan - Cleveland, Ohio [1950]	1950-1959
Cleveland Midnight Special	Cleveland, Cincinnati, Chicago and St. Louis Railway	Cincinnati, Ohio - Cleveland, Ohio (with through trains to the south) [1915]	1913-1938
Cleveland Night Express	Baltimore and Ohio Railroad	Baltimore, Maryland - Cleveland, Ohio [1948]	1942–1962
Cleveland Special	New York Central	Cincinnati, Ohio - Cleveland, Ohio [1952]	1919-1924; 1932–1957
Cleveland – Chicago Express	New York Central	Chicago, Illinois - Cleveland, Ohio [1948]	1948-1949
Cleveland - Chicago Special	New York Central	Chicago, Illinois - Cleveland, Ohio [1921]	1918-1927
Cleveland - Cincinnati Express	Cleveland, Cincinnati, Chicago and St. Louis Railway	Cleveland, Ohio - Cincinnati, Ohio [1923]	1923-1928
Cleveland – Cincinnati Night Special	New York Central	St. Louis, Missouri - Cincinnati, Ohio [1942]	1939-1948
Cleveland – Cincinnati Special	New York Central	Cleveland, Ohio - Cincinnati, Ohio [1948]	1929-1930; 1937–1960
Cleveland - Detroit Express	New York Central	Detroit, Michigan - Cleveland, Ohio [1930]	1926-1937
Cleveland - Detroit Special	New York Central	Detroit, Michigan - Cleveland, Ohio [1930]	1926-1931
Cleveland - Indianapolis Special	Cleveland, Cincinnati, Chicago and St. Louis Railway	Detroit, Michigan - Cleveland, Ohio - Indianapolis, Indiana [1926]	1925-1930
Cleveland - New York Express	Erie Railroad	New York, New York - Cleveland, Ohio - Pittsburgh, Pennsylvania [1922]	1922-1927
Cleveland – St. Louis Special	New York Central	Cleveland, Ohio - St. Louis, Missouri [1952]	1931-1956
Cleveland - Washington Night Express	Baltimore and Ohio Railroad	Cleveland, Ohio - Washington, DC [1945]	1942-1946
Cleveland, Cincinnati and Chicago Express	Pennsylvania	New York, New York - Chicago, Illinois (with many different end points over the years) [1920]	1911-1930
Cleveland, Cincinnati and St. Louis Express	New York Central	New York, New York - Cleveland, Ohio - St. Louis, Missouri [1901]	1901-1906
Cleveland, Oil City and Buffalo Express	Erie Railroad	New York, New York - Cleveland, Ohio [1911]	1911-1915
Clevelander	Pennsylvania	New York, New York - Cleveland, Ohio [1948]	1916-1964
Clipper	Detroit and Mackinac Railway	Detroit, Michigan - Alpena, Michigan [1938]	1936-1942
Clocker (group of trains)	Amtrak	New York, New York - Philadelphia, Pennsylvania [1993]	1991-2004
Cloverland	Chicago and North Western Railway	Chicago, Illinois - Ishpeming, Michigan [1939]	1931-1941
Coast Daylight	Southern Pacific; Amtrak	San Francisco, California - Los Angeles, California	1937–1974
Coast Line Florida Mail	Atlantic Coast Line; Richmond, Fredericksburg & Potomac	New York, New York - Tampa, Florida [1941]	1921-1942
Coast Starlight	Amtrak	Los Angeles, California - Seattle, Washington [2013]	1971–present
Coast-to-Coast Limited	Seaboard Air Line Railroad	St. Petersburg, Florida - West Palm Beach, Florida [1925]	1925-1927
Coastal Classic	Alaska Railroad	Anchorage, Alaska - Seward, Alaska	?-present
Coaster	Southern Pacific	Los Angeles, California - San Francisco, California [1948]	1905; 1908–1916; 1928–1949
Colonial	Pennsylvania Railroad; New York, New Haven and Hartford Railroad; Penn Central; Amtrak	Washington, DC - New York, New York - Boston, Massachusetts [1952]	1892-1971 (PRR-NH); 1971-1973; 1976–2992; 1998 (Amtrak)
Colorado and California Express	Rock Island, Denver and Rio Grande Western Railroad, Southern Pacific	Chicago, Illinois - San Francisco, California [1915]	1906-1918
Colorado and New Mexico Express	Denver and Rio Grande Western Railroad	Denver, Colorado - Alamosa, Colorado (many other endpoints) [1929]	1896; 1901–1913; 1929–1936
Colorado and St. Louis Express	Rock Island	St. Louis, Missouri - Denver, Colorado [1919]	1919-1927; 1931–1934
Colorado Eagle	Denver and Rio Grande Western, Missouri Pacific	St. Louis, Missouri - Denver, Colorado [1942]	1942–1964
Colorado Express	Rock Island	Kansas City, Missouri - Denver, Colorado [1948]	1919-1950
Colorado Express	Chicago, Milwaukee, St. Paul and Pacific Railroad, Union Pacific Railroad	Chicago, Illinois - Denver, Colorado [1904]	1904-1905; 1915–1921
Colorado Express	Denver and Rio Grande Railroad	Denver, Colorado - Salida, Colorado [1902]	1901-1914
Colorado Express	Chicago & North Western; Union Pacific	Chicago, Illinois - Denver, Colorado [1912]	1908-1930
Colorado Express	Santa Fe	Chicago, Illinois - Denver, Colorado [1912]	1905-1931
Colorado Fast Mail	Santa Fe	Chicago, Illinois - Denver, Colorado [1912]	1910-1925
Colorado Flyer	Rock Island	St. Louis, Missouri - Colorado Springs, Colorado [1911]	1903; 1911–1930
Colorado Flyer	Santa Fe	Chicago, Illinois - Denver, Colorado [1912]	1902-1934
Colorado Limited	Chicago, Burlington and Quincy	Chicago, Illinois - Denver, Colorado [1923]	1911-1918; 1923–1938
Colorado Special	Chicago and North Western Railway	Chicago, Illinois - Denver, Colorado [1916]	1898-1910; 1916–1927
Colorado Special	Chicago, Milwaukee, St. Paul and Pacific Railroad, Union Pacific Railroad	Chicago, Illinois - Denver, Colorado [1916]	1899; 1906–1919
Colorado Springs and Denver Express	Denver and Rio Grande Railroad, Missouri Pacific Railroad	St. Louis, Missouri - Denver, Colorado [1921]	1918-1930
Colorado Springs and Eastern Express	Denver and Rio Grande Railroad, Missouri Pacific Railroad	St. Louis, Missouri - Denver, Colorado [1928]	1925-1930
Colorado Springs, Pueblo, Eastern Express	Denver and Rio Grande Railroad, Missouri Pacific Railroad	St. Louis, Missouri - Denver, Colorado [1915]	1915-1924
Colorado, Utah and New Mexico Express	Denver and Rio Grande Railroad	Denver, Colorado - Salt Lake City, Utah [1915]	1915-1928
Coloradoan	Chicago, Burlington and Quincy	Chicago, Illinois - Denver, Colorado [1952]	1950-1963
Columbia River Express	Spokane, Portland & Seattle	Portland, Oregon - Pasco, Washington [1952]	1929-1959
Columbian	Baltimore and Ohio	Jersey City, New Jersey - Washington, DC [1935]	1931-1941
Columbian	Baltimore and Ohio	Jersey City, New Jersey - Chicago, Illinois [1952]	1941–1958
Columbian	Baltimore and Ohio	Baltimore, Maryland - Chicago, Illinois [1958]	1958–1964
Columbian	Milwaukee Road	Chicago, Illinois - Tacoma, Washington [1948]	1911–1930; 1947–1955
Columbine	Chicago & North Western; Union Pacific	Chicago, Illinois - Denver, Colorado [1933]	1927–1950
Columbus and Cincinnati Express	Cleveland, Cincinnati, Chicago and St. Louis Railway and affiliated lines	New York, New York - Boston, Massachusetts - Cincinnati, Ohio [1902]	1902-1919
Columbus - Cincinnati Special	Cleveland, Cincinnati, Chicago and St. Louis Railway	Cleveland, Ohio - Cincinnati, Ohio [1922]	1917-1948
Columbus - Cleveland Express	Cleveland, Cincinnati, Chicago and St. Louis Railway	Cleveland, Ohio - Cincinnati, Ohio [1922]	1917-1928
Comet	New Haven	Boston, Massachusetts - Providence, Rhode Island	1935-c. 1942
Commander	New Haven	New York, New York - Boston, Massachusetts [1942]	1942-1950; 1954–1956
Commercial Express	Pennsylvania Railroad	New York, New York - St. Louis, Missouri [1915]	1913-1933; 1936–1942
Commercial Limited	Chicago, Burlington and Quincy	Chicago, Illinois - Minneapolis, Minnesota [1912]	1911-1914; 1927–1930
Commercial Traveler	Clover Leaf (New York, Chicago and St. Louis Railroad from 1923)	St. Louis, Missouri - Toledo, Ohio [1913]	1902-1931
Commodore	Pennsylvania Railroad	Philadelphia, Pennsylvania - Long Branch, New Jersey [1935]	1933-1938
Commodore Vanderbilt	New York Central	Chicago, Illinois - New York, New York [1956]	1929-1960
Commuter 400	Chicago and North Western Railway	Chicago, Illinois - Milwaukee, Wisconsin (called the 'Commuter' before 1942) [1948]	1936-1968
Concord	Amtrak	Boston, Massachusetts - Washington, DC [1997]	1997-1998
Congressional	Pennsylvania Railroad	Washington, DC - New York, New York [1948]	1882-1949
Congressional	Amtrak	Washington, DC - New York, New York [1990]	1978-1994; 1997–1998
Connecticut Yankee	Boston and Maine, New York, New Haven and Hartford (until 1968), Penn Central (1969–1971), Amtrak (from 1971)	Boston & New York, New York - Quebec City, Quebec [1946] - Washington, DC - Springfield, Massachusetts [1983]	1936-1977; 1983–1995
Constitution	Pennsylvania Railroad	Washington, DC - New York, New York [1948]	1933-1956
Continental Limited	Wabash (and connecting lines)	St. Louis, Missouri - Chicago, Illinois - New York, New York - Boston, Massachusetts [1916]	1898-1917
Continental Limited	Chicago & North Western, Union Pacific Railroad, Southern Pacific	Chicago, Illinois - San Francisco, California [1921]	1921-1931
Coos Bay Limited	Southern Pacific Railroad	Portland, Oregon - Marshfield, Oregon [1917]	1917–1953
Copper Country Limited	Milwaukee Road, Duluth, South Shore & Atlantic (until December 1960); Soo Line (after December 1960)	Chicago, Illinois - Champion, Michigan - Calumet, Michigan [1925]	1908-1968
Corn Belt Special	Peoria and Eastern Railway (operated by New York Central)	Indianapolis, Indiana - Pekin, Illinois	1955-1957
Corn Belt Rocket	Rock Island	Chicago, Illinois - Omaha, Nebraska [1952]	1948-1967
Corn King	Chicago & North Western	Chicago, Illinois - Omaha, Nebraska [1933]	1929-1941
Cotton Belter	St. Louis Southwestern	St. Louis, Missouri - Dallas, Texas [1939]	1939–1941
Cotton Blossom	Richmond, Fredericksburg and Potomac Railroad, Seaboard Air Line Railroad	Washington, DC - Birmingham, Alabama [1952]	1947-1955
Cotton States Special	Seaboard Air Line, Pennsylvania Railroad, Richmond, Fredericksburg and Potomac Railroad	New York, New York and Portsmouth, Virginia - Birmingham, Alabama [1942]	1934–1947
Coyote	Colorado Midland Railway	Denver, Colorado - Grand Junction, Colorado [1900]	1900-1908
Cracker	Southern Railway	Atlanta, Georgia - Brunswick, Georgia [1945]	1940-1952
Cranberry	New Haven	Boston, Massachusetts - Woods Hole, Massachusetts	c. 1949 - c. 1958
Cream City Special	Chicago North Shore and Milwaukee Railroad	Chicago, Illinois - Milwaukee, Wisconsin [1930]	1929-1933
Creole	Illinois Central	Chicago, Illinois and Louisville, Kentucky - New Orleans, Louisiana [1938]	1931-1946; 1954–1967
Crescent	Southern Railway; Amtrak	New York, New York - New Orleans, Louisiana (also called 'Southern Crescent' and 'Crescent Limited' for many years) [2014]	1891-1979 (Southern); 1979-present (Amtrak)
Crescent City Special	Southern Railway	Cincinnati, Ohio - New Orleans, Louisiana [1920]	1917-1924
Crescent City Special	Cleveland, Cincinnati, Chicago and St. Louis Railway	Danville, Illinois - Evansville, Indiana [1935]	1931-1938
Cross-Florida Limited	Seaboard Air Line	St. Petersburg, Florida - West Palm Beach, Florida [1926]	c.1925-c.1930
Cross-Florida Night Limited	Seaboard Air Line	St. Petersburg, Florida - Miami, Florida	1927-1930
Crusader	Reading; Conrail from 1976	Philadelphia, Pennsylvania - Jersey City, New Jersey [1940]	1937–1968; 1973–1980
Cumberland	Boston & Maine	Portland, Maine - Boston, Massachusetts [1952]	1951-1956
Curfew	Chicago and Eastern Illinois Railroad	Chicago, Illinois - St. Louis, Missouri [1925]	1925-1930

== See also ==
- Lists of named passenger trains
