= Big Four Depot =

Big Four Depot may refer to:

- Lafayette, Indiana (Amtrak station), listed on the NRHP in Indiana as "Big Four Depot"
- Big Four Depot (Delaware, Ohio), in operation to 1965
- Big Four Depot (Galion, Ohio), listed on the NRHP in Ohio
- Big Four Depot (Middletown, Ohio), listed on the NRHP in Ohio
- Big Four Depot (Springfield, Ohio), in operation to 1969
- Big Four Depot (Terre Haute, Indiana), more recently an Amtrak station
