= Muncie Union Station =

Coordinates: 40°11′16.5″N 85°23′16″W

Muncie
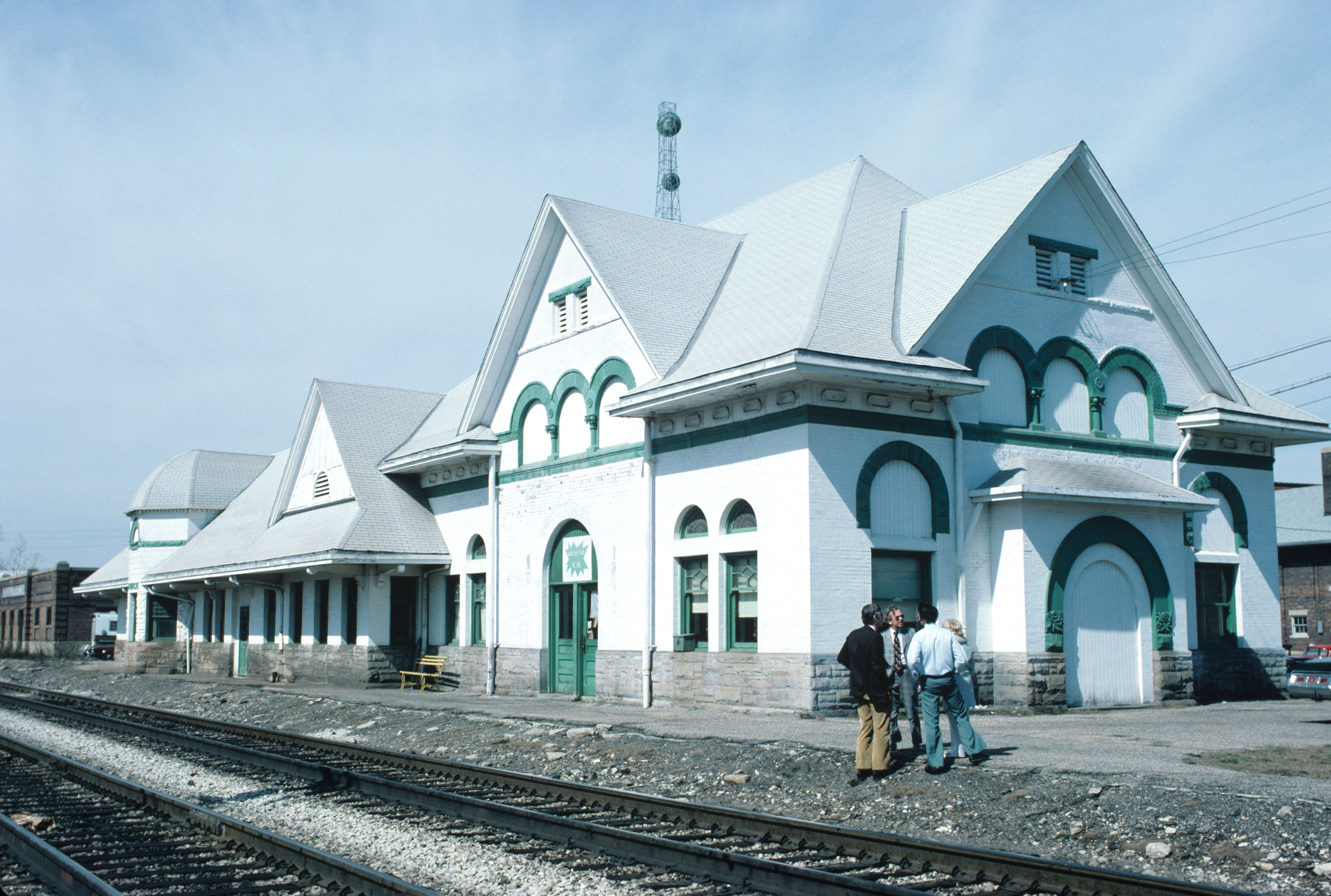
- Muncie Union Station in 1976

General information
- Location: 630 South High Street; Muncie, Indiana

History
- Closed: April 30, 1971

Services
Preceding station	New York Central Railroad	Following station
Anderson toward St. Louis	Big Four Route Main Line	Union City toward Cleveland
Yorktown toward St. Louis	Big Four Route Main Line	Selma toward Cleveland
Preceding station	Nickel Plate Road	Following station
Gilman toward Peoria	Peoria – Fostoria	De Soto toward Fostoria

Muncie Union Station was a passenger railroad station in Muncie, Indiana. As a union station, in earlier decades it served the Cleveland, Cincinnati, Chicago and St. Louis Railway (the 'Big Four') and the New York, Chicago and St. Louis Railroad (the 'Nickel Plate Road'). Made of limestone, it was built in 1883 in the Romanesque Revival style, for the CCC & St. L. Other stations in Muncie served the Chesapeake and Ohio Railway, the Muncie Street Railway and the Pennsylvania Railroad.

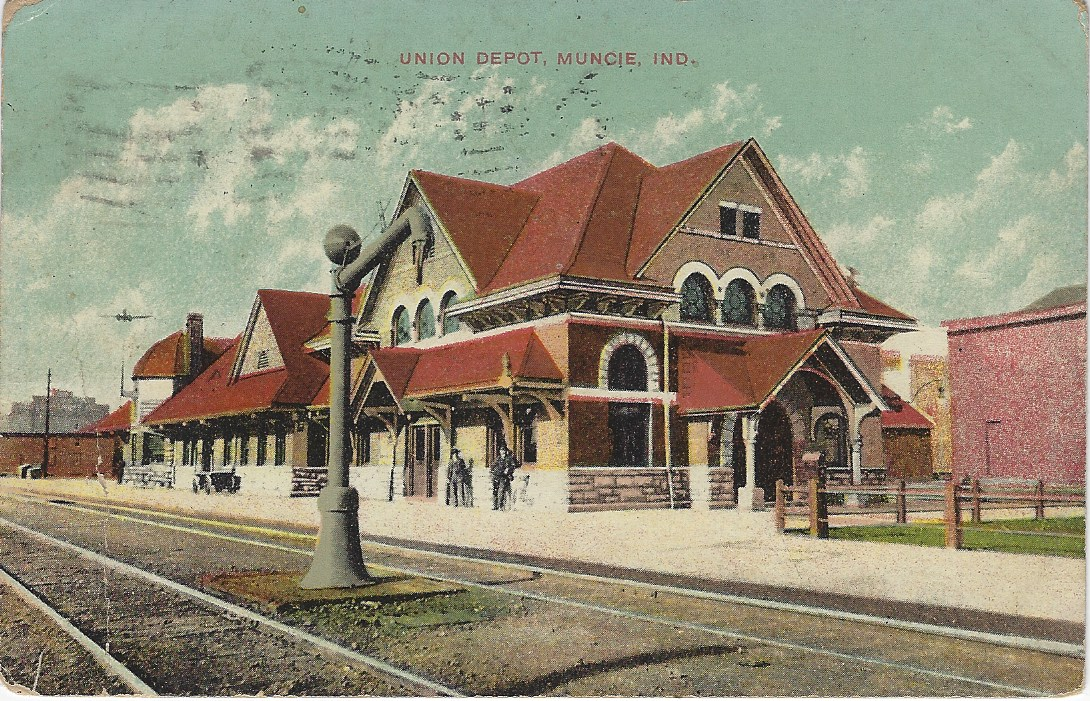
Muncie Union Station, view of the station, ca. 1910

In later years the New York Central, the parent company for the CCC & St. L., continued passenger trains in its own name. In 1959, the last Nickel Plate passenger trains left the station. The final passenger trains, discontinued in the liquidation of routes for the switchover to Amtrak in 1971, were unnamed Indianapolis - Cleveland Penn Central east- and westbound remnants of the Southwestern Limited. The station was demolished by 1990.

== Noteworthy passenger services ==
The station hosted several named long-distance passenger trains.

- New York Central:
  - Detroit Night Express—St. Louis eastbound to Detroit
  - Indianapolis Express—Detroit westbound to St. Louis
  - Knickerbocker—St. Louis - New York City via Cleveland, east- and westbound
  - Southwestern Limited—St. Louis - New York City via Cleveland, east- and westbound
- Nickel Plate:
  - Blue Dart—St. Louis eastbound to Cleveland
  - Blue Arrow—Cleveland westbound to St. Louis

== See also ==
- Cincinnati, Richmond, & Muncie Depot (Muncie, Indiana)
