= Marion Union Station =

Defunct passenger railroad station

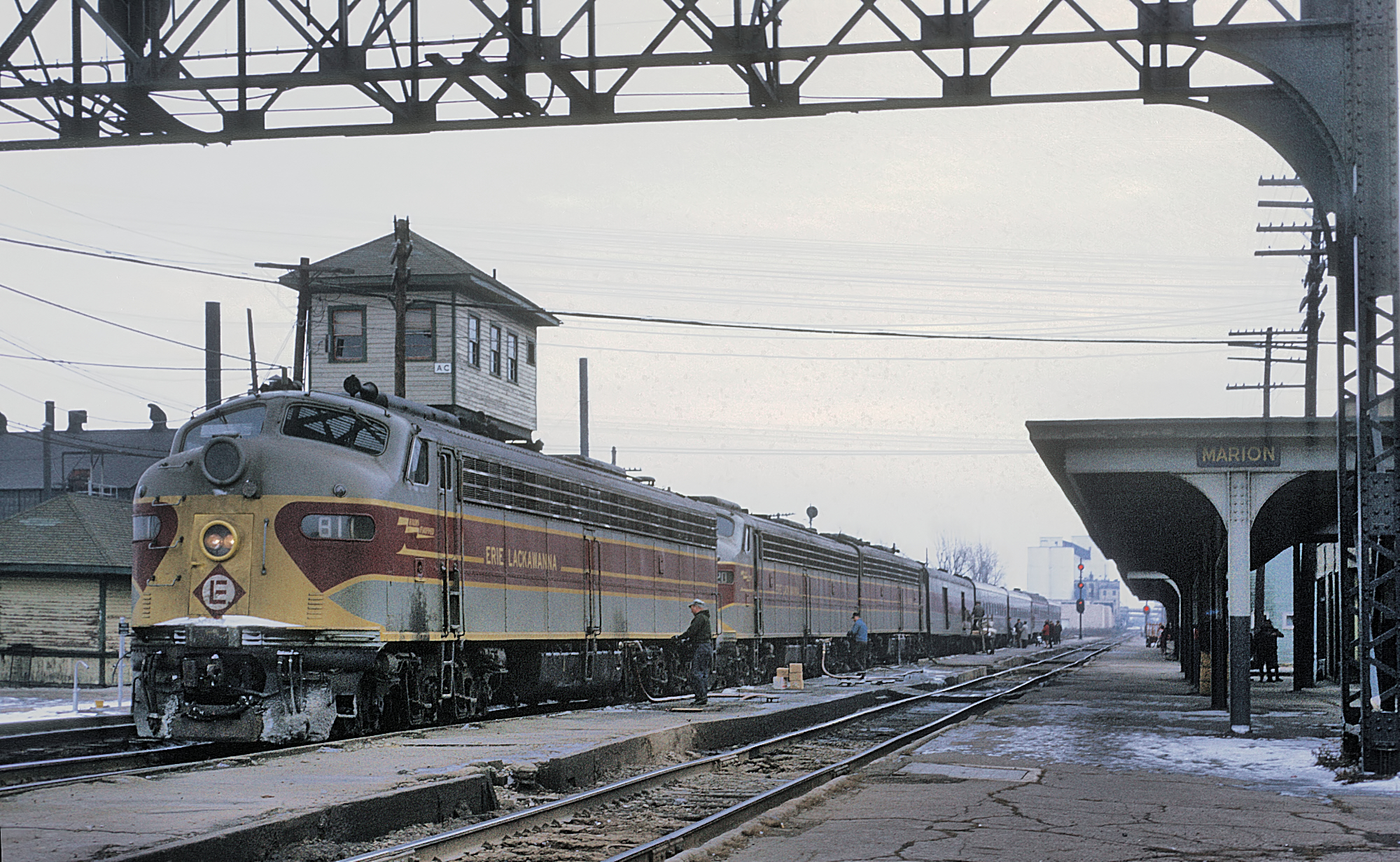
- The Lake Cities at Marion Union Station in 1969

General information
- Location: 532 West Center Street, Marion, Ohio 43302
- Coordinates: 40.589370°N 83.140607°W
- Line: Main Line (Kent Division)
- Platforms: 6 side platforms
- Tracks: 4

Other information
- Station code: 5909 (Erie Railroad)

History
- Opened: July 31,1902
- Closed: January 6, 1970 (Erie-Lackawanna Railroad); April 30, 1971 (Penn Central)

Former services
Preceding station	Chesapeake and Ohio Railway	Following station
Morral toward Toledo	Hocking Valley Railway; Main Line	Owens toward Athens
Preceding station	Erie Railroad	Following station
De Cliff toward Chicago	Main Line	Caledonia toward Jersey City
Green Camp toward Dayton	Cincinnati Division	Terminus
Preceding station	New York Central Railroad	Following station
Union City toward St. Louis	Big Four Route Main Line	Galion toward Cleveland
Longville toward St. Louis	Big Four Route Main Line	Caledonia toward Cleveland
Location

Marion Union Station is a former passenger railroad station at 532 W. Center Street in Marion, Ohio, United States. As a union station it served several train lines: the Chesapeake and Ohio Railway, Cleveland, Cincinnati, Chicago and St. Louis Railway or CCC & St. L. (acquired in 1906 by the New York Central Railroad), and Erie Railroad (and its successor Erie Lackawanna Railroad). These lines intersected at the station, so it was a significant transfer point between different geographic points.

== History ==
It was built in 1902 (opening on July 31), it featured marble walls and patterned mosaic tiles on the floor. In 1923, it was the last stop on President Warren Harding's funeral train. It was a canteen stop for soldiers during World War II. It had its last long-distance train in 1971 with the end of the Chesapeake & Ohio's connector line to the George Washington.

Into the 1960s, it was a stop for several long-distance passenger trains on the following railroads:

- Chesapeake and Ohio
  - Sportsman (Detroit, MI – Newport News and Washington, D.C., via Toledo, Columbus and Charlottesville); in last years a connector line for the George Washington
- Erie Railroad (and after 1960: Erie Lackawanna)
  - Atlantic Express and Pacific Express (Chicago, IL – Hoboken, NJ)
  - Erie Limited (Chicago, IL – Hoboken, NJ)
  - Lake Cities (Chicago, IL – Hoboken, NJ)
- New York Central
  - Cleveland Special / Gateway (St. Louis, MO – Cleveland, OH)
  - Southwestern Limited (St. Louis, MO – New York, NY)

== Disposition today ==
Presently the station is the site of a museum run by the Marion Union Station Association.

About 60 CSX and Norfolk Southern freight trains pass by each day.
