= Union City station (New York Central Railroad) =

Railway station in Union City, the United States of America

Union City
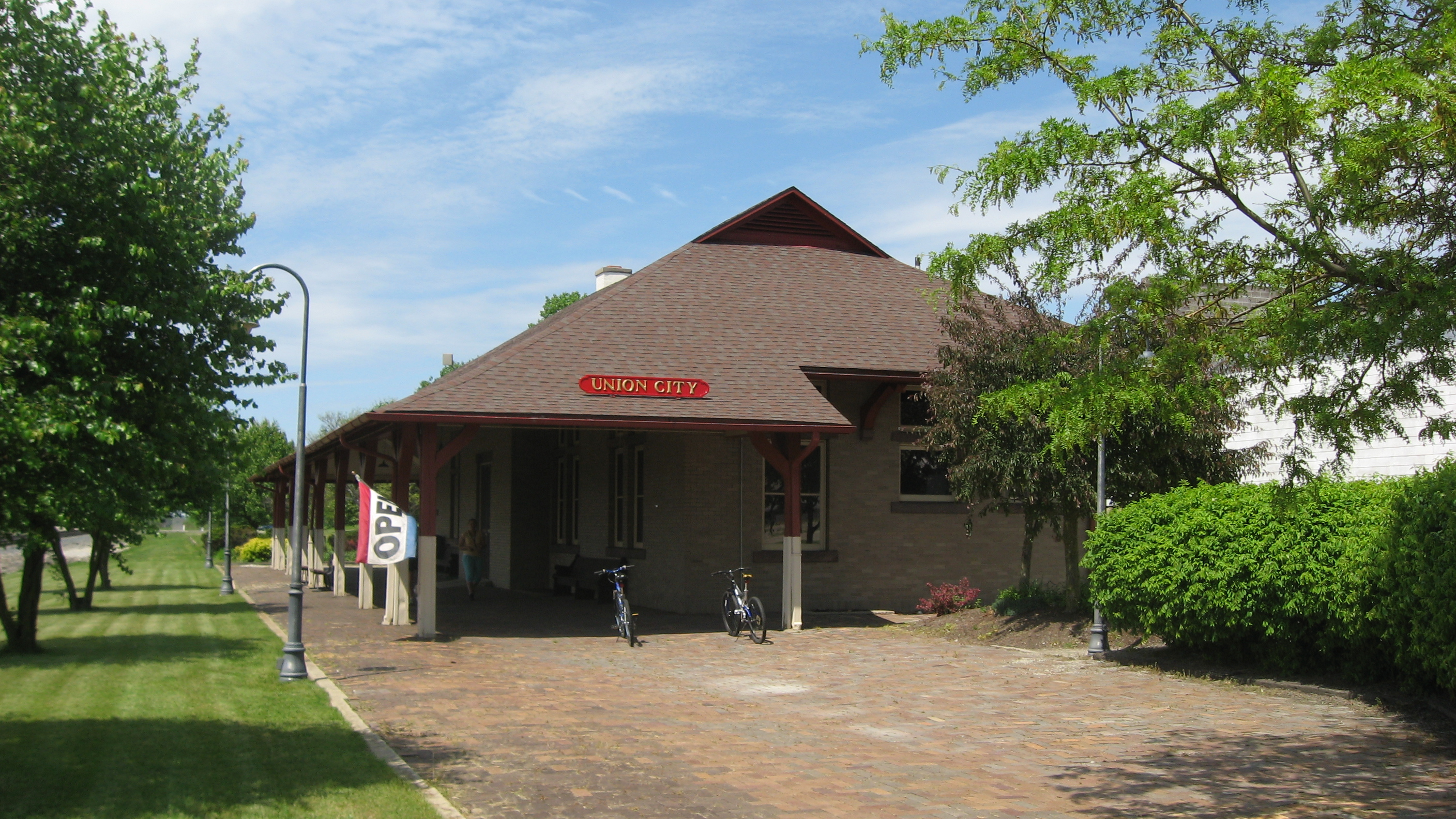
- Union City Passenger Depot, May 2010

General information
- Location: Union City, Indiana

History
- Closed: April 30, 1971

Former services
Preceding station	New York Central Railroad	Following station
Muncie toward St. Louis	Big Four Route Main Line	Marion toward Cleveland
Harrisville toward St. Louis	Big Four Route Main Line	Elroy toward Cleveland
- Union City Passenger Depot
- U.S. National Register of Historic Places
- Location within Indiana Location within the United States
- Location: Howard St., Union City, Indiana
- Coordinates: 40°11′52″N 84°48′36″W
- Area: less than one acre
- Built: 1913
- Architectural style: Prairie School, Stick/eastlake
- NRHP reference No.: 83000145
- Added to NRHP: May 19, 1983
Location

Union City is a historic train station located at Union City, Indiana. It was built in 1876, and is a one-story, rectangular, brick building with limestone trim. It measures 92 feet long and has a modified hipped roof. The building features wide overhanging eaves in the Prairie School style and Stick Style / Eastlake movement influences. It was remodeled between 1925 and 1930.

It was listed on the National Register of Historic Places in 1983 as the Union City Passenger Depot.
