= Delaware Station =

Delaware Station may refer to:

- Delaware, Warren County, New Jersey, US, commonly called Delaware Station, established by an owner of the Delaware, Lackawanna and Western Railroad
- Big Four Depot (Delaware, Ohio), former Big Four and New York Central station in Delaware, Ohio, US
