= Ohio State Limited =

American named passenger train (1924–1967)

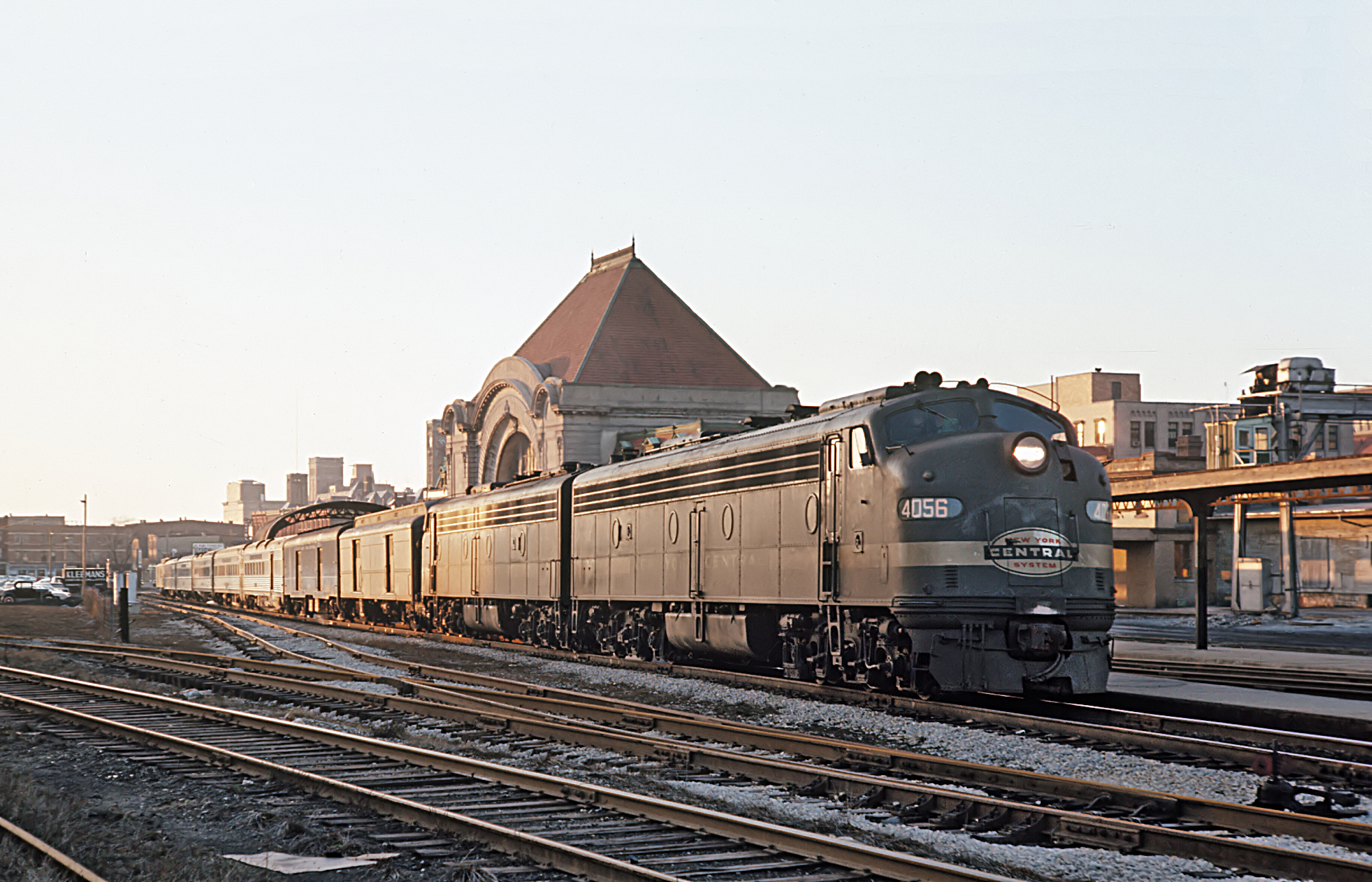
- The Ohio State Limited at Springfield, Ohio, in 1965

Overview
- Service type: Inter-city rail
- Status: Discontinued
- First service: April 27, 1924
- Last service: December 2, 1967
- Successor: Unnamed local services
- Former operator: New York Central Railroad

Route
- Termini: Grand Central Terminal; Cincinnati Union Terminal
- Distance travelled: 880 miles (1,416 km)
- Average journey time: 16 hours 15 minutes
- Service frequency: Daily
- Train number: 15/16
- Line used: Water Level Route

On-board services
- Seating arrangements: Reclining seat coaches, all seats reserved [1957]
- Sleeping arrangements: Roomettes and double bedrooms
- Catering facilities: Dining service
- Observation facilities: Lounge sleeping car
Route map

The Ohio State Limited was a United States named passenger train operated by the New York Central Railroad (NYC) between New York City and Cincinnati, Ohio, via Buffalo and Cleveland, Ohio. Service began in 1924 and continued until 1967, with some vestiges remaining until 1971.

== History ==
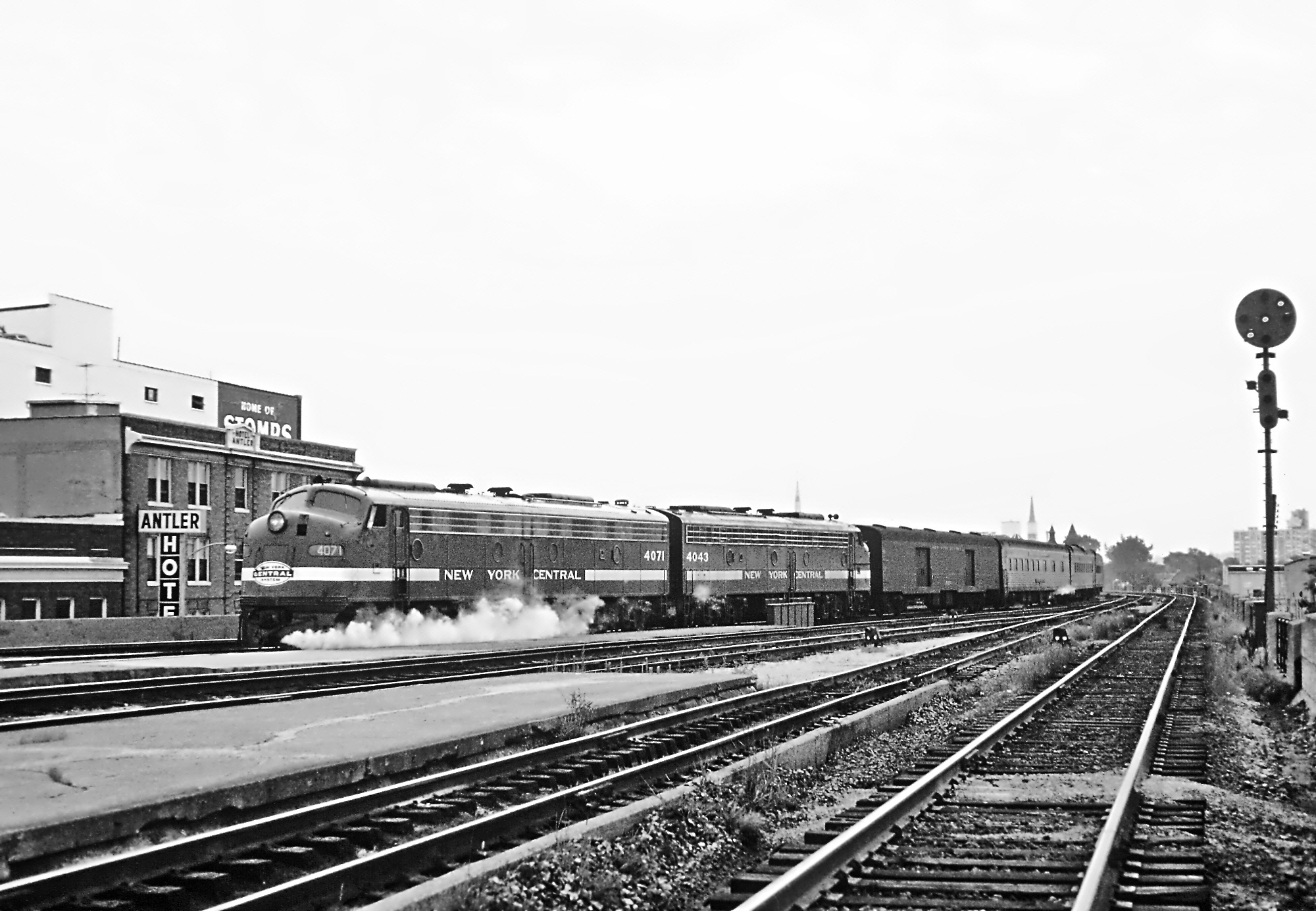
The Ohio State Limited arriving at Dayton Union Station in September 1967, three months before service ended

NYC began the Ohio State Limited on April 27, 1924. The new service departed Grand Central Terminal at 3 PM, just after the 20th Century Limited, with a scheduled arrival in Cincinnati of 9:30 AM the following morning. A section of the train split at Cleveland, Ohio to serve Toledo, Ohio, while the Boston & Albany Railroad exchanged through cars for Boston, Massachusetts at Albany, New York. The train used the Big Four route between Toledo and Cincinnati. In 1941 the Ohio State Limited began receiving lightweight streamlined equipment, becoming part of the NYC's famed "Great Steel Fleet." The train was fully re-equipped with lightweight equipment by 1949. Its chief postwar rival was the Pennsylvania Railroad's Cincinnati Limited.

By 1960 the eastbound trip of train at Buffalo picked up coaches and sleeping cars from the NYC's #376, from Toronto, Ontario for continuous service to New York City. The NYC's Cleveland Limited from New York City to Buffalo likewise carried coaches and sleepers for a counterpart northwest-bound train (NYC #371) to Toronto. In 1962 the Ohio State Limited was one of several NYC trains to receive the new slumbercoach economy sleeping cars in a failed attempt to revive flagging business. In the early 1960s the Ohio State Limited ran combined with the New York-St. Louis Southwestern Limited between New York-Cleveland as a cost-saving measure.

The end came on December 2, 1967, when NYC eliminated all named trains in anticipation of a transition toward short-haul corridor services. The last remnant of the Ohio State Limited was a rump coach trip between Cleveland-Cincinnati, often running with a single car. This remained the case after the Penn Central merger and survived until Amtrak took over most passenger services on May 1, 1971, when it was discontinued. The alternate Toronto-New York City itinerary would be restored in 1981 when Amtrak initiated the Maple Leaf.

== Major stops prior to 1967 ==
These were stops at sizable locales on the route west:

- New York City
- Yonkers
- Poughkeepsie
- Albany
- Utica
- Syracuse
- Rochester
- Buffalo
- Erie
- Cleveland
- Columbus
- Springfield
- Dayton
- Cincinnati
