= Galion station =

Galion station may refer to:

- Big Four Depot (Galion, Ohio), closed by New York Central in 1971
- Erie Station (Galion, Ohio), a station on the Erie Lackawanna Railroad; last used by the passenger train Lake Cities
