= Delaware station (New York Central Railroad) =

- Cleveland, Columbus, Cincinnati & Indianapolis Railroad Depot
- U.S. National Register of Historic Places
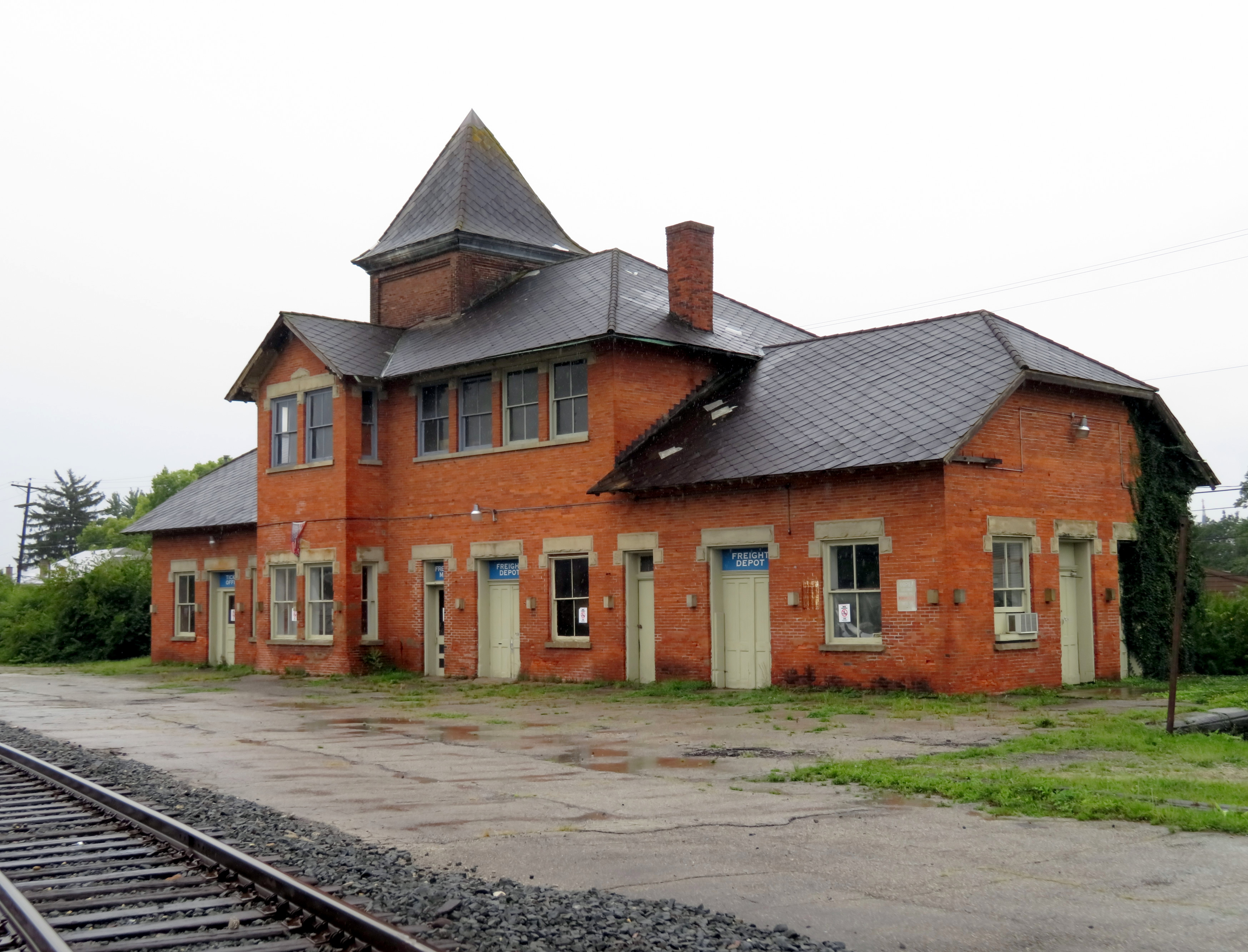
- Location: 60 Lake Street
- Coordinates: 40.300479°N 83.058555°W
- NRHP reference No.: 100008393
- Added to NRHP: November 21, 2022

Delaware Big Four Depot was completed in 1887 by the Cleveland, Columbus, Cincinnati and Indianapolis Railway (CCC&I). The brick structure is in Delaware, Ohio, on the east side of the Olentangy River, and opposite side of the river from Ohio Wesleyan University. The building was a successor to an earlier frame structure built in the 1850s.

The CCC&I was absorbed two years later into the Cleveland, Cincinnati, Chicago and St. Louis Railway, also commonly known as the 'Big Four.' Cleveland, Cincinnati, Chicago and St. Louis Railway in 1906 acquired the CCC&I; however, the Big Four operated as a separate entity until 1930 when the Big Four was fully absorbed into New York Central operations. In Delaware, Ohio, two other railroads, the Chesapeake & Ohio Railway and Pennsylvania Railroad had stations with passenger service. Yet, the Big Four Depot was the far busier station.

In 1944, in the latter years of World War II there were several trains a day. In each direction (north and south) four trains on the Cincinnati-Columbus-Cleveland corridor: three daily and one daily except Sunday train; additionally, there was a Cincinnati-Cleveland train making daily stops at the station.

By the early 1960s, service declined to a Cincinnati-Columbus-Cleveland train, the Night Special. The train ceased stopping at the station on November 19, 1965. The station continued for few years as a freight depot.

The building is extant. Preservationists and other community activists have sought protect and renovate the building. In 2018 the building was added to Preservation Ohio's list of most endangered historic sites. It was listed on the National Register of Historic Places in 2022.

The city of Delaware had other stations, run by the Pennsylvania Railroad and Chesapeake and Ohio Railway, respectively. The C&O continued to run a train north to Detroit and south to Ashland, Kentucky until 1971.

Preceding station	New York Central Railroad	Following station
Pershing toward Cincinnati	Cincinnati – Cleveland	Leonardsburg toward Cleveland
Scioto toward Springfield, OH	Delaware Branch	Terminus
