= Galion station (New York Central Railroad) =

Former train station

Coordinates: 40°44′04″N 82°47′02″W

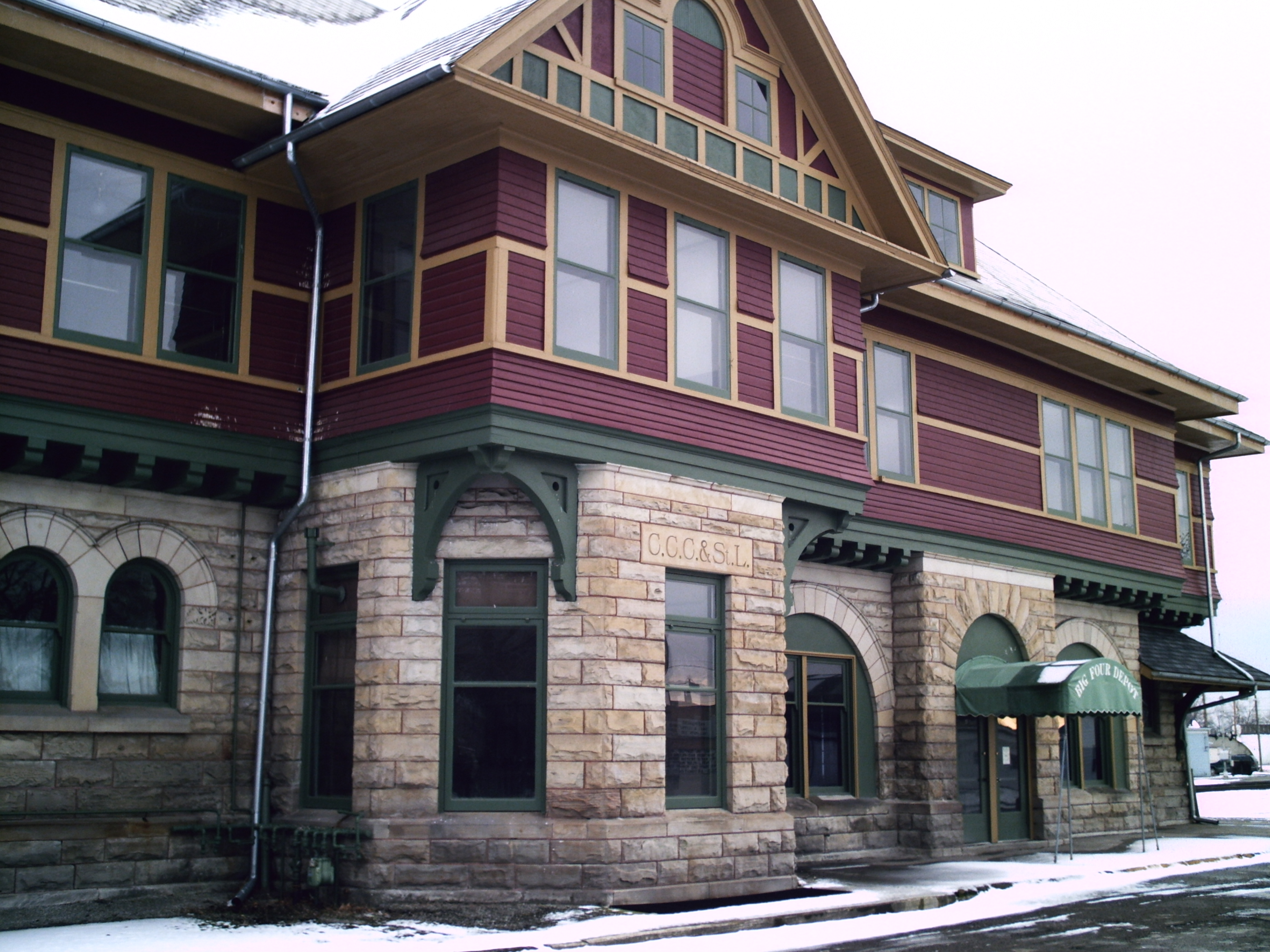
The Big Four Depot of Galion in winter, 2006

The Big Four Depot of Galion, Ohio was a passenger train station serving the Cleveland, Cincinnati, Chicago and St. Louis Railway, commonly known as the 'Big Four Depot,' and the New York Central Railroad. The brick and wood-constructed building, still intact, is located at 127 Washington Street at Harding Way. It was one of two railroad stations in the city, the other serving the Erie Railroad.

== Big Four Depot's heyday ==
The building was opened in 1900, and it served as a Big Four division headquarters. Passenger trains northeast from the station headed to Cleveland. Trains southwest from the station headed to Indianapolis and St. Louis; trains headed south from the station to Columbus, Dayton and Cincinnati. Peak usage occurred during and after World War I, with about 32 trains a day stopping there. Major political party presidential nominees, including Al Smith, Franklin D. Roosevelt and Dwight D. Eisenhower, appeared at the station in the course of their campaigns.

In 1947, in the post-World War II period, the station remained busy with New York Central passenger trains bound in multiple directions:

- Cincinnati - Columbus - Cleveland route:
  - Cleveland and Cincinnati Special, Midnight Special, New York Special (section connecting with main part of the New York-bound train in Cleveland), Ohio State Limited (bound for New York after Cleveland), Water Level Route (section connecting with main part of the New York-bound train in Cleveland), Cleveland Express (operating only from Columbus), plus a six-day a week unnamed train and one daily unnamed trains on the same route
- St. Louis - Indianapolis - Cleveland route:
  - Southwestern Limited (continuing beyond Cleveland to New York City), and three other trains heading to Cleveland
- Florida-bound trains:
  - Cleveland-Cincinnati sections of the trains operated mainly by the Southern Railway, Florida Sunbeam, Ponce de Leon and Royal Palm

== Latter years ==
High traffic in the above directions remained into the latter 1950s. The final year of the building's use as a train station was 1969, when the Penn Central was operating an unnamed remnant train of the Southwestern Limited from Cleveland to Indianapolis and an unnamed remnant train of the Ohio State Limited from Cleveland to Columbus. However, these two segments continued to stop in Galion until 1971, when Amtrak assumed responsibility for long-distance passenger train operations.

The building was listed in the National Register of Historic Places in 1974 or 1975. The city of Galion acquired the building in 2000; and the building is managed by Galion Depot, Inc., established in 2015. The organization's purpose is "preserve, restore and rehabilitate the Galion Big Four Depot and to educate the public on local history and the community’s rich railroad and industrial heritage." Volunteers have performed physical improvement work on the station building in recent years. Station preservationists held an event in 2021, an event, 'Depot Day,' that would include citing of goals in Amtrak's plans for expansion of passenger train service in Ohio. Exterior structural improvements have been performed, through private contractors, in recent years.

Preceding station	New York Central Railroad	Following station
Marion toward St. Louis	Big Four Route Main Line	Berea toward Cleveland
Martel toward St. Louis	Big Four Route Main Line	Crestline toward Cleveland
St. James toward Cincinnati	Cincinnati – Cleveland	Crestline toward Cleveland
