= Springfield station (Ohio) =

Springfield
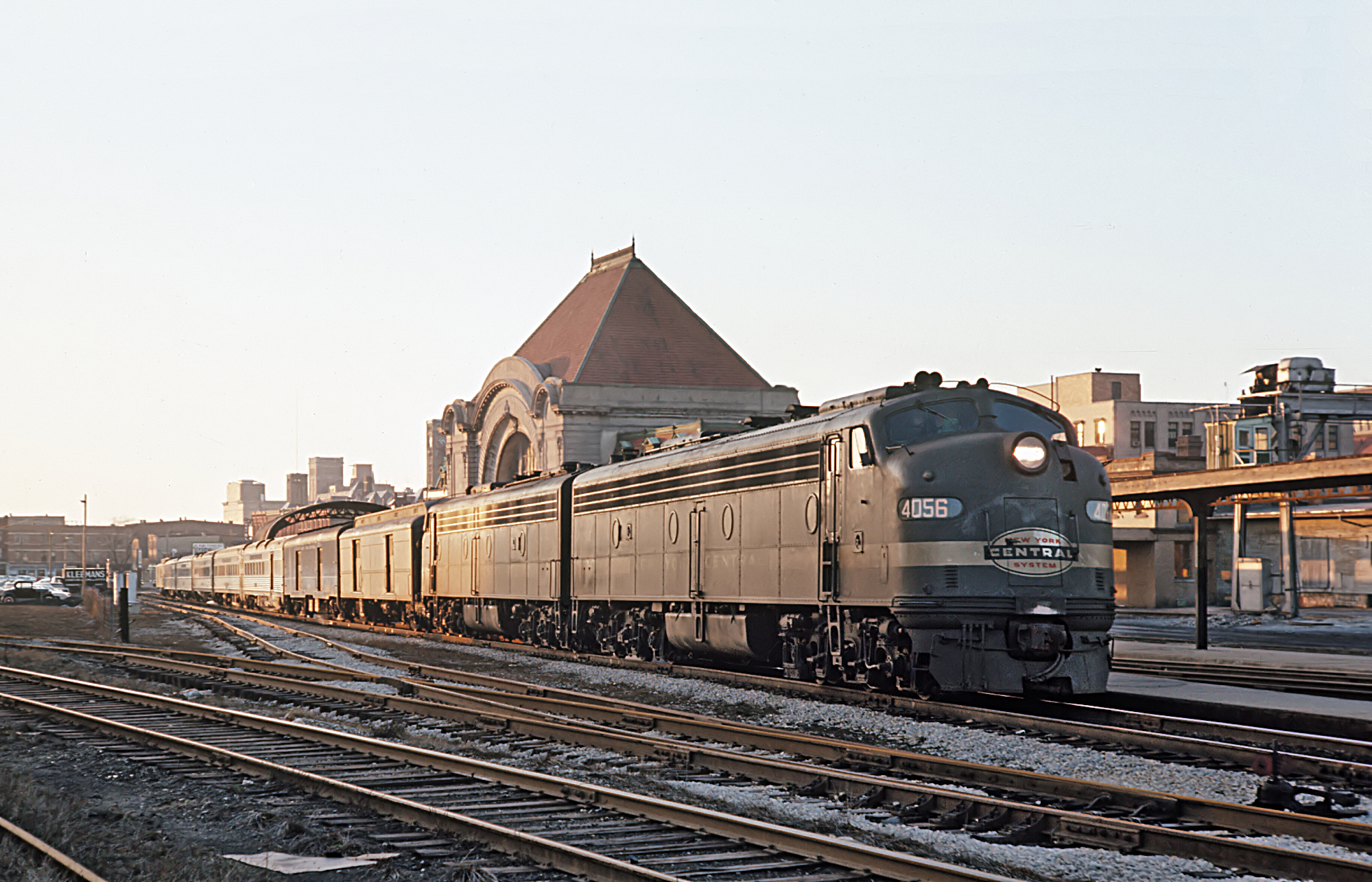
- Springfield station with the Ohio State Limited in 1965

General information
- Location: 202 Washington Street; Springfield, Ohio
- Coordinates: 39°55′18″N 83°48′25″W

History
- Closed: 30 April 1971

Former services
Preceding station	New York Central Railroad	Following station
Enon toward Cincinnati	Cincinnati – Cleveland	Plattsburg toward Cleveland
Enon toward Cincinnati	Cincinnati – Toledo	Glen Echo toward Toledo
Terminus	Springfield – Sandusky (Note: "Doodlebug" operation in the 1930s)	Glen Echo toward Sandusky (B4)
Terminus	Delaware Branch	Moorefield toward Delaware
Cold Springs toward Indianapolis	Indianapolis – Springfield	Terminus
Location

Springfield station was a passenger train station in Springfield, Ohio, built and operated by the Cleveland, Cincinnati, Chicago and St. Louis Railway, commonly referred to as the "Big Four Railroad." Construction on the station began on November 22, 1909, and it opened for service in 1911. The brick structure was located at Washington Street and Spring Street, east of the Big Four's previous station on the south side of Washington Street.

The Big Four had been acquired by the New York Central Railroad in 1906 but operated independently until it was fully absorbed into its parent railroad's operations in 1930. Many politicians, such as Richard Nixon in his 1968 presidential campaign, made campaign stops at the station.

== Passenger trains ==
In 1924, an average of 3,000 freight cars and 40 passenger and express trains passed through the depot each day. By 1926, the station was accommodating 26 passenger trains a day. Two years later, the depot was being used by 123,000 passengers.

In 1947, in the postwar period, the station remained busy, with New York Central trains bound in multiple directions:

- Cincinnati-Columbus-Cleveland route: the Cleveland Special, Midnight Special, New York Special (section connecting with main part of the New York-bound train in Cleveland), Ohio State Limited (bound for New York after Cleveland), Water Level Route (section connecting with main part of the New York-bound train in Cleveland), plus a six-day-a-week unnamed train and two daily unnamed trains on the same route.
- Cincinnati-Toledo-Detroit route: Michigan Special and a New York Central extension of the Ponce de Leon (Florida - Cincinnati)
- Indianapolis-Springfield route: local unnamed motor train service, six days a week

== Decline ==
The last trains on the Detroit-Cincinnati route, Michigan Special (northbound) and Ohio Special (southbound), made their final runs in 1958. In 1967, the Ohio State Limited had its final run, as did the Night Special, both on the Cincinnati-Cleveland route. The New York Central sustained a local unnamed remnant of the Ohio State Limited on the Cincinnati-Cleveland route. The Penn Central (formed from the New York Central-Pennsylvania Railroad merger) carried on this service in the final year of the station's existence.

The Big Four Depot was demolished in February 1969 to make way for the Spring Street bridge that carries State Route 72's bypass.

The Penn Central reduced trains for the final months of service through Springfield to a Cincinnati-Columbus train, as a feeder to a Columbus connection with the St. Louis-New York Spirit of St. Louis The last trains through Springfield ran on April 30, 1971.
