= Preservation Ohio =

U.S. nonprofit organization

Preservation Ohio is Ohio's oldest statewide historic preservation organization, and is presented by the Ohio Preservation Alliance, Inc.

In addition to this distinction, Preservation Ohio is also the only known, staffed statewide preservation organization in the United States not affiliated with the National Trust for Historic Preservation.

Ohio Preservation Alliance, Inc. was established in 1982 in Columbus. First known as the Ohio Preservation Alliance, the organization changed its operating name to Preservation Ohio in the Fall of 2005. Over the last 25 years, Preservation Ohio has been at the forefront of significant efforts to increase the scope and effectiveness of efforts to preserve the state's historic resources. In 1983, this included hosting the first statewide conference in Ohio on downtown revitalization. In the early 1990s, the organization sponsored some of the initial attempts to discuss the potential for sustainable and smart growth policies for the state.

Current programming includes the HometownOhio revitalization initiative, the Turner Institute for Historic Preservation, and several others. It also authors MyHometownOhio, the country's first comprehensive statewide online magazine for historic preservation, downtown and neighborhood revitalization, heritage tourism and sustainable growth.

Preservation Ohio is also the home of the List of Ohio's Most Endangered Historic Sites, issued annually or bi-annually since 1993.

== Sources ==
- Times Reporter.
- National Trust
- Toledo Blade
- Preservation Ohio online - https://preserveohio.com/
- MyHometownOhio - http://myhometownohio.blogharbor.com
