= Cincinnati Limited =

American named passenger train

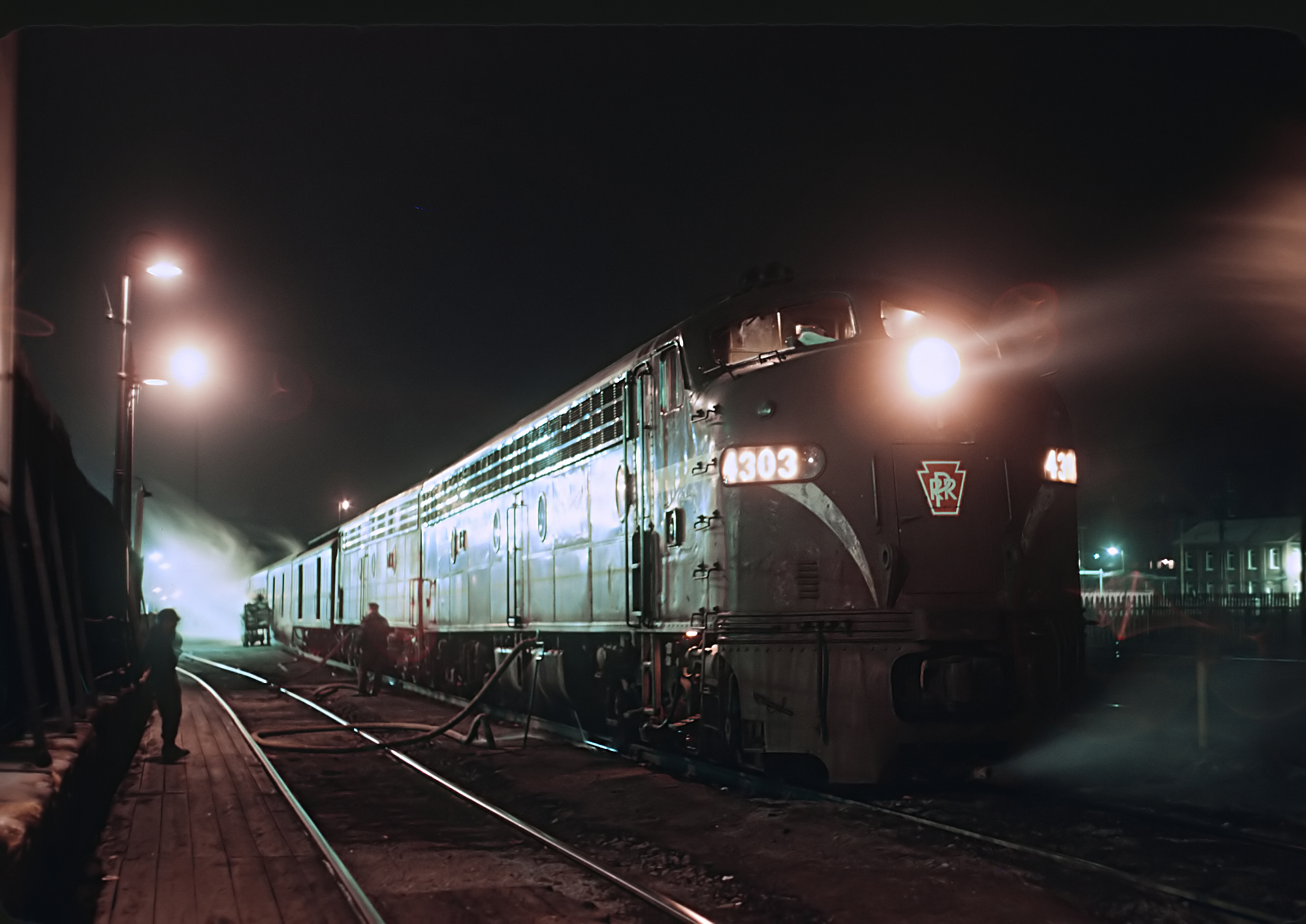
- The Cincinnati Limited at Altoona

Overview
- Service type: Inter-city rail
- Status: Discontinued
- Locale: Midwestern United States; Mid-Atlantic United States
- First service: 1920
- Last service: 1971
- Former operators: Pennsylvania Railroad; Penn Central (1968-1971)

Route
- Termini: New York, New York; Cincinnati, Ohio
- Distance travelled: 755.1 miles (1,215.2 km)
- Service frequency: Daily
- Train numbers: 41 (westbound); 40 (eastbound)

On-board services
- Seating arrangements: Reclining seat coaches
- Sleeping arrangements: Sections, Roomettes and double bedrooms (1954)
- Catering facilities: Dining car, Lounge car, Bar lounge car
- Observation facilities: Observation car

Technical
- Track gauge: 1,435 mm (4 ft 8 1/2 in)

The Cincinnati Limited was a named train of the Pennsylvania Railroad; the train traveled from New York City's Pennsylvania Station to the Cincinnati Union Terminal. It was a rival to New York Central's Ohio State Limited. The Cincinnati Limited carried connecting sleeping cars to the Louisville and Nashville Railroad's Cincinnati to New Orleans Pan American. By the mid-1950s, the sleeper extension on L&N lines ended at Memphis instead of New Orleans.

The train was sustained into the era of the Penn Central, the successor of the Pennsylvania Railroad. Both the Cincinnati Limited and the Pan American ended service on April 30, 1971, as passenger trains moved over to Amtrak.

== Stations west of Harrisburg ==
The train ran at limited stations from Pittsburgh to Columbus, in comparison to the PRR's Penn Texas which bypassed most of them.

- Lewistown station (westbound only)
- Altoona station
- Pittsburgh Union Station
- Steubenville (eastbound only)
- Columbus Union Station
- Xenia (westbound only)
- Norwood
- Winton Place
- Cincinnati Union Terminal
