= Capitol 400 =

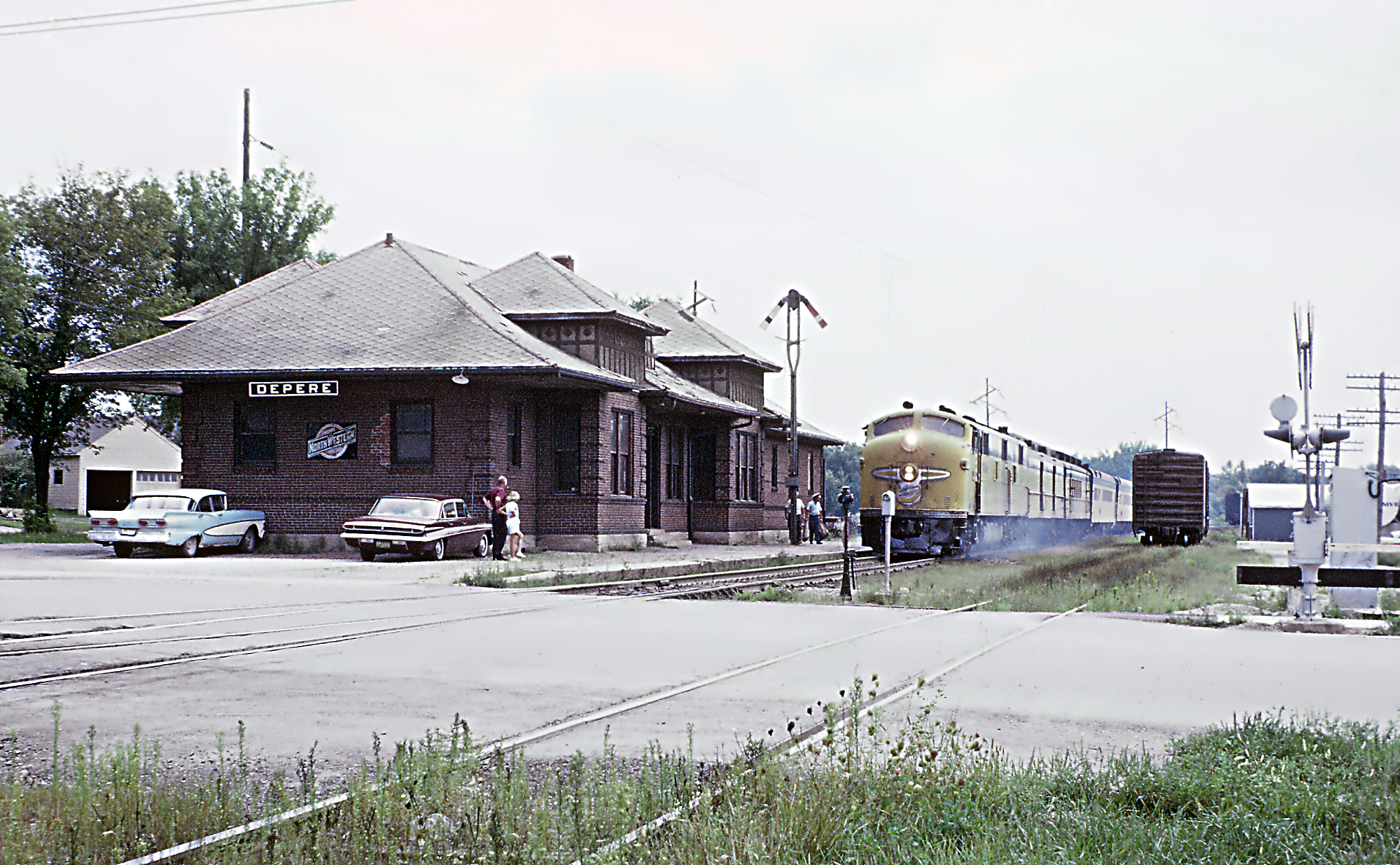
- The similarly equipped Commuter 400

Overview
- Service type: Inter-city rail
- Status: Discontinued
- Locale: Illinois and Wisconsin
- First service: 1942
- Last service: 1950
- Former operator: Chicago and North Western Railway

Route
- Termini: North Western Terminal, Chicago, Illinois; C&NW station, Madison, Wisconsin
- Service frequency: Daily except Sunday
- Train number: 155-609, 500

Technical
- Track gauge: 4 ft 8 1/2 in (1,435 mm) standard gauge

The Capitol 400 was a streamlined passenger train operated by the Chicago and North Western Railway between Chicago, Illinois and Madison, Wisconsin via Milwaukee, Wisconsin. From Madison it returned to Chicago via Janesville, Wisconsin. It operated from 1942 to 1950. It was one of the railroad's 400 passenger trains, whose name stemmed from the original '400-mile, 400-minute' express operated by the railroad between Chicago and Minneapolis–St. Paul.

== History ==
In January 1942, just after the entry of the United States into World War II, the Chicago and North Western received four new streamlined trainsets. One of these was used to re-equip the Minnesota 400 while another became the Peninsula 400. The two remaining sets were pooled to provide a variety of services between Chicago and various destinations in Wisconsin: Milwaukee (Commuter 400 and City of Milwaukee 400), Green Bay (Shoreland 400 and Valley 400) and finally Madison: the Capitol 400. Unusually, the Capitol 400 did not make a standard round-trip. Outbound it traveled via Milwaukee, while inbound it traveled via Janesville, Wisconsin.

In March 1950, the Capitol 400 (No. 155-609) departed Chicago at 1:30 PM, arriving in Milwaukee at 3:05 PM and Madison at 4:40 PM. The southbound train, No. 500, departed Madison at 5:00 PM, arriving in Janesville at 5:38 PM and Chicago at 7:30 PM. The train's consist included a tavern car, dining car, parlor car, and coaches. It did not operate on Sundays. On April 30, the North Western discontinued the Capitol 400, replacing it with the Dakota 400, which originated in Huron, South Dakota and operated to Chicago via Madison in both directions.
