= Southwestern Limited (New York Central train) =

American named passenger train (1889–1966)

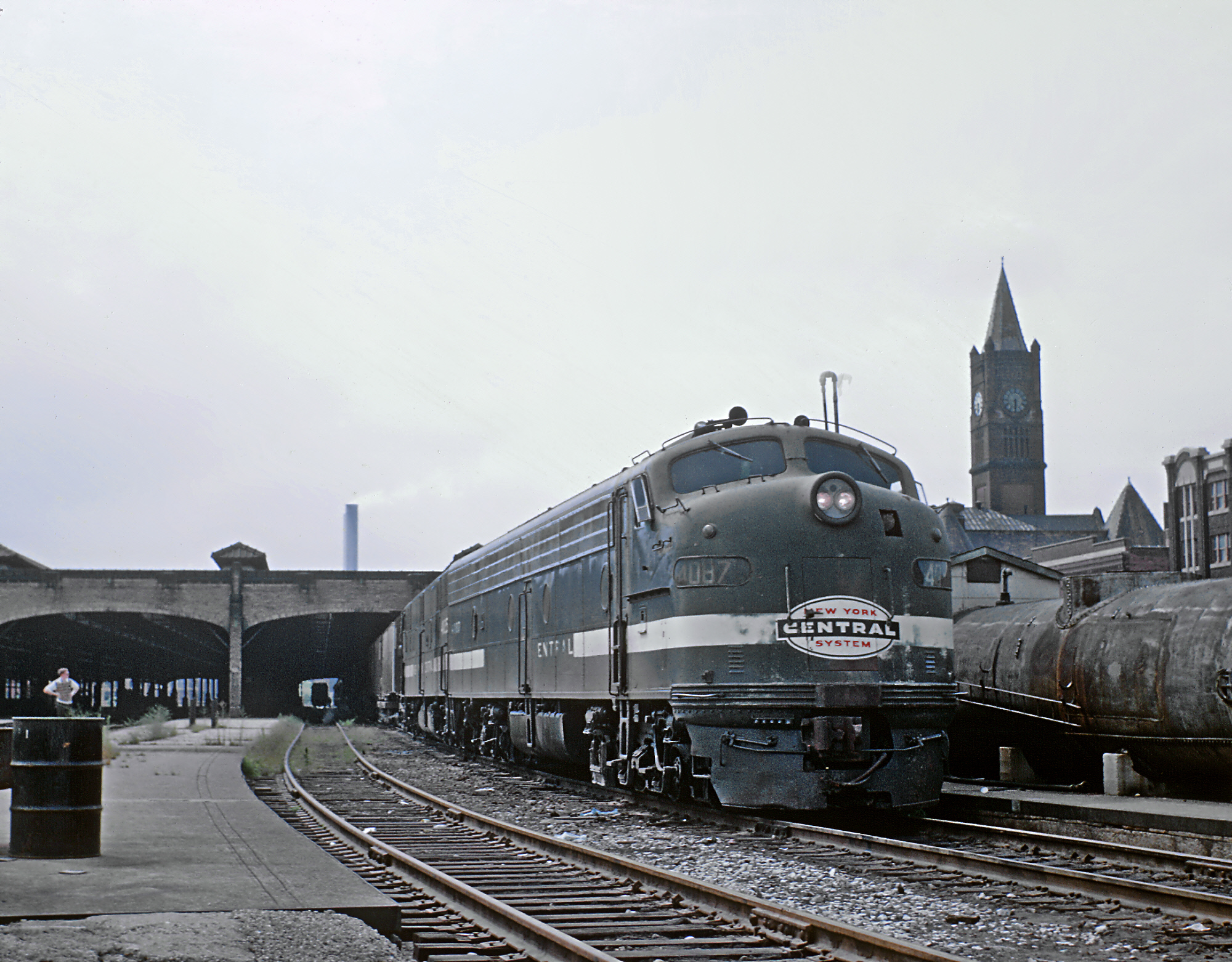
- The Southwestern Limited at Indianapolis Union Station

Overview
- Service type: Inter-city rail
- Status: Discontinued
- Locale: Northeastern United States - Midwestern United States
- First service: 1889
- Last service: October 30, 1966
- Current operator: New York Central Railroad

Route
- Termini: New York City; St. Louis
- Average journey time: 21 hours
- Service frequency: Daily
- Train numbers: Westbound: 11; Eastbound: 12
- Lines used: The Water Level Route and The Big Four Route

On-board services
- Seating arrangements: Reclining seat coaches, all seats reserved
- Sleeping arrangements: Roomettes and double bedrooms
- Catering facilities: Dining service
- Observation facilities: Lounge sleeping car

Technical
- Track gauge: 4 ft 8 1/2 in (1,435 mm)

Sample consist
1953
- Train: No. 11 New York – St. Louis
- One 6 Double Bedroom and Lounge (New York—St. Louis); Two 10-6 Sleeper (New York—St. Louis); One 10-6 sleeper and one 22 roomette sleeper (From Boston, added at Albany); 10-6 sleeper (New York—Toledo, Ohio); One 10-5 Pullman (Boston—Toronto); 10-6 sleeper (Richmond, Virginia—St. Louis; interchanged in Cincinnati with the C&O); Dining cars (New York—St. Louis); Coaches (New York—St. Louis)

The Southwestern Limited was a passenger train service operated by the New York Central Railroad between New York City and St. Louis, from 1889 to 1966. The Southwestern Limited was one of the New York Central's luxury passenger trains. This passenger train competed with the other major railroad in the northeast, the Pennsylvania Railroad, and its Blue Ribbon named passenger trains the St. Louisan, the Jeffersonian, the Penn Texas and the Spirit of St. Louis.

== History ==
The Southwestern Limited carried the train numbers 11 (westbound) and 12 (eastbound).

The train service was originally conceived to be the main New York Central route to the American Southwest and California via the St. Louis gateway. The New York Central had strong relationships with railroads in the US west.

The Southwestern Limited was all-Pullman equipped on April 26, 1925. By 1933, the train included coaches.

The Southwestern Limited was marketed in terms of comfort and service, with private sleeping compartments, valets for men and maids for the ladies, club cars, and business amenities such as stenographers and stock market reports on board. Business communications included telephone connections when stopped at stations in major cities and Western Union messengers at all stations. Up to 1956, the New York Central would advertise in beginning pages of its timetables that the Southwestern Limited afforded connections [with modest layover times] in St. Louis with Frisco Railway trains to Oklahoma (Meteor) and MKT (Texas Special) and Missouri Pacific trains to Texas (Texas Eagle).

In the early 1950s, despite investments in equipment modernization such as all-steel streamlined cars, ridership began to drop as passengers moved to airlines and personal cars for long-distance travel.

As of October, 1956, the train operated no farther east than Cleveland. In 1958, trains number 11 and 12 were dropped and replaced by 311 and 312. The Southwestern Limited struggled until the last run, on October 30, 1966.

== Route and equipment used ==
The westbound Southwestern Limited (NYC train 11 in daily service) began at New York Grand Central Terminal and traveled along the Hudson River to Albany (where it was joined by cars from Boston); then onward to Buffalo and Cleveland's Union Terminal. From Cleveland, the train ran on The Big Four Railroad trackage to Indianapolis's Union Station, and then terminated in St Louis.

During the heyday of passenger train travel in 1937, westbound train number 11 left Grand Central Terminal at 8 pm; passengers leaving from Boston departed at 5:30 pm to join the train at Albany at 10:50 PM. The train continued west and left Buffalo at 3:50 AM. At Cleveland, the schedule shows the train leaving NYC track and joining the Big Four route at 8:45 AM. Continuing westward into the central time zone, the train left Indianapolis at 12:03 PM and arrived in St Louis at 4:58 PM, about 22 hours after leaving New York.

The eastbound Southwestern Limited (NYC train 12 in daily service) followed the same route back to New York, leaving St. Louis at 9:25 AM, changing to NYC trackage at Cleveland by 8:50 PM eastern time and then to Albany by 5:15 AM, and arrived at New York Grand Central at 8:20 AM.

In the 1950s, the Southwestern Limited became fully-streamlined as part of the New York Central's modernized "Great Steel Fleet."

In fall, 1958, the NYC eliminated the westbound trip of the Southwestern Limited. Likewise, the company's Knickerbocker, which took the same itinerary, lost its eastbound trip (for the St. Louis-Indianapolis segment), and the Knickerbocker (#341) served as the westbound counterpart to the Southwestern Limited (#312).

== 1953 Crash ==
On March 27, 1953, at 10:02 PM, a four-train accident involving the Southwestern Limited occurred on the four-track mainline 2.4 miles east of Conneaut, Ohio.

== Legacy ==
Before the coming of the 20th Century Limited, the Southwestern Limited was the New York Central's premier long-distance train.

As a competitor to the Pennsylvania Railroad's trains that ran between New York and St. Louis such as the Spirit of St. Louis, the New York Central's Southwestern Limited was disadvantaged by a less-direct route. The Pennsylvania competitors took about two fewer hours for the trip each way. Despite this, the Southwestern Limited remained on the New York Central timetable until only two years prior to the demise of the company, in 1968.
