= Cleveland, Cincinnati, Chicago and St. Louis Railway =

Railroad in the Midwestern US (1889–1930)

Overview
- Headquarters: Indianapolis, Indiana
- Locale: Illinois, Indiana, Michigan, and Ohio
- Dates of operation: 1889–1930
- Successor: New York Central

Technical
- Track gauge: 4 ft 8 1/2 in (1,435 mm) standard gauge

The Cleveland, Cincinnati, Chicago and St. Louis Railway, also known as the Big Four Railroad and commonly abbreviated CCC&StL, was a railroad company in the Midwestern United States. It operated in affiliation with the New York Central system.

Its primary routes were in Illinois, Indiana, Michigan, and Ohio. At the end of 1925 it reported 2,391 route-miles and 4,608 track-miles; that year it carried 8180 million net ton-miles of revenue freight and 488 million passenger-miles.

== History ==
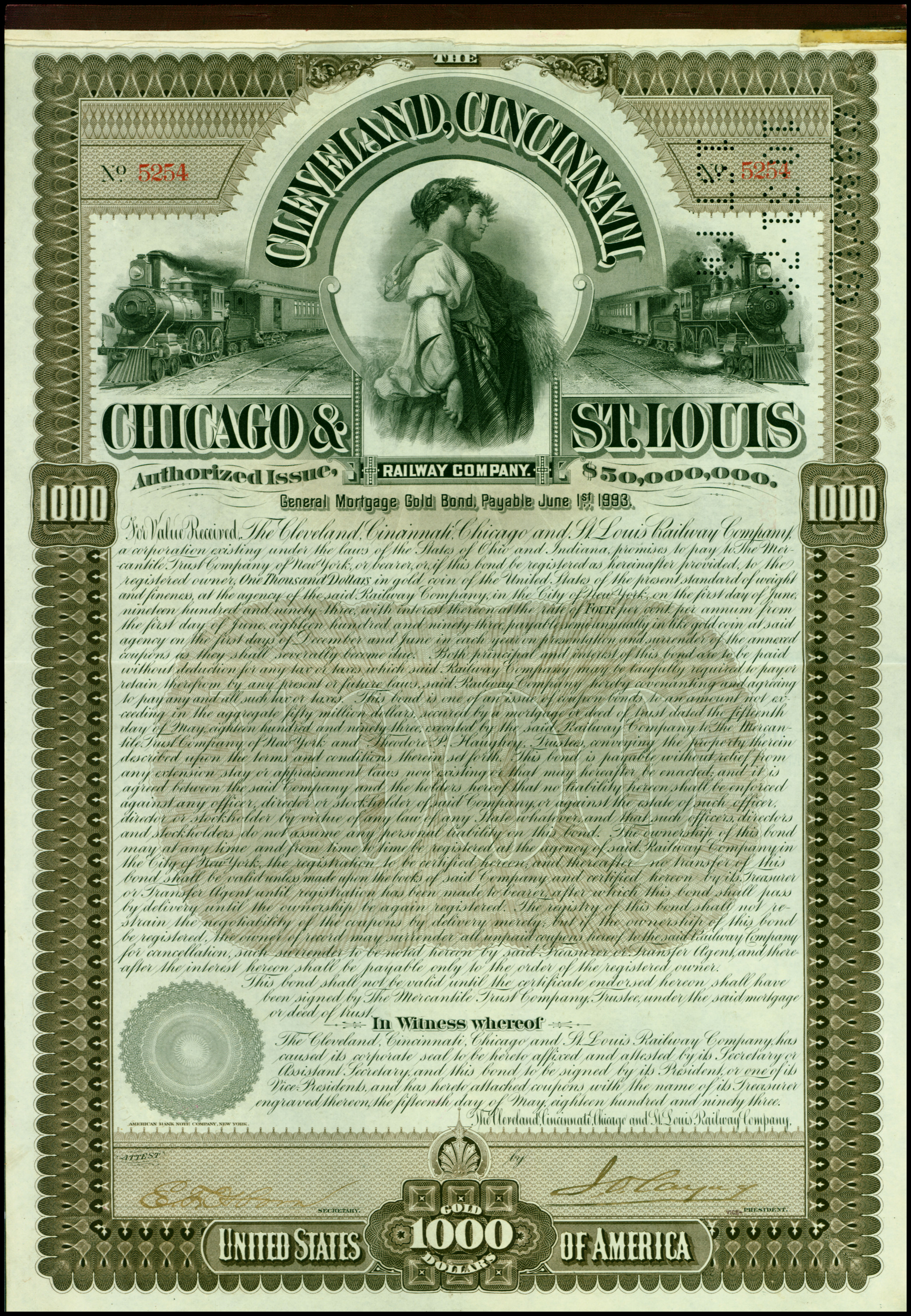
Gold Bond of the Cleveland, Cincinnati, Chicago and St. Louis Railway Company, issued 15. May 1893

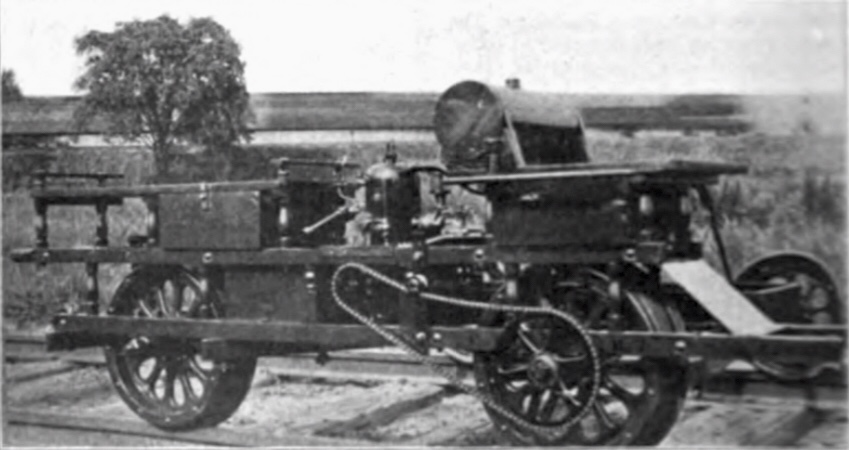
Railcar (draisine) in service of the Cleveland, Cincinnati, Chicago and St. Louis Railway 1912

The railroad was formed on June 30, 1889, by the merger of the Cleveland, Columbus, Cincinnati and Indianapolis Railway, the Cincinnati, Indianapolis, St. Louis and Chicago Railway and the Indianapolis & St. Louis Railway. The following year, the company gained control of the former Indiana, Bloomington and Western Railway (through the foreclosed Ohio, Indiana and Western Railway and through an operating agreement with the Peoria and Eastern Railway).

In 1906, the Big Four was acquired by the New York Central Railroad, which operated it as a separate entity until around 1930. The Big Four's lines were later incorporated into Penn Central in 1968 with the merger of New York Central and the Pennsylvania Railroad. Penn Central declared bankruptcy in 1970, and in 1976 many of Big Four's lines were included in the government-sponsored Conrail. Conrail was privatized in 1987 and in 1997 was jointly acquired by CSX and Norfolk Southern.

== Notable facilities ==
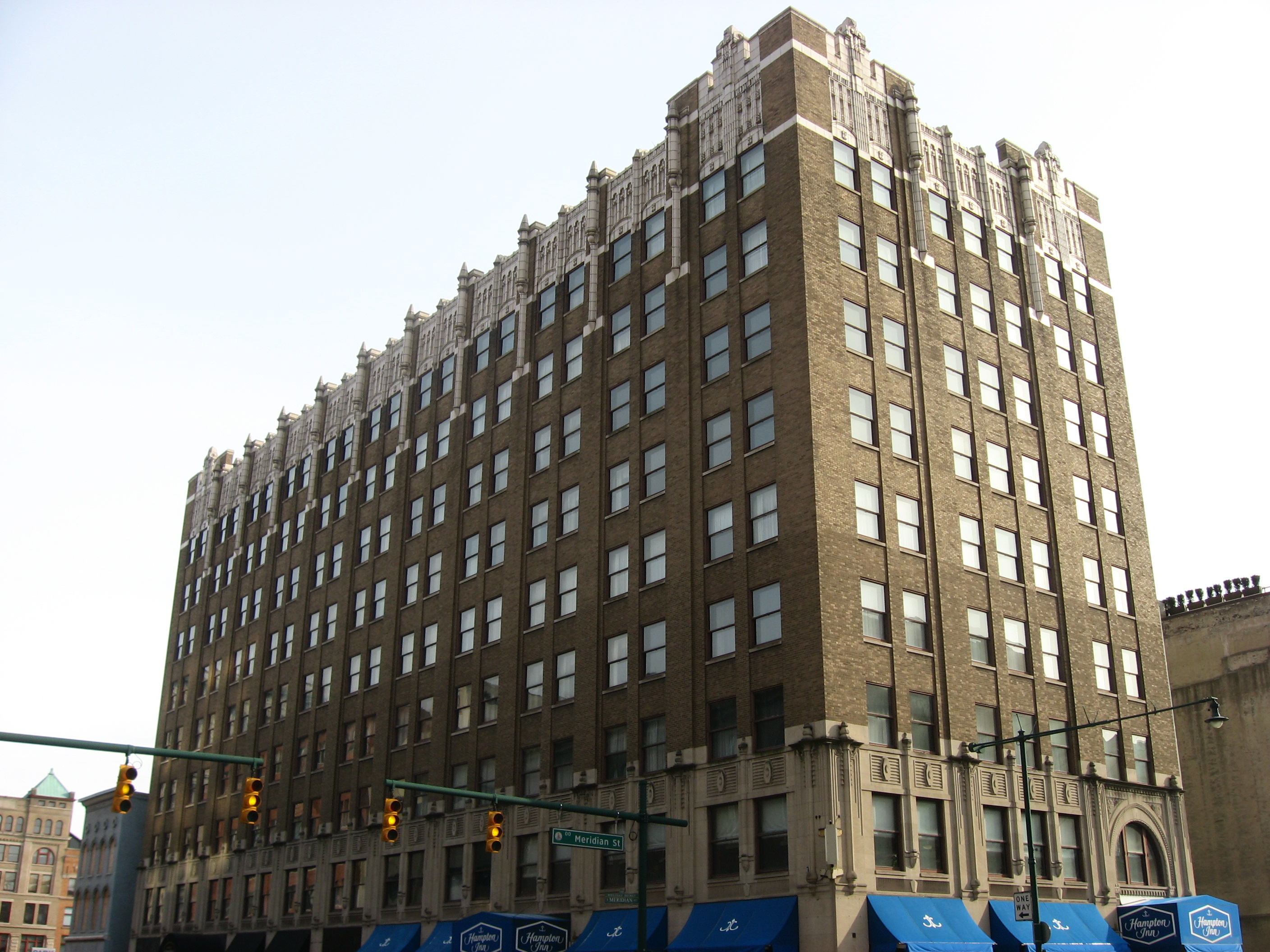
The Chesapeake Building, former headquarters of the Big Four

The railroad was headquartered in Indianapolis, Indiana, in the Chesapeake Building at 105 South Meridian Street. The building was constructed for the railroad in 1929 and was also known as the Big Four Building. In 1996, this multi-story structure became a Hampton Inn hotel.

Between 1904 and 1908 the railroad constructed a repair shop for steam locomotives and for passenger and freight cars in Beech Grove, Indiana. Amtrak purchased the facility, now known as the Beech Grove Shops, from the bankrupt Penn Central in 1975.

The railroad operated a terminal at Bellefontaine, Ohio, that included the largest roundhouse in use at that time between New York City and St. Louis, Missouri. Conrail closed the Bellefontaine terminal in 1983, and its roundhouse was dismantled.

A large yard facility known as the Big Four Yards is located in Avon, Indiana, along the line's tracks, now owned and operated by CSX.

The former locomotive shops complex in Mount Carmel, Illinois still stands, now occupied by Pacific Press Technologies.

In 1895, the railroad acquired what became known as the Big Four Bridge across the Ohio River at Louisville, Kentucky, thereby giving it access to that city. Use of the bridge for railroad purposes ceased by 1968, and it sat abandoned until work began by 2006 to convert it to use by pedestrians and bicyclists.

== See also ==
- Purdue Wreck — 1903 train collision
