= Jacob Bosiokovic =

American baseball player (born 1993)

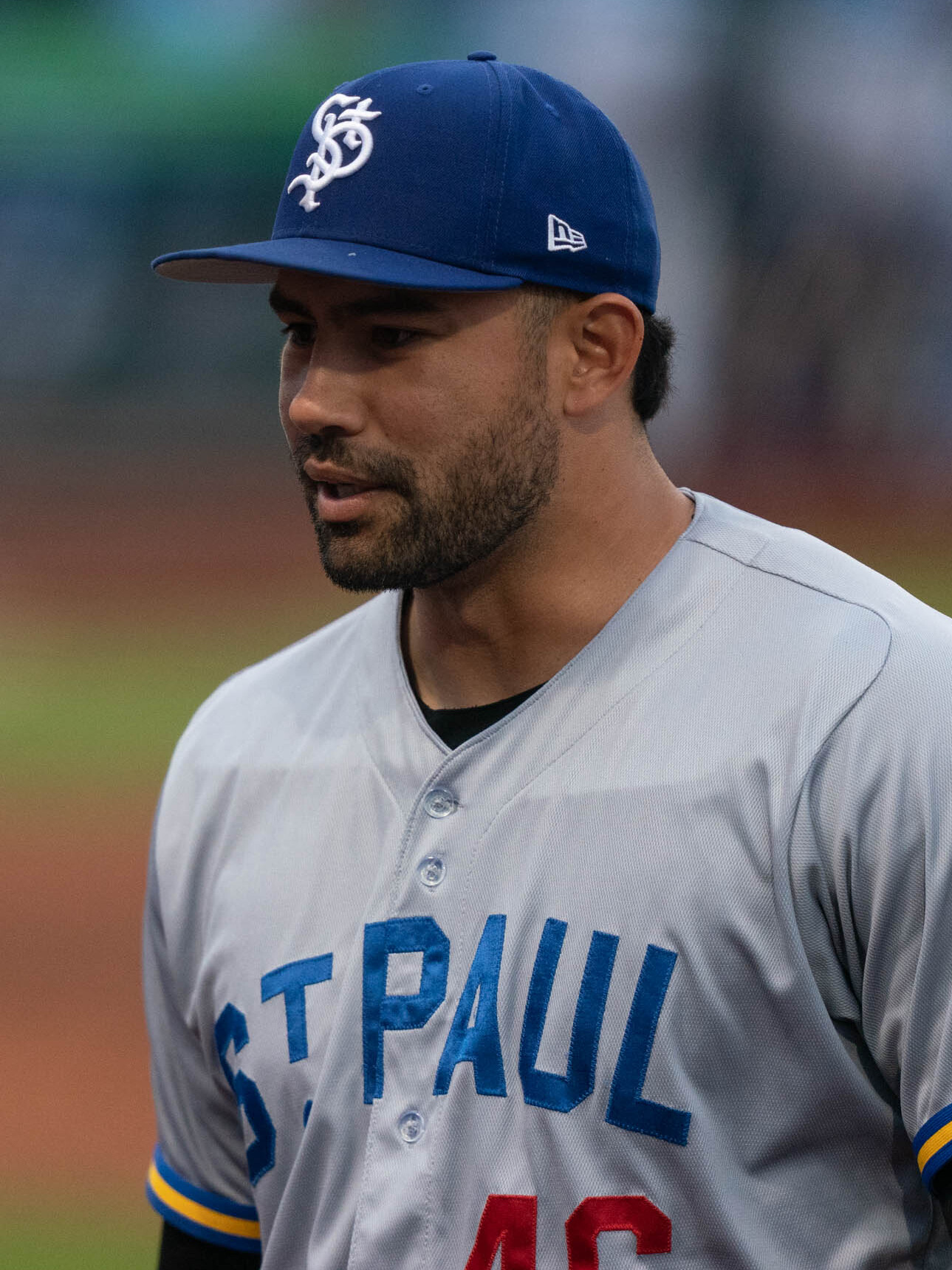
- Bosiokovic with the St. Paul Saints in 2025

Free agent
- Pitcher
- Born: December 21, 1993 (age 32); Delaware, Ohio, U.S.
- Bats: Right Throws: Right
- Stats at Baseball Reference

Jacob Bosiokovic (born December 21, 1993) is an American professional baseball pitcher who is a free agent. He is currently a phantom ballplayer, having spent five days on the St. Louis Cardinals' active roster without making an appearance.

== Career ==
Bosiokovic graduated from Rutherford B. Hayes High School in Delaware, Ohio, in 2012. Though the Ohio High School Baseball Coaches Association named him their Division I baseball player of the year for two consecutive years, he went unselected in the 2012 MLB draft and enrolled at Ohio State University to play college baseball for the Ohio State Buckeyes.

=== Colorado Rockies ===
The Colorado Rockies drafted Bosiokovic in the 19th round, with the 560th overall selection, of the 2016 Major League Baseball draft. He made his professional debut with the Low–A Boise Hawks, hitting .274 in 68 games.

Bosiokovic spent the 2017 season with the Single–A Asheville Tourists, hitting .246/.299/.466 with 15 home runs, 54 RBI, and 16 stolen bases. He spent the 2018 campaign with the High–A Lancaster JetHawks, playing in 42 games and batting .159/.247/.245 with four home runs, 17 RBI, and six stolen bases.

Following the 2018 season, Bosiokovic was converted into a pitcher. He made 33 appearances for Single–A Asheville in 2019, recording a 4.54 ERA with 42 strikeouts across 41 2/3 innings pitched.

=== St. Louis Cardinals ===
On December 12, 2019, Bosiokovic was selected by the St. Louis Cardinals in the minor league phase of the Rule 5 draft. He did not play in a game in 2020 due to the cancellation of the minor league season because of the COVID-19 pandemic.

Bosiokovic split 2021 between the Double–A Springfield Cardinals and Triple–A Memphis Redbirds. In 38 games for the two affiliates, he accumulated a 7–3 record and 3.97 ERA with 82 strikeouts and 7 saves. Bosiokovic returned to Memphis in 2022, making 15 relief appearances and posting a 5.27 ERA with 13 strikeouts and 3 saves across 13 2/3 innings of work. He elected free agency following the season on November 10, 2022.

=== Charleston Dirty Birds ===
On April 13, 2023, Bosiokovic signed with the Charleston Dirty Birds of the Atlantic League of Professional Baseball. In 44 games for the Dirty Birds, he compiled a 4–4 record and 3.35 ERA with 58 strikeouts across 43 innings. Bosiokovic became a free agent following the season.

=== St. Louis Cardinals (second stint) ===
On February 9, 2024, Bosiokovic signed a minor league contract to return to the St. Louis Cardinals organization. He began the year with the Triple–A Memphis Redbirds, and recorded a 3.00 ERA with 38 strikeouts in 25 games. On June 30, 2024, Bosiokovic was selected to the 40-man roster and promoted to the major leagues for the first time. He went unused out of the bullpen and was optioned back to Memphis on July 5, becoming a phantom ballplayer. Bosiokovic was designated for assignment following the promotion of Michael McGreevy on July 31. He cleared waivers and was sent outright to Memphis on August 2. Bosiokovic was released by the Cardinals organization on September 26.

=== Minnesota Twins ===
On January 17, 2025, Bosiokovic signed a minor league contract with the Minnesota Twins. In 19 appearances for the Triple-A St. Paul Saints, he struggled to an 0–3 record and 7.66 ERA with 26 strikeouts across 22 1/3 innings pitched. On June 15, Bosiokovic was released by the Twins organization.

== See also ==
- Rule 5 draft results
