= Rutherford B. Hayes High School =

Location
- 289 Euclid Avenue; Delaware, Delaware County, Ohio 43015; United States; 40°18′38″N 83°4′48″W

Information
- Type: Public high school
- Motto: Achieving Excellence, Honoring Tradition
- Established: 1962
- School district: Delaware City Schools
- Superintendent: Keith Pomeroy
- Principal: Dr. Jake Shafer
- Teaching staff: 83.30 (FTE)
- Grades: 9-12
- Enrollment: 1601
- Average class size: 400
- Student to teacher ratio: 19.35
- Hours in school day: 7.1
- Colors: Orange and Black
- Fight song: Stand Up and Cheer
- Athletics conference: Ohio Capital Conference
- Mascot: The Pacer
- Nickname: Delaware Hayes, Hayes High, Hayes
- Team name: Pacers
- Rival: Buckeye Valley High School
- Accreditation: North Central Association of Colleges and Schools
- Newspaper: The Talisman
- Yearbook: DelHi
- Website: hayes.dcs.k12.oh.us

Rutherford B. Hayes High School is a public high school in Delaware, Ohio, United States. It is the only high school in the Delaware City School District. The school's mascot is the Pacer, a tribute to the Little Brown Jug, which takes place in Delaware. The school is named after President Rutherford B. Hayes, who was born in Delaware in 1822.

== Music program ==
Hayes has an active music department. The Hayes orchestra performed at Carnegie Hall in March 2010 and again in 2014 and has received superior ratings at State competitions for many consecutive years. In 2017 the marching band went to Ireland to perform at a Saint Patrick's Day Parade.

The Delaware Hayes Grand Pacer Marching Band qualified for State in the Ohio Music Education Association (OMEA) competition in 2010 and performed at the Outback Bowl in December 2011 and January 2020. The marching band also went on to qualify for State Competition at all three contests in 2012. It received a superior rating of 1 at qualifying contests and the State Finals, and has qualified for OMEA State Competition every year since 2012. The Marching band then again in 2017 earned a 1 at State competition, performing their show "Lost In The Woods". The marching band also earned a 1 at OMEA state competition, performing their show "Oddly Enough" and "Villains". The marching band also earned a 1 at the OMEA state competition, performing their show "One Giant Leap" in 2023. In 2024, the marching band qualified for OMEA State Finals and received an excellent rating with their show "The Girl In Red". Likewise, the marching band also received an excellent rating at OMEA State Finals in 2025 with the show "What's Opera Doc?". In 2026, the marching band received a superior (1) score and qualified for OMEA State Finals with their show "Roll for Initiative" on the first week of OMEA competitions. The marching band has performed at the Ohio State Buckeye Invititational in 2024, 2025, and is slated to perform in 2026. They have also performed at The Ohio State Skull Session in 2019 and 2026.

The Color Guard also went undefeated in their seasons in 2012.

The Concert band qualified for the Ohio Music Education Association State competition after receiving straight superior ratings at district competition in 2011. Both the marching and concert band received an Excellent rating at the Ohio Music Education Association State competition in 2010–2011. In 2026, the concert band received straight superior ratings at OMEA District Large Group to qualify for OMEA State Large Group. At State Large Group, the concert band received their first ever superior ratings at State Large Group.

The Hayes Symphonic Choir performed in New York City with Eric Whitacre in April 2011 and received many superior ratings at the District and State levels along with Women's Chorale. The Symphonic Choir also performed at Carnegie Hall in New York City in 2026.

Hayes has an active Tri-M Music Honor Society chapter who also implements a plastic recycling project. Hayes has many music students that are members of honors groups like the Ohio Capital Conference Honor Choir, East Central Regional Orchestra, Muskingum University Youthfest, OMEA District 10 Honors Band, Columbus Symphony Youth Orchestra, Columbus Symphony Cadet Orchestra, Ohio University Honor Choir and Orchestra, Youth Philharmonic of Central Ohio, Ohio State Orchestra, Central Ohio Symphony Young Strings, and the Ohio Wesleyan University President's High School Music Festival.

== Athletics ==
Delaware Hayes is a member of the Ohio High School Athletic Association (Division 1 for most sports) and part of the Ohio Capital Conference's Capital Division.

=== State championships ===
- Boys' Lacrosse (Club Division) - 2012, 2013
- Swim and Dive- 2022, 2023

== Notable alumni ==
- Jacob Bosiokovic, Baseball player
- Sam Sulek, YouTuber, professional bodybuilder, and fitness influencer
