= Lexington Union Station =

Coordinates: 38°02′43″N 84°29′46″W

Lexington Union Station was a union station, serving most of the railroads passing through Lexington, Kentucky. Located on Main Street, just west of Walnut Street (now, Martin Luther King Boulevard) it served the Chesapeake and Ohio Railway and the Louisville and Nashville Railroad from 1907 to 1957.

== History ==
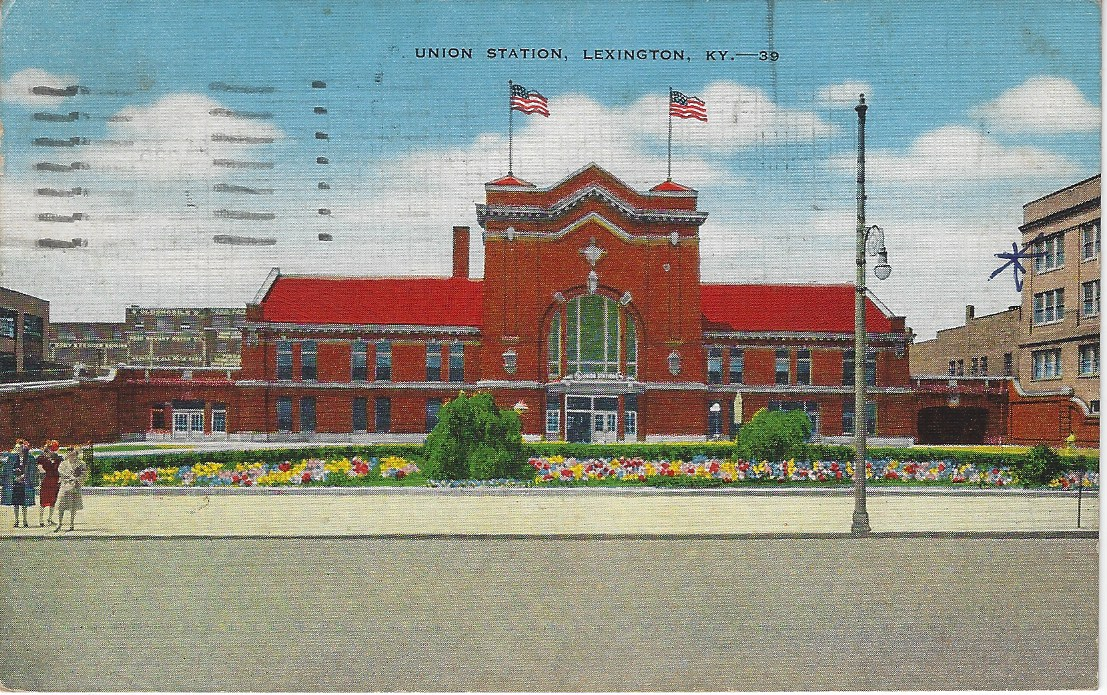
Union Station, early 20th century

The horse-breeding history was well-established in central Kentucky by the mid-19th century, particularly in Lexington. By the turn of the 19th century to the 20th, the city was seen as important enough to have Pullman cars carrying sleeping car passengers to eastern cities.

From the 1880s, the railroads serving Lexington had talked about constructing a union station on Main Street to serve every passenger train in the city. The railroads were faced by a challenge in finding suitable land large enough for a downtown terminal. In 1901, the Chesapeake and Ohio, the Lexington and Eastern Railway and the Louisville and Nashville decided to build a station. The Southern Railway decided not to join the other railroads, and instead continued to use its station on South Broadway.

Union Station opened on August 4, 1907. The first train was a Chesapeake and Ohio passenger train, met by an estimated crowd 3,000 onlookers. Union Station's exterior was built with red and yellow brick, and with green and red glass. The lobby was in the center rotunda, which was 50 by 80 feet, with a central dome 50 feet high. The lobby had a Roman arch ceiling and six oak waiting benches.

The station served C&O and L&N trains on competing routes west to Louisville Central Station. The L&N trains made a stop at the state's capital, Frankfort, on the route westward to Louisville Union Station. To the east, C&O trains continued east to Ashland, Kentucky, and further east to Newport News, Virginia and to Washington, D.C. The C&O trains, also stopping in Frankfort, included Louisville-Ashland sections of the company's George Washington and Sportsman. L&N offered day and overnight trains traveling east to Winchester, then to Fleming in southeastern Kentucky. However, the stops in Winchester were not conveniently matched with the L&N's long-distance trains between Cincinnati and Florida which also stopped in Winchester.

== Demise ==
By the latter 1950s passenger traffic and high overhead costs led the tenant railroads to abandon the station. The Louisville & Nashville operations were at a comparative disadvantage to the Southern Railway, which offered direct rail service to Cincinnati. The L&N required a transfer in Winchester. The Louisville & Nashville ended its last remaining passenger service from the station, its Lexington-Winchester-Hazard (shortened from its earlier Lexington-Fleming route) train between 1955 and 1956. In the same period, the C&O reduced its departures down to just the #21 Ashland-Lexington-Louisville and #22 Louisville-Lexington-Ashland trains serving the George Washington.

The final passenger train was the C&O's George Washington on May 9, 1957. In March 1960 the station was demolished. In its place the Lexington Police Department and the Fayette County clerk's office were constructed, as well as the downtown's busiest parking garage, the Annex Garage.

However, C&O passenger trains persisted in Lexington beyond the closing of the station. The George Washington made stops in Lexington until 1971.

Preceding station	Chesapeake and Ohio Railway	Following station
Frankfort toward Louisville	Louisville – Ashland	Chilesburg toward Ashland
Preceding station	Louisville and Nashville Railroad	Following station
Midway toward Anchorage	Anchorage -Maysville	Muir toward Maysville
