= Spring Street Freight House =

- U.S. National Register of Historic Places
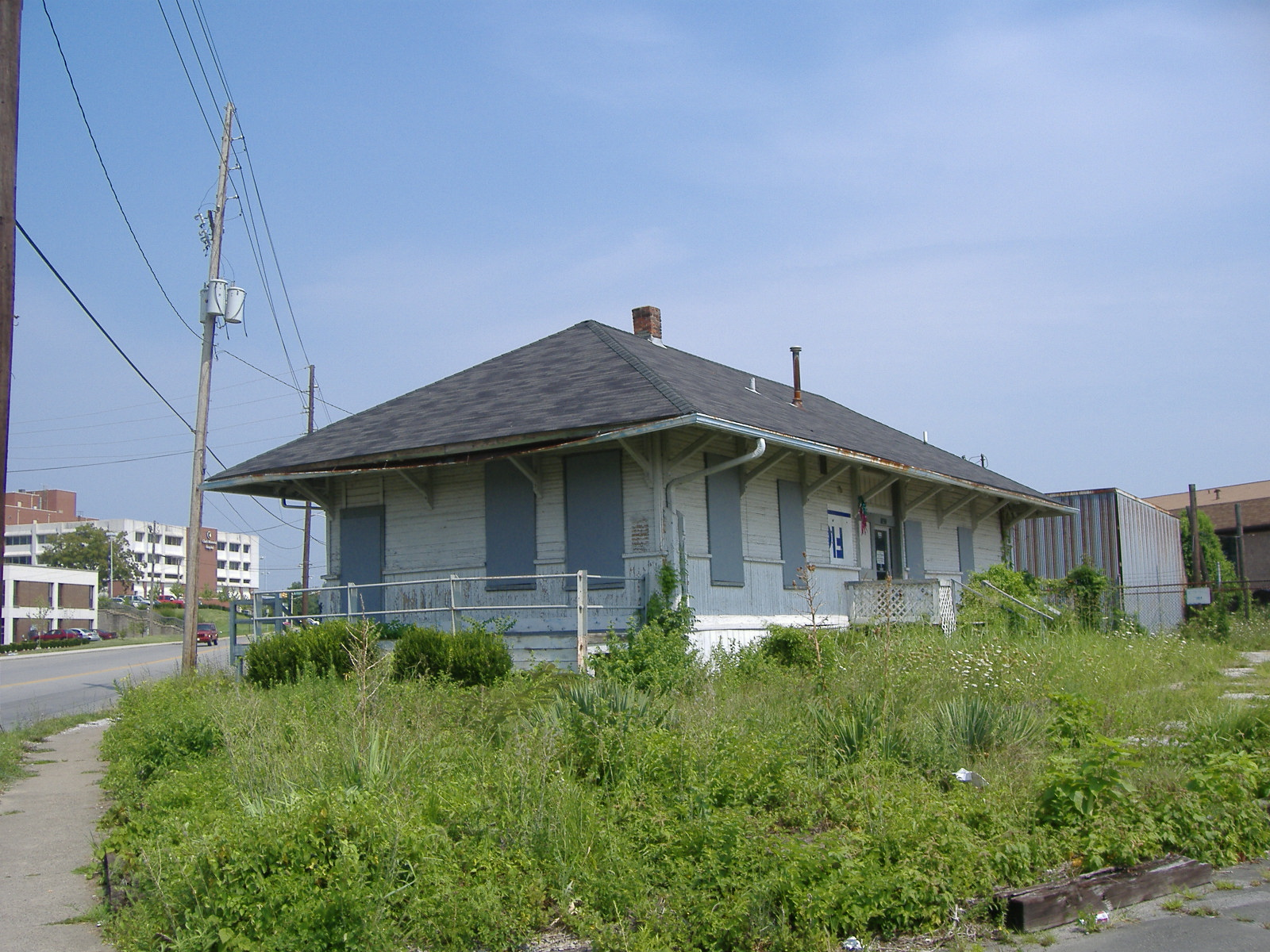

- Location within Clark County, Indiana Location within Indiana Location within the United States
- Location: 1030 Spring St., Jeffersonville, Indiana
- Coordinates: 38°16′49″N 85°44′49″W
- Area: less than one acre
- Built: 1925
- Built by: Cleveland, Cincinnati, Chicago and St. Louis Railway
- Architectural style: Bungalow/American Craftsman
- NRHP reference No.: 07000209
- Added to NRHP: March 29, 2007

The Spring Street Freight House is a historic freight house located at Jeffersonville, Indiana. It was placed on the National Register of Historic Places in May 2007, after being nominated by the Indiana Department of Transportation. It is one of the few railhouses built in the 1920s still standing.

It was built by Cleveland, Cincinnati, Chicago and St. Louis Railway (CCC & St. L RR), also known as the Big Four, around 1925. It was built Craftsman-style, and is 1 1/2 stories high. Its foundation and walls are made of wood, and the roof is asphalt shingles. It includes a brick chimney. The property upon which the freight house is situated covers 0.52 acres (2,100 m^{2}).

After the railroad abandoned it in 1963, R.A. Alms & Sons Feed Wholesalers used it from 1970 to 1975. In the 1980s a cable company used it. It is currently unused, but the Ohio River Bridges Project had plans to restore it in 2008 and turn it into its headquarters; as of August 2009 nothing, no renovation had been performed.

The State of Indiana and Indiana Department of Transportation completed an extensive rehabilitation of the building in 2012.

It was placed on the Indiana Register of Historic Sites and Structures and the National Register of Historic Places on March 29, 2007.

== Gallery ==
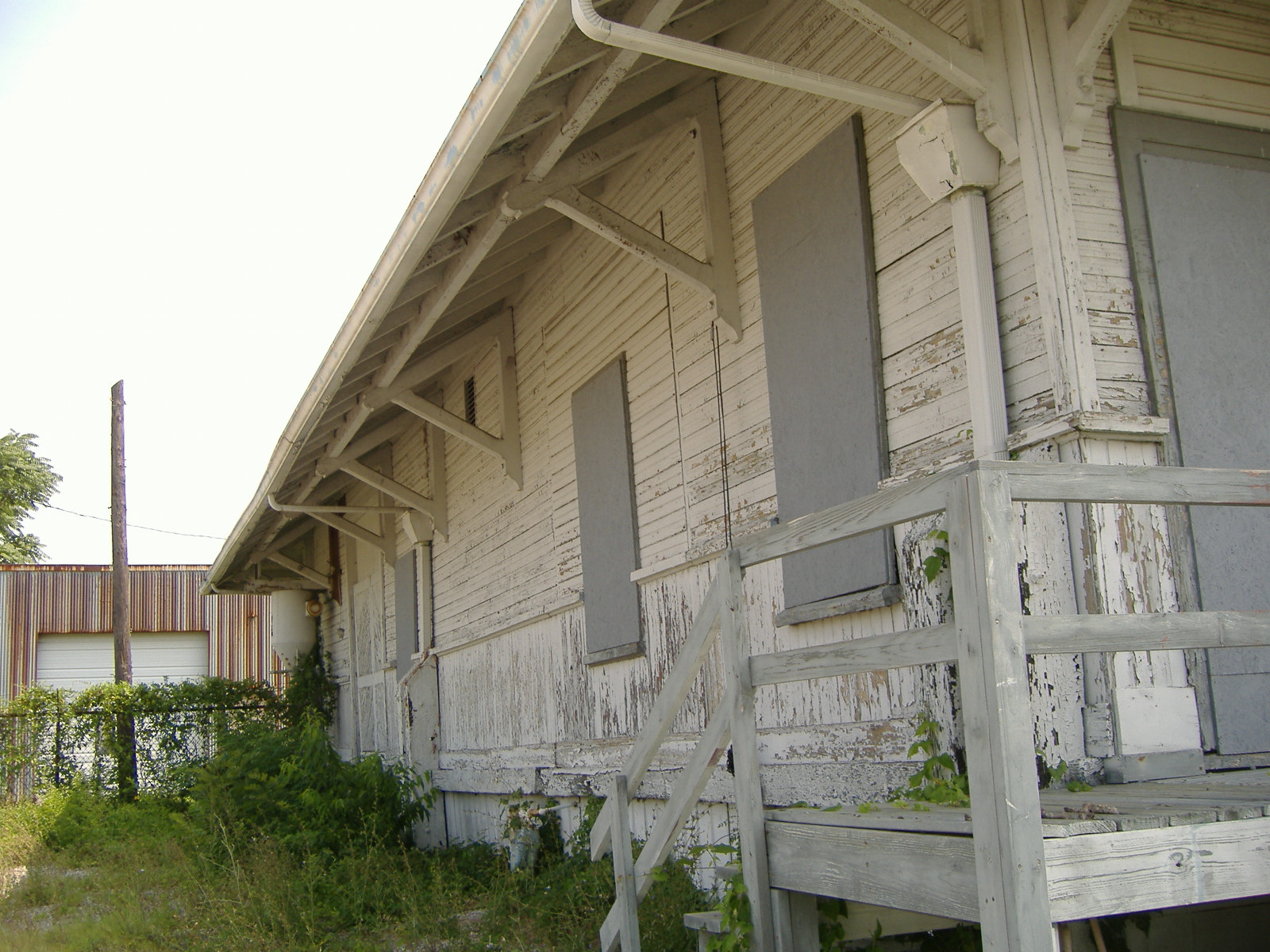
North side of Depot, before restoration

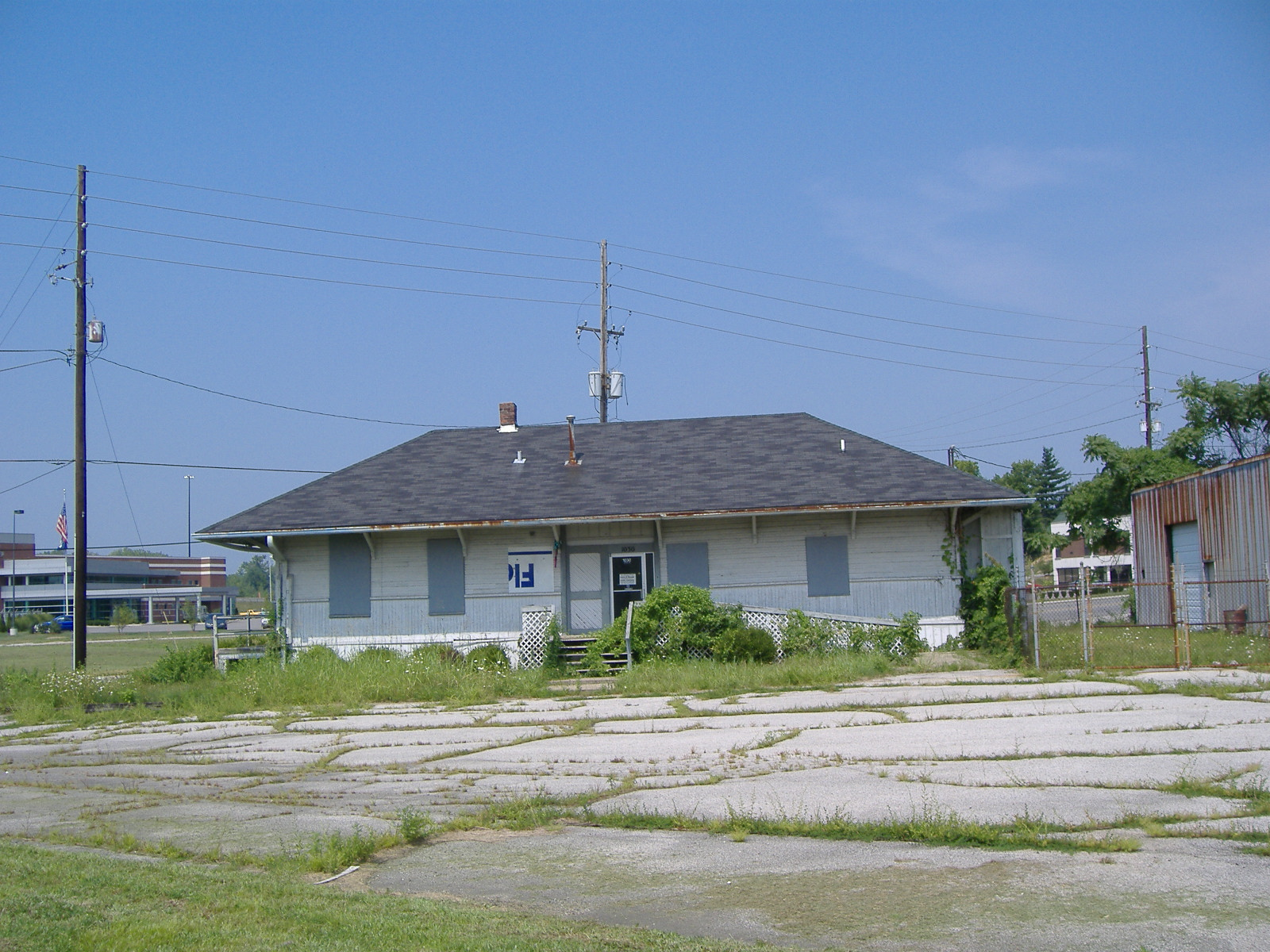
Front of depot, before restoration. Sign in door states that the depot is owned by the state of Indiana, and that trespassers will be prosecuted.

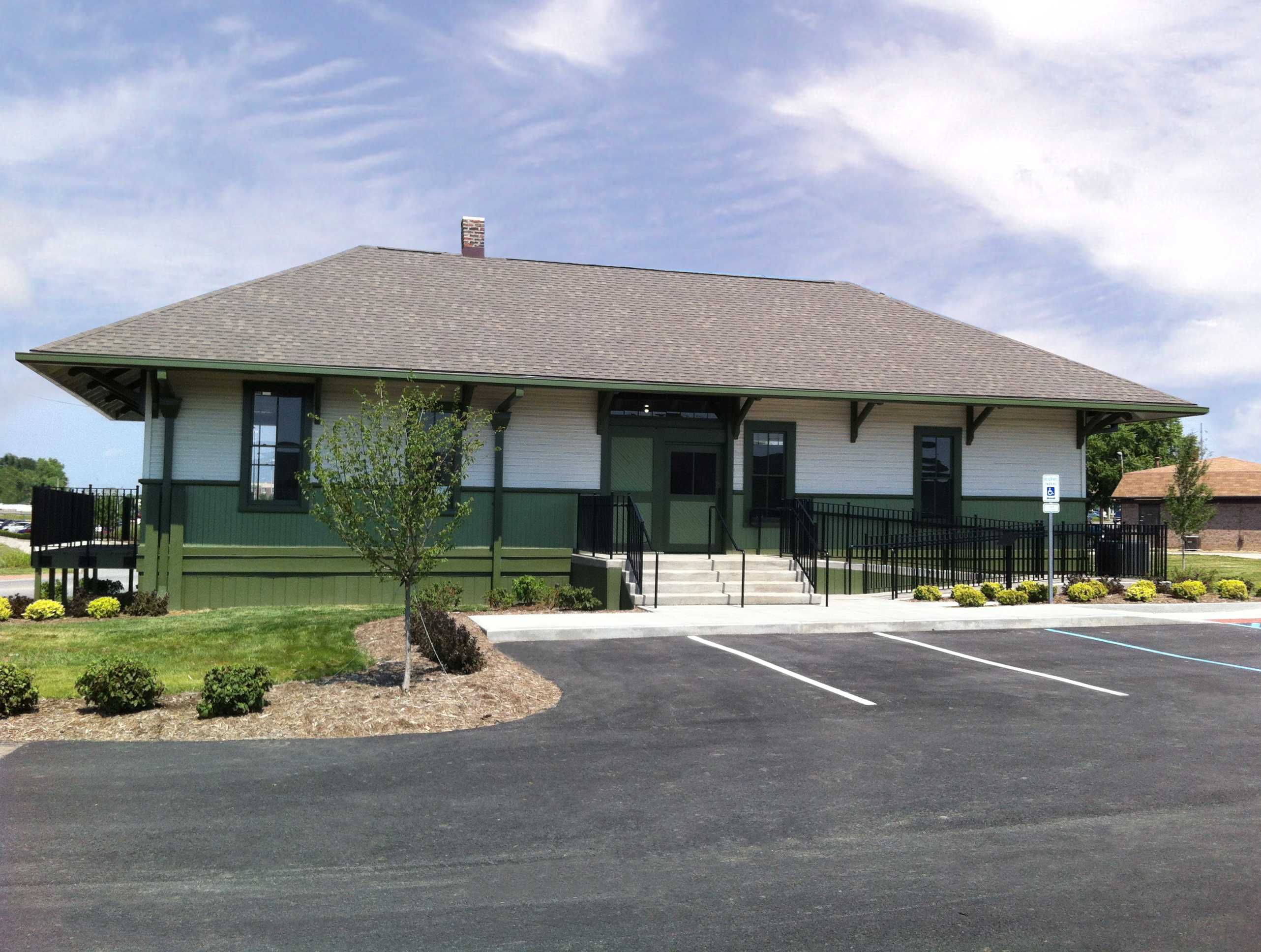
Rehabilitated (2012) - South Entrance

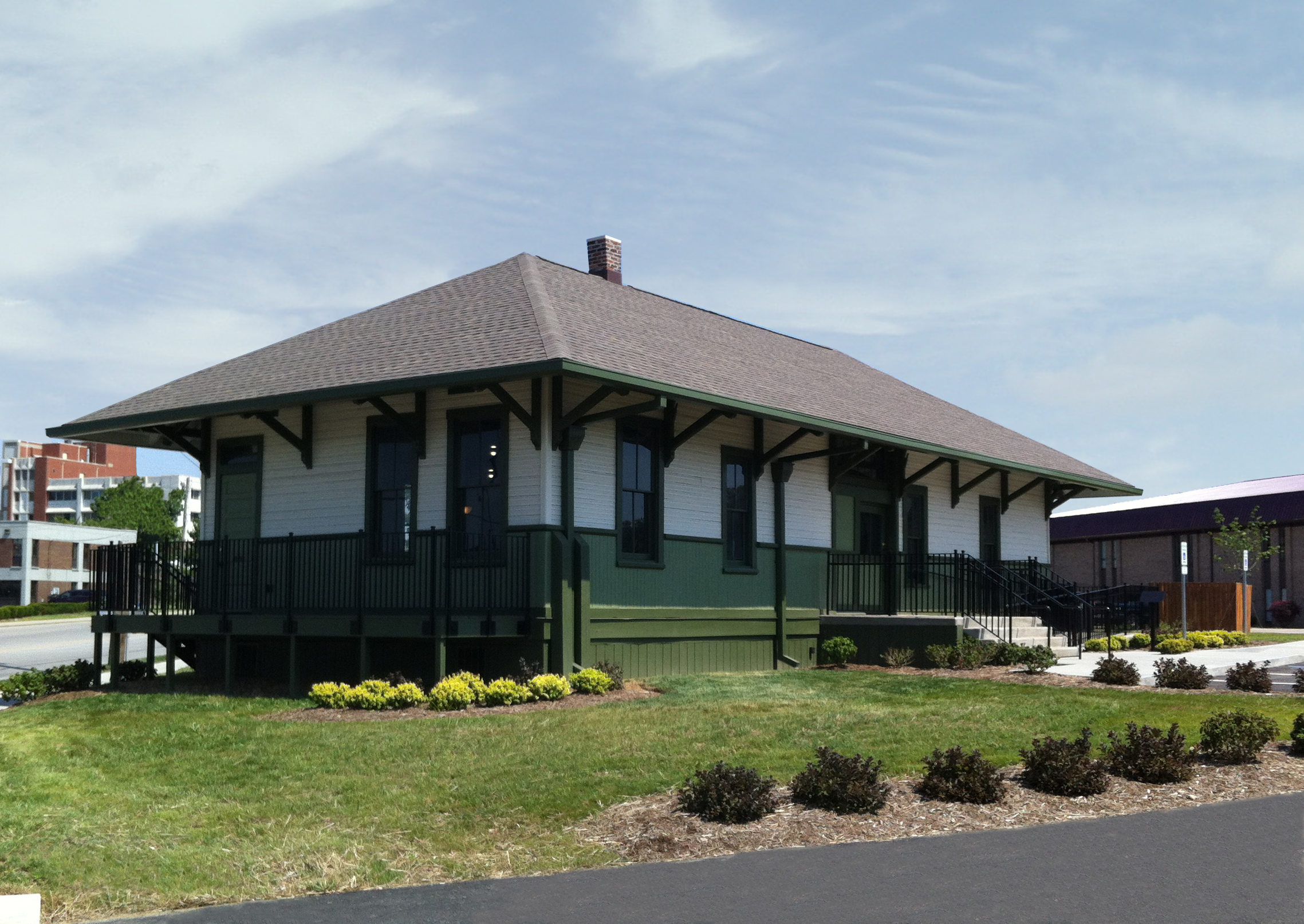
Rehabilitated (2012) - Southwest Corner

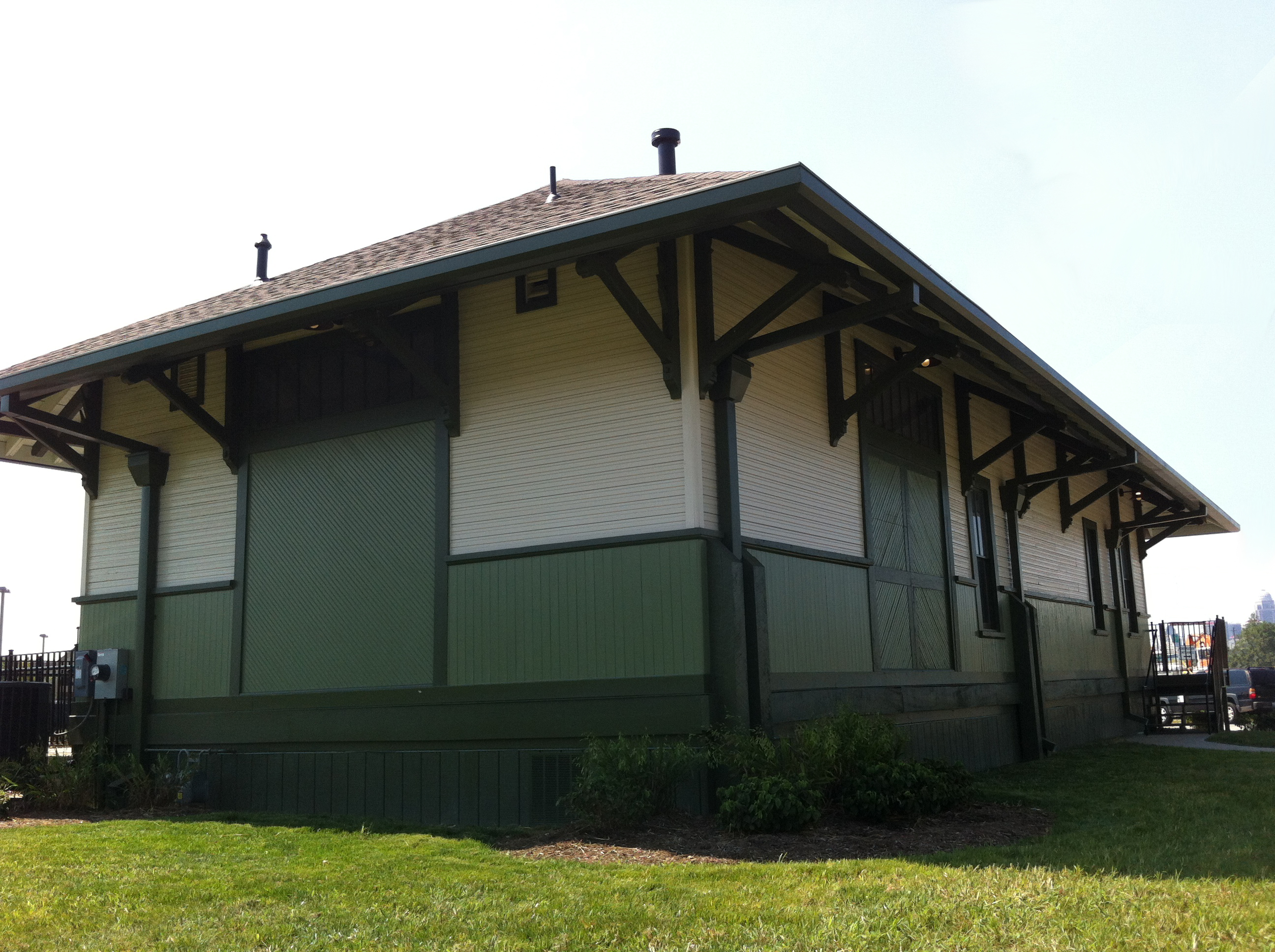
Rehabilitated (2012) - Northeast Corner

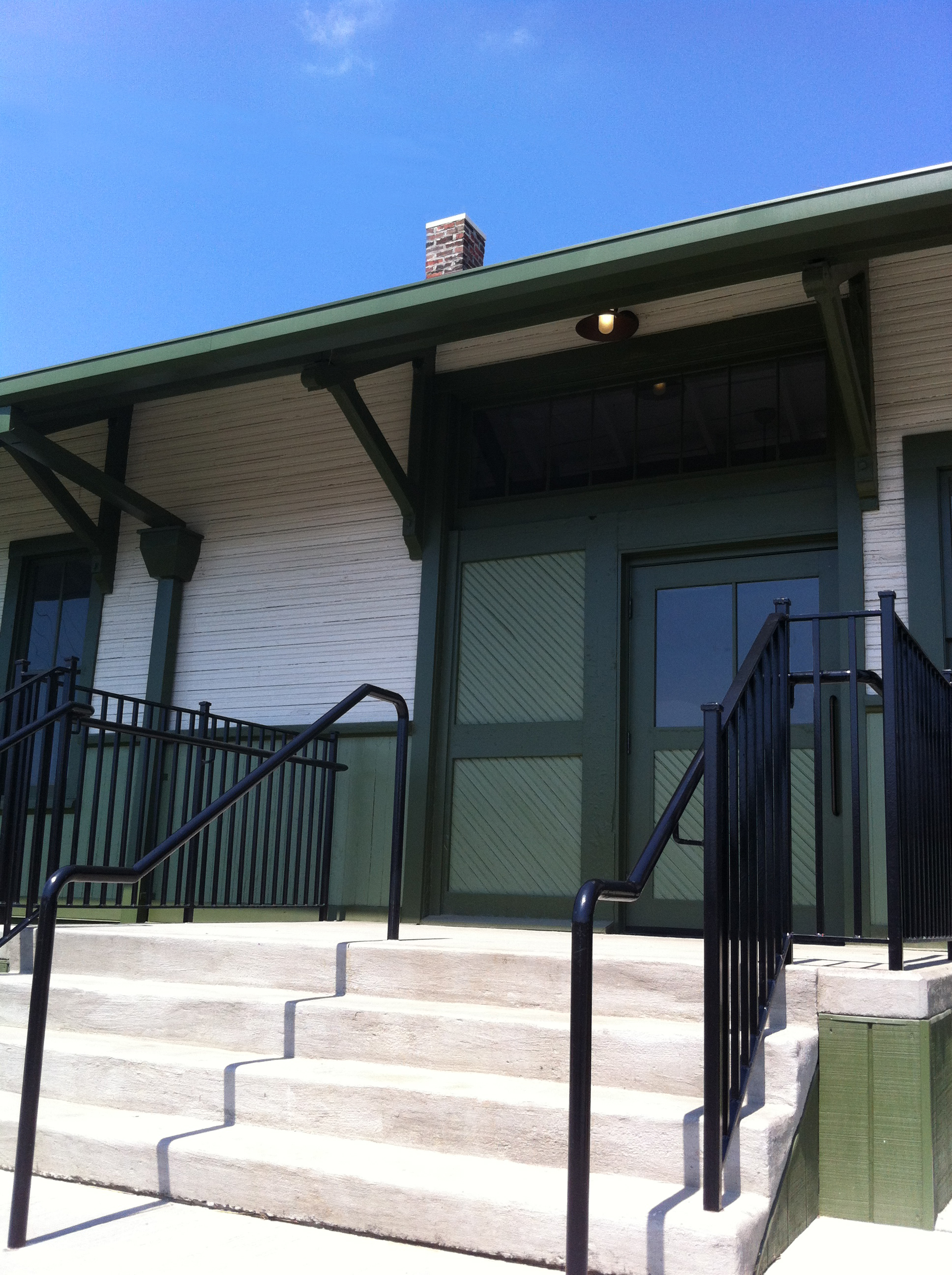
Rehabilitated (2012)- Front Entry

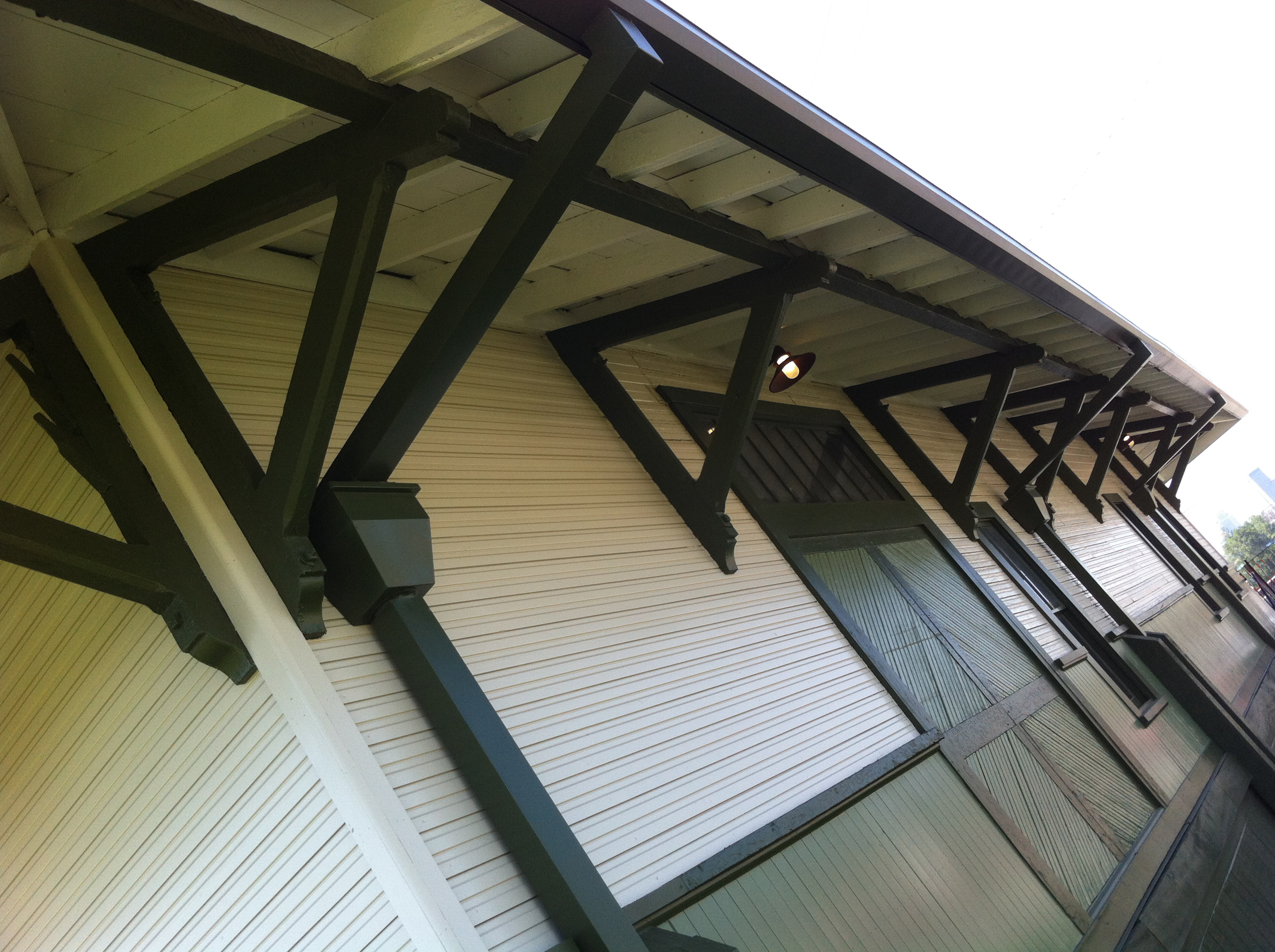
Rehabilitated (2012) Brackets & Eaves

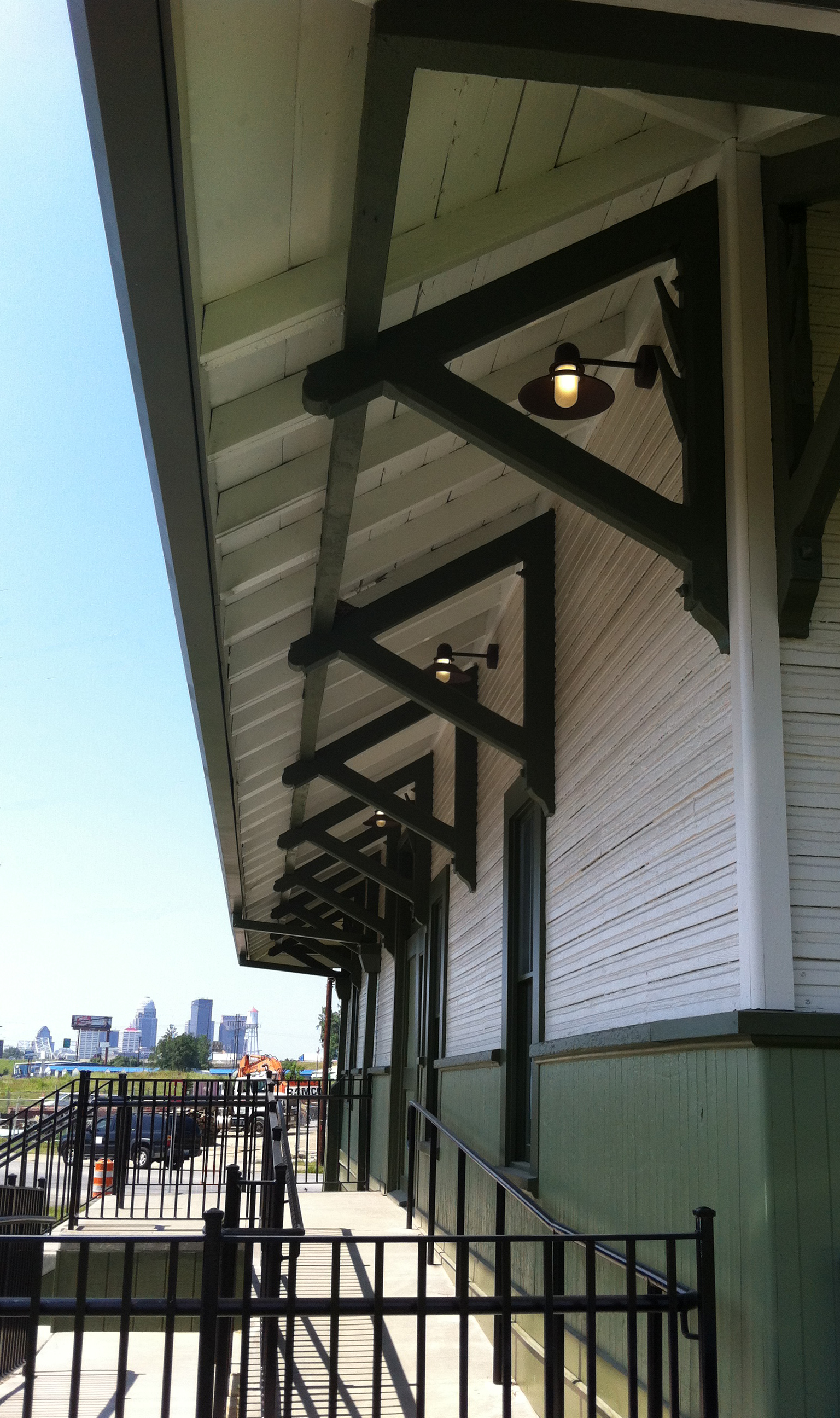
Rehabilitated (2012) - South Eave

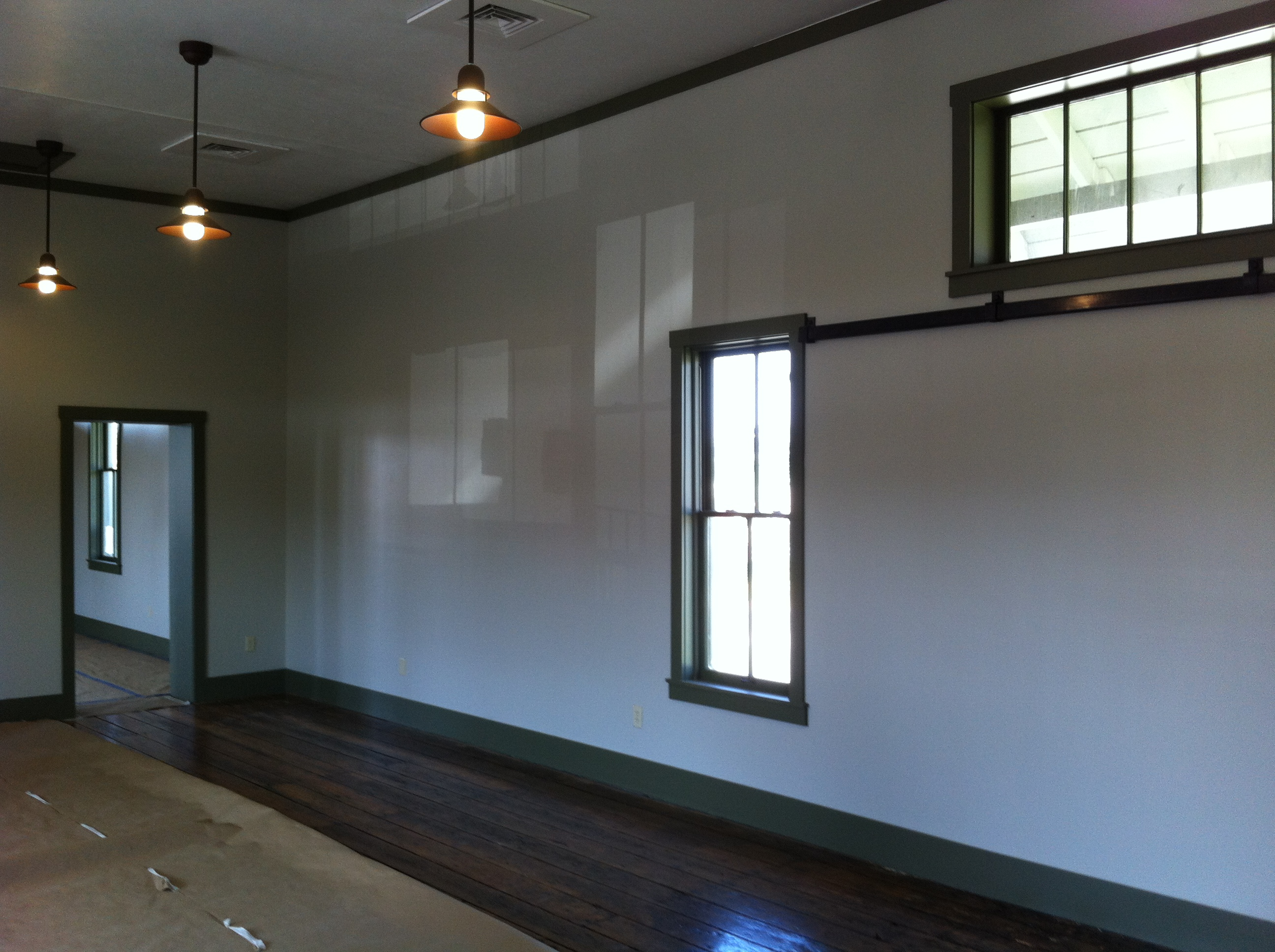
Rehabilitated (2012) - Interior

== See also ==
- Big Four Bridge – Another Big Four property that still remains in Jeffersonville

Preceding station	New York Central Railroad	Following station
North Vernon toward Benton Harbor	Michigan Division	Louisville Terminus
