= The Answer to the Riddle Is Me =

2014 memoir by David Stuart MacLean

The Answer to the Riddle Is Me is a 2014 memoir by David Stuart MacLean, centering on the 2002 incident in which he developed severe amnesia as a reaction to the antimalarial drug Larium, and his subsequent recovery during which he had to rebuild and rediscover his identity.

McLean's first work, it is an expansion of a shorter piece which he performed on This American Life in 2010. It was published by Houghton Mifflin Harcourt.

== Reception ==
The New York Times compared the opening scene of MacLean emerging from a blackout in a crowded train station in India to the work of Robert Ludlum, and stated that "[i]n his descriptions [of events], you can recognize the good fiction writer he must have been even before amnesia forced him to view the world anew." The Los Angeles Times commended it as "a deeply moving account of amnesia that explores the quandary of the self" and "often funny, but (...) also a gripping account of one man’s midnight of the soul," drawing parallels with the works of Michael Ondaatje and William Styron. The Chicago Tribune lauded MacLean's "eye for detail" and "gift for pacing", while noting that the inclusion of "photocopies of train tickets, physician letters, psychiatric center bills and other ephemera" is "probably a necessary device after too many James Frey moments in memoir", and observed that although MacLean "provides a clear and concise outline of the history of mefloquine", the book is not a work of "medical journalism". The Washington Post felt that MacLean's "fear of relapse persists throughout the book and is perhaps the most frightening part", but faulted the prose for "occasionally veer[ing] into metaphor overload." The Boston Globe called it "breezily anecdotal", "brittle self-analysis," and "a study of a man who revels in subverting his own best images", in which "the author all but dares us to find his actions, pre-and-post-Larium, sympathetic."

The York Daily Record considered that MacLean should have devoted more of the book to questions of identity and selfhood, and judged that the book's first half (which depicted MacLean's experiences in a psychiatric hospital in India, where he "fluctuate[d] between psychosis and clarity") was superior to its second (which depicted MacLean's experiences after having returned to America): "(his) very understandable depression, alcohol soaked evenings, vacillation between good and bad choices and self-discovery felt a bit monotonous." Green Mountains Review described the incidents in which McLean "discovers aspects of his past self that he doesn't like" as "startling and poignant." Peter Grandbois, writing in the Los Angeles Review of Books found that "the tension between the need to discover the self and the simultaneous need to turn away from that self (...) drives the second half of the book", but overall saw it as "fall[ing] short of its promise", particularly criticizing McLean's use of excerpts from The Great Gatsby as "lazy and somewhat contrived."

A review in American Journal of Bioethics Neuroscience noted that although MacLean experienced "near complete, then temporally graded retrograde amnesia to most episodic and declarative memory", his "language, semantic, and procedural memory remained mostly intact" — exemplifying "a pattern that should be familiar to the neuroscientist" — and that this "may explain how, albeit with considerable prompting, MacLean was able to type his e-mail password and contact his family, even though hours earlier he had been unaware of his name and had no meaningful recollection of who he was contacting."
