= Sam Sulek =

American fitness YouTuber (born 2002)

Samuel Bishop Sulek
- Born: February 7, 2002 (age 24); Delaware, Ohio, U.S.
- Education: Rutherford B. Hayes High School
- Occupations: YouTuber; fitness influencer; bodybuilder
- Height: 5 ft 11 in (180 cm)

YouTube information
- Channel: Sam Sulek
- Years active: 2023–present
- Genres: Fitness; vlog
- Subscribers: 4.49 million
- Views: 346 million
- Last updated: July 12, 2026

Samuel Bishop Sulek (born February 7, 2002) is an American YouTuber, fitness influencer, and professional bodybuilder in the IFBB Pro League. He initially rose to fame in 2023 with his "Spring Bulk" series of videos on YouTube.

== Life and social media career ==
Sulek attended Rutherford B. Hayes High School in Delaware, Ohio, where he began competitively diving in the summer before his junior year. He began attending Miami University in 2020, where he also joined the school's diving team and, as of 2023, is studying mechanical engineering. He began posting videos of his visits to the gym in January 2023. Since he began posting and as of 2024, his videos have all followed the same format, showing him speaking in his car on the way to the gym, his workout at the gym, then him speaking in his car again. By 2024, he had more than three million subscribers on YouTube and more than 5.7 million followers on Instagram.

== Public image ==
For The New York Times, Chris Almeida wrote that Sulek had "[chosen] a vision and [was] sticking to it" by trusting his viewers and that he had "become a fascination not simply because he is physically massive and fairly charming, but because of his almost defiant commitment to a lo-fi strategy" on YouTube. Stephen Buranyi of The Guardian referred to Sulek as "the current king" of fitness influencers in 2024 and "the perfect example of an influencer" due to his relatability, humility, normalcy, and plainspokenness, also writing that he was "perhaps the most muscular person [he had] ever seen". Also in 2024, Eliana Riley, for The Miami Student, called him "one of the biggest gym influencers on social media right now". For Generation Iron, Dylan Wolf wrote that he was "arguably the most popular influencer in the current fitness industry" in 2024 and that he was "known for his simplicity, heavy lifting, and insane physique". Bodybuilder Chris Bumstead praised Sulek in 2023 as "taking over the world".

Sulek has also faced accusations of using anabolic steroids, including from bodybuilder Víctor Martínez and podcaster Joe Rogan, with Stephen Buranyi noting for The Guardian in 2024 that he was "the person most mentioned by young men [using steroids that he] spoke with". Sulek subtly confirmed his use of steroids in a video in April 2024, saying "that should be pretty obvious. If anybody hasn't gotten to that conclusion on their own from watching these videos then... yeesh."

== Bodybuilding career ==
=== Amateur bodybuilding ===
In February 2025 Sulek announced that he would compete in his first bodybuilding show, the 2025 NPC Legends Classic, in the Classic Physique division. He won his competitive bodybuilding debut, placing first overall in the Classic Physique division, and earning a qualification for the 2025 NPC Arnold Amateur.

He competed at the 2025 NPC Arnold Amateur, winning the Classic Physique Overall amateur contest, and thus earning his IFBB pro card, officially making him a professional bodybuilder.

=== Professional bodybuilding ===
Sulek made his pro debut in the 2026 IFBB Arnold Classic Ohio. Here he placed outside the Top 6 in the Classic Physique division. Later in the same month he competed in the 2026 IFBB Arnold Classic UK, where he finished in seventh place out of nine competitors.

=== Contest history ===
- 1st - NPC Legends Classic, 2025, Classic Physique, Las Vegas, Nevada
- 1st - NPC Arnold Amateur, 2025, Classic Physique, Columbus, Ohio (earned the IFBB Pro Card)
- 8th - IFBB Arnold Classic, 2026, Classic Physique, Columbus, Ohio
- 7th - IFBB Arnold Classic UK, 2026, Classic Physique, Birmingham, England
