= Central Station (Louisville, Kentucky) =

Former rail station in Kentucky, USA

Coordinates: 38.2583°N 85.7610°W

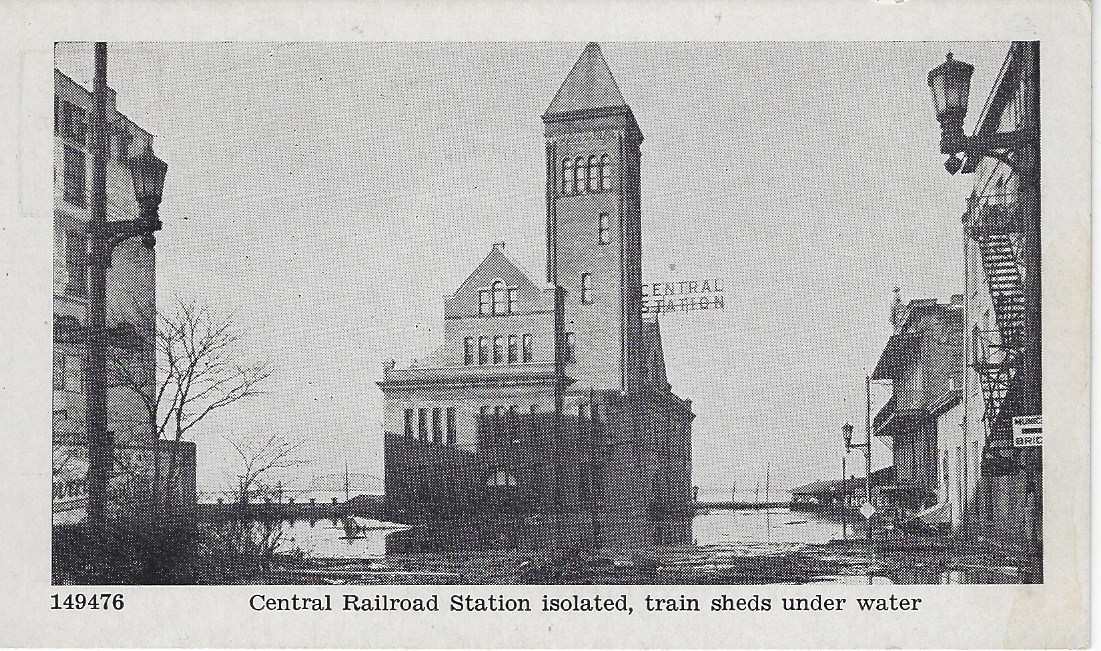
Central Station, inundated in the Ohio River flood of 1937.

Central Station was a major train station in Louisville, Kentucky. Built in the Richardsonian Romanesque style, it served several railroad companies until the mid-20th century. It was situated at North 7th Street and West River Road, near the Ohio River waterfront, and it was also known as the 7th Street Depot.

By 1969, only the Chesapeake and Ohio Railway's George Washington remained at the station. That train last called at the station in April 1971. Central Station was demolished in 1972 to make way for Interstate 64.

The other major station in Louisville was Union Station. There, passenger trains of the Chicago, Indianapolis and Louisville Railroad (Monon), Louisville and Nashville Railroad and Pennsylvania Railroad were served.

== Passenger railroads served and significant services ==
- Baltimore and Ohio Railroad
  - Great Lakes Limited – day train bound for Detroit, via Cincinnati (in the southerly direction from Detroit passengers needed to get a local connection for the trip from Cincinnati to Louisville)
  - Cincinnatian – beginning in 1950, this name was reassigned from an eastern itinerary to the Great Lakes Limited route
  - Night Express night train to Detroit, on same route as the above
  - local trains to Cincinnati, making connections to the Cincinnatian (Baltimore–Cincinnati), Diplomat (Jersey City – St. Louis) and the National Limited (Jersey City – St. Louis)
- Chesapeake and Ohio Railway
  - train sections carrying coaches and sleepers of the George Washington and Sportsman to Ashland, Kentucky, making connecting to the main part of those Phoebus, Virginia and Washington, D.C.-bound trains; by the early 1950s those trains were shortened from Phoebus to Newport News. Frankfort, Kentucky and Lexington (Union Station) were also on the Louisville - Ashland route.
- Cleveland, Cincinnati, Chicago and St. Louis Railway (absorbed into the New York Central Railroad in 1930)
  - local trains to Elkhart and South Bend
- Illinois Central Railroad
  - Irvin S. Cobb – train bound for Fulton, Kentucky, connecting to the Chickasaw train to Memphis, Tennessee, whereupon a connection could be made to the New Orleans–bound Lousiane (previously, in the early 1940s, the Louisiane originated in Louisville, and took the entire route above described for the Irvin S. Cobb, as a secondary originating counterpart to the main train section originating in Chicago)
  - Kentucky Cardinal – train bound for Memphis, whereupon a connection could be made to the New Orleans–bound Panama Limited (likewise, until the early 1940s, the Creole originated in Louisville, and took the entire route above described for the Creole, as a secondary originating counterpart to the main train section originating in Chicago)

Preceding station	Baltimore and Ohio Railroad	Following station
Terminus	Louisville – North Vernon	Jeffersonville toward North Vernon
Preceding station	Chesapeake and Ohio Railway	Following station
Terminus	Louisville – Ashland	Seventh Street toward Ashland
Preceding station	Illinois Central Railroad	Following station
West Point toward Memphis	Memphis – Louisville	Terminus
Preceding station	New York Central Railroad	Following station
Jeffersonville toward Benton Harbor	Michigan Division	Terminus
