= Delaware City School District =

School district in Ohio

Address
- 74 W. William Street Delaware, Ohio, 43015; United States
- Coordinates: 40°17′56″N 83°4′19″W

District information
- Motto: Achieving Excellence, Honoring Tradition
- Grades: PreK-12
- Superintendent: Keith Pomeroy
- Schools: 7
- NCES District ID: 3904387

Students and staff
- Students: 5,595 (2022-23)
- Teachers: 281.66 (FTE)
- Student–teacher ratio: 19.86

Other information
- Website: www.dcs.k12.oh.us

Delaware City Local School District is a public school district serving students in the city of Delaware, Ohio, United States. The school district enrolls about 5,595 students as of the 2022–2023 academic year. The Frank B. Willis Education Center (formerly the Intermediate School and High School) is home to the administrative offices of the district.

== Administration ==
The district is led by the Superintendent and the DCS Board of Education. The superintendent is appointed by the board and runs the district's day-to-day operations. As of August 1, 2025, Keith Pomeroy is the district's superintendent. Members of the board are elected to 4-year terms by the citizens of the district. Each school year, a senior at Hayes High School is appointed by the school's principal to serve on the board for the duration of the school year. While this student does not have voting powers on the board, they do serve as a voice for the students of the district. The 2025–2026 academic year student board member is Mazie Fitzharris.

=== Board of education ===
- Ted Backus, President
- Janelle Gasaway, Vice President
- Abby Buckerfield
- Melissa Harris
- Michael Wiener
- Mazie Fitzharris, Student Board Member

== Schools ==
=== Elementary schools ===
- Ervin Carlisle Elementary School (K-5th)
- James Conger Elementary School (PreK-5th)
- Robert F. Schultz Elementary School (K-5th)
- David Smith Elementary School (K-5th)
- Laura Woodward Elementary School (PreK-5th)

=== Middle schools ===
- John C. Dempsey Middle School (6th-8th)

=== High schools ===
- Rutherford B. Hayes High School (9th-12th)
