= George Washington (train) =

Cincinnati-DC passenger rail service

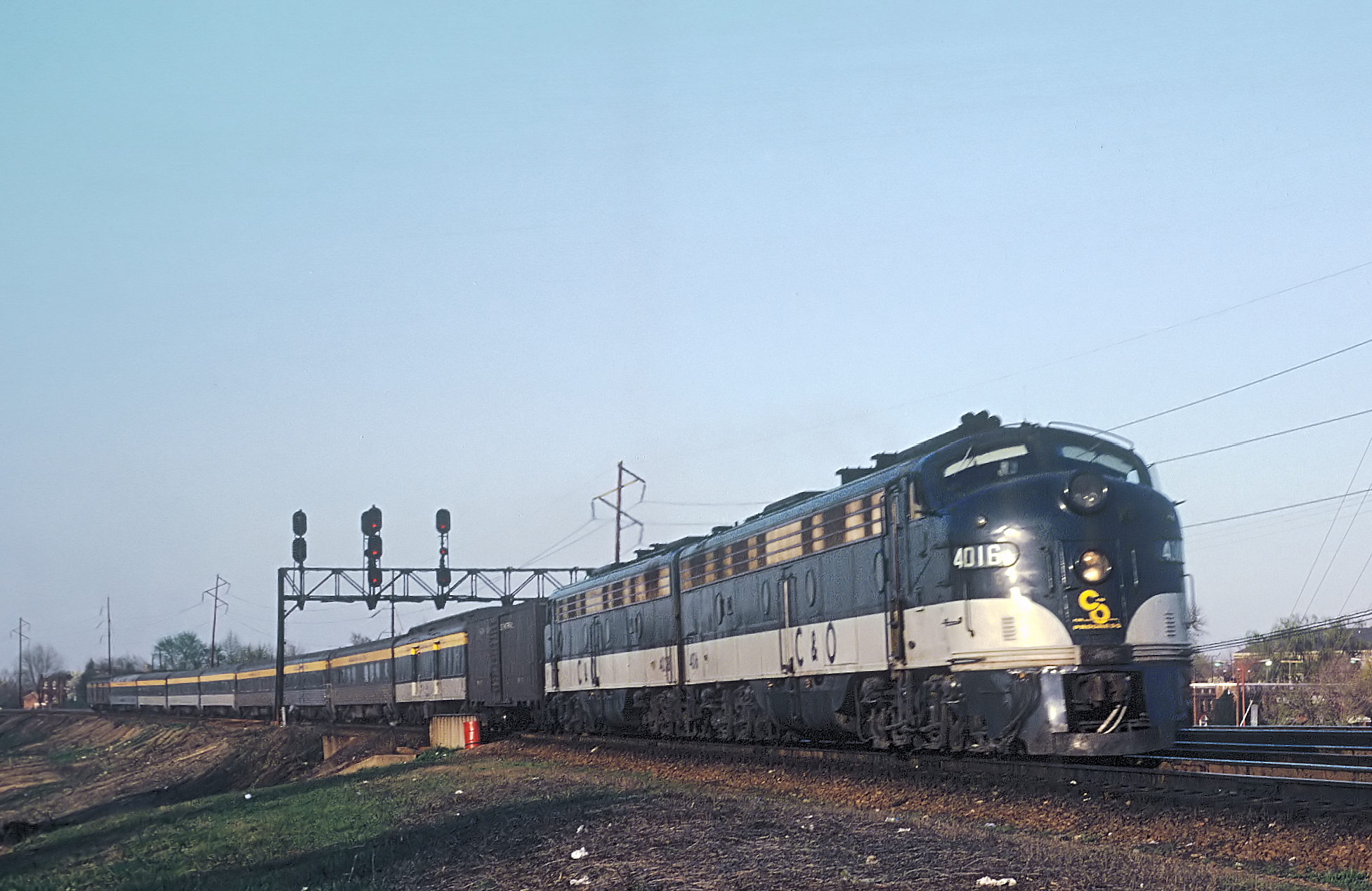
- The streamlined George Washington in 1969, approaching Alexandria, Virginia

Overview
- Service type: Inter-city rail
- Status: Discontinued
- Locale: Midwestern United States; Mid-Atlantic United States
- First service: 1932
- Last service: 1974
- Former operator: Chesapeake and Ohio Railway

Route
- Termini: Washington, DC and Phoebus, Virginia; Cincinnati, Ohio and Louisville, Kentucky
- Distance travelled: 599 miles (964 km) (Washington -- Cincinnati) 664 miles (1,069 km) (Phoebus-Cincinnati)
- Service frequency: Daily
- Train numbers: 1-41-21 (westbound); 2-22-42 (eastbound)

On-board services
- Seating arrangements: Reclining seat coaches
- Sleeping arrangements: Roomettes and double bedrooms (1954)
- Catering facilities: Dining car

Technical
- Track gauge: 1,435 mm (4 ft 8 1/2 in)

The George Washington was a named passenger train of the Chesapeake and Ohio Railway running between Cincinnati, Ohio and Washington, D.C. that operated from 1932, the 200th anniversary of the birth of George Washington, to 1974. A section divided from the main train at Gordonsville, Virginia and operated through Richmond to Phoebus, Virginia. From the west, a section originated in Louisville and joined at Ashland.

== History ==
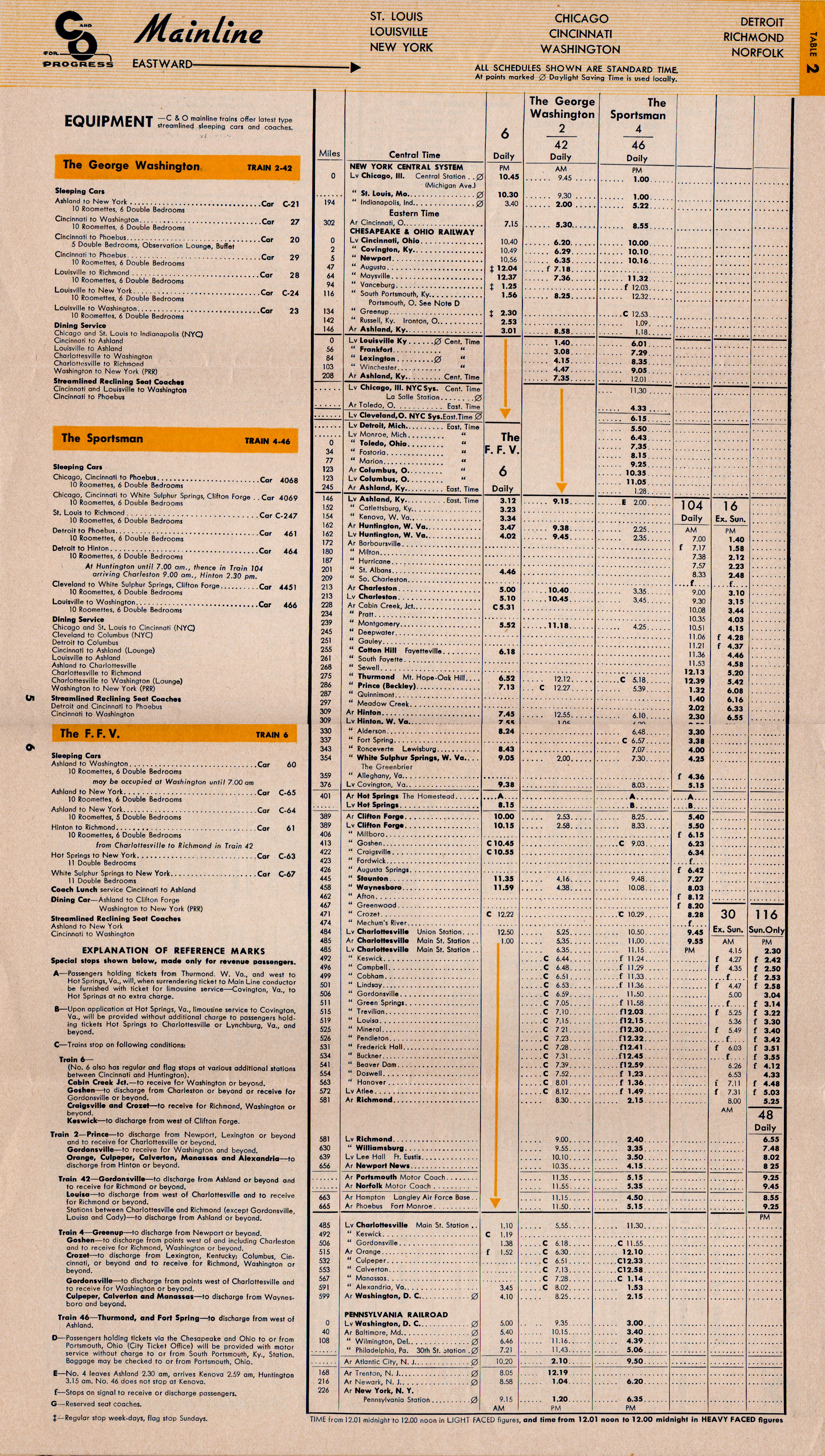
Chesapeake and Ohio Railway Passenger Timetable Mainline Schedule Eff. 1953-04-26

When the George Washington was inaugurated as C&O's top-notch train on April 30, 1932, it was one of only two all-air-conditioned, long-distance trains operating in America. (the other was the Baltimore and Ohio Railroad's Capitol Limited, which was instituted as an all-air-conditioned train only a week or so before the George Washington). New equipment was not built for this train; instead, older cars that were completely refurbished by Pullman and by C&O shops. It was still a few years before the streamliner craze, so C&O persisted with the standards of the time using its solid, heavy cars.

The Pullman Company normally lettered its sleepers in a standardized fashion so that they could be interchanged and routed in any train in the United States with some uniformity, but there were some "name trains" to which specific cars were assigned on a regular basis, and C&O's George Washington was one of these. They differed from the standard Pullman sleepers in that they had the name of the train at the center of the letterboard where "PULLMAN" was usually placed, while the word "PULLMAN" was relocated to the end of the letterboard in small letters.

After leaving Washington, the George passed through Virginia's horse country of Blue Ridge and Shenandoah Valley before assaulting the Allegheny Mountains en route to The Greenbrier, a C&O-owned luxury resort in White Sulphur Springs, West Virginia. It then descended through the New River Gorge before crossing into Ohio. In addition to carrying cars on the main route to Cincinnati, the train also carried through coaches and through sleeping cars from Washington to Louisville, Kentucky's Central Station via Lexington's Union Station, on a branch that broke off, due west at Ashland, Kentucky.

In keeping with the theme, all the sleeping, dining, and lounge cars on the train were named for people, places, or events connected with Washington's life. In the sleepers the rooms were likewise given names of people associated with him. Booklets about Washington's life, followed by descriptions of the new train, were issued; the train appeared in advertising in major magazines and on C&O timetables.

The April 1952 issue of Tracks Magazine reported:

"The George is a sizeable train as it pulls into Covington,(Ky): engine, three baggage cars, a diner, three coaches, four Pullman cars. The crew to handle it reflects its size: engineer, fireman, conductor, assistant conductor, flagman, Pullman conductor, four Pullman porters, two train porters, dining car steward, ten waiters, two baggagemen."

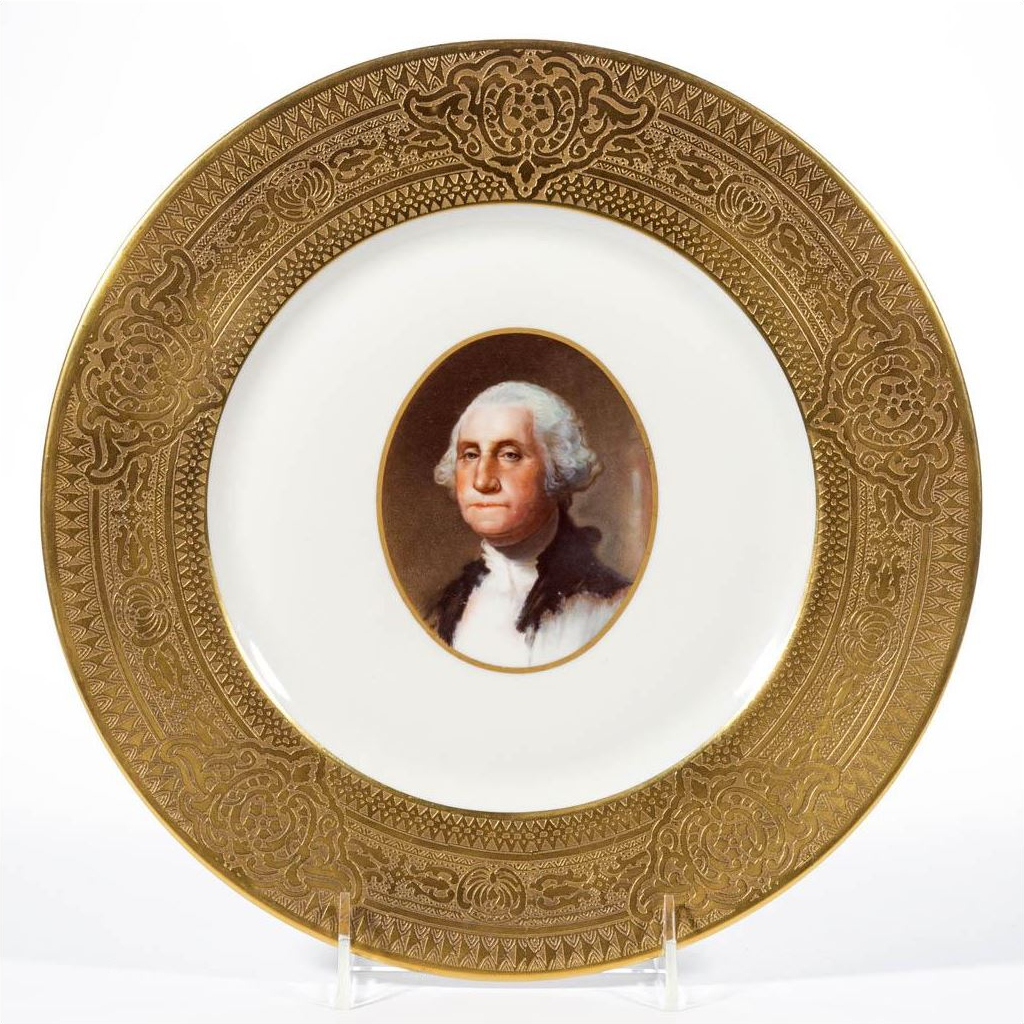
Buffalo Pottery plate made for the George Washington

The George Washington was also known for its diner and its beautiful china manufactured by Buffalo Pottery. The diners on the George traveled all the way from Washington to Cincinnati.

After World War II, C&O chairman Robert Ralph Young attempted to upgrade the George Washington route service with newer equipment and steam turbine motive power. However, despite the C&O's substantial investment and planning, the project (which was to be called the '"Chessie") was aborted before service was to begin. In that era, automobiles and airline travel were quickly increasing their market share over long distance passenger rail services in the United States.

Between 1953 and 1954, the C&O shifted the eastern terminus for its Norfolk/Hampton Roads area passenger trains west from Phoebus, Virginia to Newport News station.

Beginning September 7, 1965, the by-then affiliated Baltimore and Ohio Railroad's National Limited through Washington to St. Louis coaches and sleeping cars were combined with the George Washington running on C&O rails between Washington and Cincinnati and B&O rails between Cincinnati and St. Louis. An added feature at that time was the showing of first-run movies in the "Movie Coach" between Washington and Cincinnati.

In 1968 the C&O collapsed the Ashland, Kentucky - Columbus - Detroit #46/47 service of the former Sportsman into the George Washington. However, sleeper service on that section was eliminated in the consolidation.

Amtrak took over intercity passenger rail service on May 1, 1971. Thereupon, the train lost its western section to Louisville. Amtrak kept the George Washington, including both the Washington and Newport News sections. Starting in July, Amtrak began integrating the George with the James Whitcomb Riley, an old New York Central/Penn Central daytimer running from Cincinnati to Chicago. The George began exchanging through Washington-Chicago and Newport News-Chicago coaches with the Riley at Cincinnati on July 12, adding a through sleeping car on September 8. Earlier, the George had exchanged through sleepers with the Riley for most of the 1950s.

The two trains merged on November 14, 1971; the George Washington name was used for the eastbound train until May 19, 1974. The Riley was renamed the Cardinal in 1977. The present-day Cardinal still operates over much of the former George Washington route between Cincinnati and Washington. The Newport News section of the James Whitcomb Riley was replaced by the New York-Newport News Colonial (later merged into the Northeast Regional brand) on June 14, 1976.

== Chessie, The Sleeping Kitten ==
Chessie, mascot of the C & O RR

Part of the reason for the success of the George Washington, aside from the scenery the train passed through, was the highly successful advertising campaign of Chessie the sleeping kitten. The kitten debuted in 1933 to promote the C&O's passenger trains with the catch phrase "Sleep Like A Kitten." While the kitten's rendition is credited to Guido Grenewald, the success of the tiny feline as an advertising campaign for the railroad is honored to Lionel Probert, an assistant to the C&O president at the time.

== The 1950 coaches ==
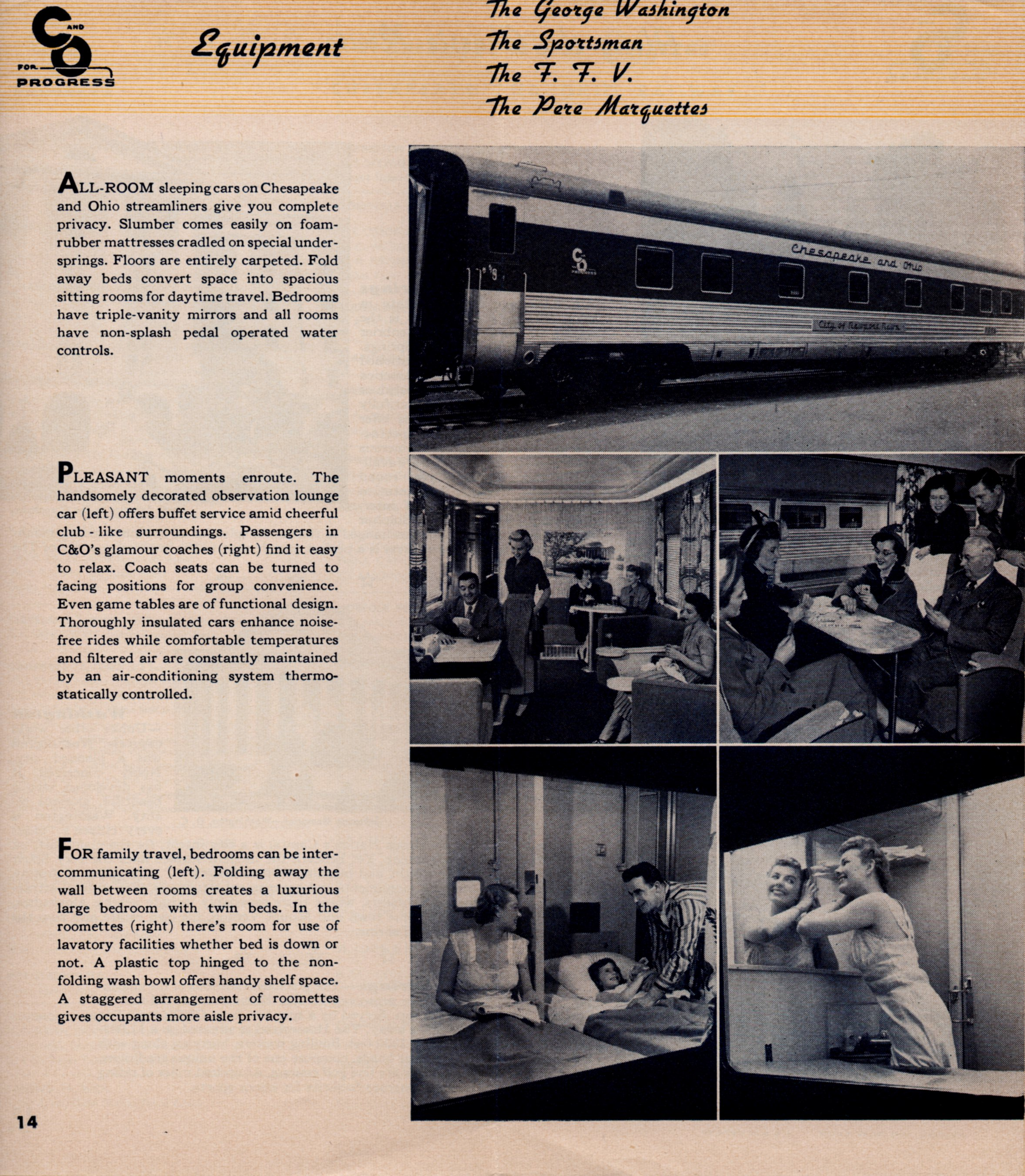
Chesapeake and Ohio Railway Passenger Timetable Equipment Eff. 1953-04-26

These cars were in two sections divided in the center. Fifty-nine coaches in the 1610-1668 series were delivered to the C&O by Pullman for service on most C&O trains, including the George Washington. Eight of these cars were sold to the Denver and Rio Grande Western Railroad. Good photographs of this car may be found on page 8 of "Chesapeake and Ohio color guide to freight and passenger equipment". C&O removed the corrugations in 1967.

== The 1950 sleepers ==
On the George Washington the C&O used the new Pullman 10-roomette/6-bedroom 85’ sleepers built in the "City of" series, and 56 were built. Some C&O cars were used on the Pere Marquette; these cars were unusual in that the bedrooms were in the middle rather than on one end. See photos on page 107 of "Some Classic Trains", page 189 of "More Classic Trains", or page 9 of "Chesapeake and Ohio color guide to freight" and passenger equipment.
