= Sportsman (train) =

Chesapeake and Ohio Railway passenger train

Olti
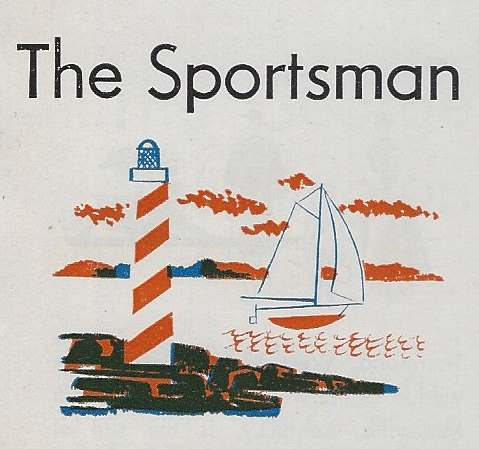
- Sportsman one-time logo in 1948 C&O timetable

Overview
- Service type: Inter-city rail
- Status: Discontinued
- Locale: Mid-West, Mid-Atlantic States
- First service: 1930
- Last service: 1968
- Former operator(s): Chesapeake and Ohio Railway

Route
- Termini: Washington, D.C., and Phoebus, Virginia, latter shortened in final decade to Newport News; Detroit, Michigan, Louisville, Kentucky and Cincinnati
- Service frequency: Daily
- Train number(s): Detroit-Phoebus: 46 (eastbound), 47 (westbound); Cincinnati-Washington, D.C.: 4 (eastbound), 5 (westbound)

On-board services
- Seating arrangements: "Imperial Salon Cars" for coach passengers: with reclining seats [1950]
- Sleeping arrangements: Sections, double bedrooms, compartments, drawing rooms
- Catering facilities: Dining cars

The Sportsman was a named passenger night train of the Chesapeake and Ohio Railway. It was the Chesapeake and Ohio's long-standing train bound for Detroit from Washington, D.C., and Phoebus, Virginia, on the Chesapeake Bay, opposite Norfolk, Virginia. It was unique among C&O trains for its route north from the C&O mainline in southern Ohio. For most of its years it had a secondary western terminus in Louisville at its Central Station.

== History ==
The train was begun in 1930. In its early years it appeared on Pere Marquette Railway timetables as meeting with Pere Marquette trains at Detroit, for reaching Saginaw and Bay City. In its conception it was designed to connect resort areas of the Great Lakes and towards travelers to the Michigan lakes region, its direct region service accessed mountain resort destinations in Virginia and West Virginia. However, by the 1940s the C&O's emphasis was on attractions in West Virginia. This emphasis was evident in the relatively low population towns in West Virginia such as Hinton and White Sulphur Springs (which is near The Greenbrier) as receiving emphasis in abbreviated timetables shown in the condensed timetables sections of the Chesapeake and Ohio timetables, and in the text accompanying the train's schedule in a 1948 C&O timetable.

=== Multiple sections ===
In number assignment, the Phoebus-Detroit section was No. 47, the Detroit-Phoebus section was No. 46. The Washington-Cincinnati section was No. 5 and the Cincinnati-Washington section was No. 4.

Northwest of Ashland, Kentucky, as No. 5, the train accommodated sleepers carried by the New York Central to Chicago and St. Louis. Eastbound, these trains were labeled No. 4.

== 1950s changes ==
By late 1951 the open-section sleepers on the Sportsman were replaced by modern roomettes. The C&O moved the eastern terminus in its Hampton Roads area trains west from Phoebus to Newport News in the mid-1950s, thus, the eastern destination of the Sportsman became Newport News.

Demand in central Kentucky on the Ashland-Lexington-Louisville branch declined, and the C&O eliminated that section from the train by 1956.

== Declining years ==
The more scenic views was the eastbound direction's daylight hours. And the opposite was the case with the C&O's FFV or Fast Flying Virginian, which had a similar route, excepting the Detroit assignment of the route. The C&O consolidated routes in 1962 and eliminated the westbound route of the Sportsman and the eastbound route of the FFV. The northwestern end of the route duplicated the B&O's Detroit-Washington Ambassador train. The C&O reduced service to the point where the Sportsman only ran one direction. The C&O finally dropped the Sportsman from the schedule in 1968.

While the C&O had dropped the Sportsman from its schedule, it continued to run coaches from Newport News to Detroit as No. 47, and coaches in the reverse direction as No. 46, both as part of the itinerary of the George Washington. And with the folding of Nos. 46 and 47 into the George Washington, the sleeping car option to or from Detroit was eliminated. However, in 1969 schedule the eastbound coaches only ran from Detroit to Huntington. Passengers wishing to continue their trip east would need to transfer at Huntington to another coach. In the final months before C&O passenger operations were folded into Amtrak, the Nos. 46 and 47 was only operating Ashland to Detroit and weekends only. These numbers and service north from Huntington to Columbus, then Detroit, was terminated on April 30, 1971.
