= David Stuart MacLean =

American writer

David Stuart MacLean is an American writer. He is the author of The Answer to the Riddle Is Me, a memoir of his mefloquine-induced delirium and amnesia.

MacLean has a Ph.D. in Literature/Creative Writing from The University of Houston, an M.F.A. from New Mexico State University and he was a Fulbright scholar in India. He won a PEN/America Center award in 2011 as the Best Emerging Writer in Non-Fiction. His essays and stories have appeared in The New York Times, The Guardian, Ploughshares, Bennington Review, Guernica, and the radio program This American Life. MacLean is a visiting faculty member of the creative writing program at the University of Chicago. He has been a guest on Duncan Trussell's podcast, The Duncan Trussell Family Hour. In 2021, he published the novel How I Learned to Hate in Ohio with The Overlook Press.

He lives in Chicago.
