= Ohio Music Education Association =

OMEA logo

The Ohio Music Education Association (OMEA) is the Ohio state-level affiliate of MENC: The National Association for Music Education. Of the 52 federated state affiliates of MENC, the OMEA is the third largest and is one of only two state-level affiliate chartered as a "music education association" rather than a "music educators association."

The OMEA was founded in 1924 in as the Ohio School Band Association (OSBA) by fourteen band directors "to promote high school band contests" in Ohio. In 1929, the OSBA changed its name to the Ohio School Band and Orchestra Association (OSBOA) to reflect its newly expanded emphasis including school orchestras. In 1932, all aspects of music education were brought in, forming the OMEA. One of the oldest music education associations in the United States, the OMEA recently celebrated its 75th anniversary in 2007.

The OMEA is involved at all levels of music education in Ohio, serving more than 1.8 million public school students from 612 school districts and 51 colleges and universities. The OMEA continually sponsors both regional and statewide contests.
