= Blacklog Creek =

River in Pennsylvania, United States

Coordinates: 40.25340°N 77.844078°W

Blacklog Creek is a 28.5-mile-long (45.9 km) tributary of Aughwick Creek in Huntingdon County, Pennsylvania, in the United States.

It rises in the Tuscarora State Forest and flows southwestward between Blacklog Mountain to the northwest and Shade Mountain to the southeast, forming the Blacklog Valley. After a long run down the valley, it joins Shade Creek and turns west, carving the Blacklog Narrows through Blacklog Mountain. This gap carries U.S. Route 522 and the former grade of the narrow gauge East Broad Top Railroad's Shade Gap Branch (now occupied by the Rockhill Trolley Museum's standard gauge Shade Gap Electric Railway), and was formerly the site of the Winchester and Rockhill iron furnaces. The Narrows was also the site of at least two iron ore mines during the 1870s. Blacklog Creek flows between Rockhill and Orbisonia, cuts through Saddle Back Ridge and joins Aughwick Creek approximately two miles downstream of the two towns.

== See also ==
- List of rivers of Pennsylvania
