= Electroliner =

Train

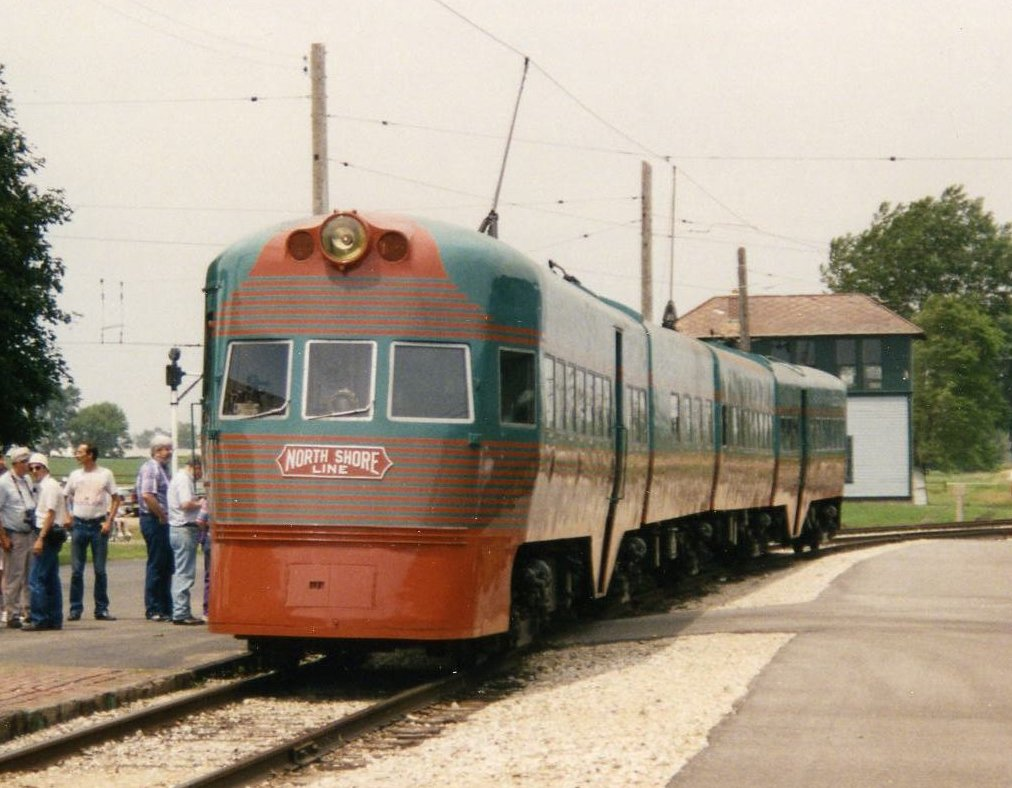
- Passengers boarding the restored Electroliner at the Illinois Railway Museum.
- In service: 1941–1978
- Manufacturer: St. Louis Car Company
- Constructed: 1941
- Entered service: 1941
- Refurbished: 1963
- Number built: 2
- Number preserved: 2
- Formation: A-B-C-A1
- Fleet numbers: 801–802, 803–804
- Operators: Chicago North Shore and Milwaukee Railroad, Philadelphia Suburban Transportation Company, SEPTA
- Lines served: Skokie Valley Route, Milwaukee Division, Norristown High Speed Line

Specifications
- Train length: 155 feet 4 inches (47.35 m)
- Height: 12 feet 7 inches (3.84 m)
- Doors: 4 passenger, 2 cab
- Articulated sections: 4
- Maximum speed: 110 mph (180 km/h)
- Weight: 214,000 pounds (97,000 kg)
- Traction motors: 8x GE 1443B
- Electric systems: 600 V DC third rail or overhead line
- Current collection: Overhead line: Trolley pole Third rail: Contact shoe
- Bogies: Jacobs bogies
- Braking system: Westinghouse
- Multiple working: No
- Track gauge: 4 ft 8 1/2 in (1,435 mm) standard gauge

The Electroliners are a pair of articulated streamlined interurban electric multiple units built by the St. Louis Car Company in 1941. Initially numbered 801–802 and 803–804, they were operated by the Chicago North Shore and Milwaukee Railroad from 1941 to 1963, followed by the Philadelphia Suburban Transportation Company (later SEPTA) from 1964 to 1978. Since their retirement, both train sets have been preserved in railway museums.

== Operation ==
Each set consists of two end coaches and two center coaches. The coaches are articulated using Jacobs bogies. Each end coach is divided at the side doors into a Luxury Coach, which seats 30, and a Smoking Coach, which seats 10 and also has a restroom . Each door has steps and a trapdoor to permit boarding from street-level, low-level, and high-level platforms. One center coach seats 40, and the other is a tavern lounge that seats 26. All cars are air-conditioned, a first among new traction (interurban and trolley) equipment of the time.

The sets were designed to operate with the high platforms, sharp curves, and narrow clearances of the Chicago Loop and the Chicago 'L', to run at speeds of 80 miles per hour (130 km/h) or more on the North Shore's main line; and to use city streets to the downtown Milwaukee Terminal. The sets' styling resembled that of the Pioneer Zephyr and influenced the styling of other electric train sets, notably the Odakyū 3000 series SE Romance Cars. The articulated truck/bogie design allowed very smooth running with none of the horizontal movement characteristic of non-articulated equipment. Although they were streamlined, the sets were not permitted to run faster than conventional North Shore equipment. From the front passenger seat adjacent to the motorman's half-cab, if the door was propped open, a passenger could see the speedometer pegged at 90 mph on the long stretch between Dempster Street and North Chicago Junction. When the sets were received in 1941, during one test run the traction motors were allowed full field shunt to determine absolute maximum speed. It reached just over 110 mph (180 km/h), but at that speed the train reached highway crossings before the crossing gates fully closed, a dangerous situation. Thereafter, the sets were limited to 90 mph (140 km/h).

== History ==
The North Shore was struggling financially in 1940 and was on the edge of bankruptcy. The effects of the Great Depression were still being felt, plus it had almost side-by-side competition from the Chicago and North Western Railroad and the nearby Milwaukee Road. All of its operating equipment had been constructed in the 1920s and exhibited wear. But it offered convenient stops around the Loop on the Chicago 'L', to which it ran from the Chicago-Evanston city boundary. The North Shore's unionized workforce was concerned about job losses if the line closed, so when company management approached them with a proposal to purchase new streamliners to invigorate passenger service, employees agreed to a reduction in pay. The sets were designed by the St. Louis Car Company and North Shore's engineering staff. When they arrived in 1941, they were well received by the public. The nation's economy was beginning to improve; earnings increased, older equipment was refurbished for appearance and comfort, and the North Shore changed from a typical Midwestern interurban to a high-speed regional commuter railroad, running at high speed between two major cities. In the 1960s, competition from freeways eroded ridership, income dropped, maintenance and operating costs climbed, and the line was abandoned in January 1963.

=== Liberty Liners ===
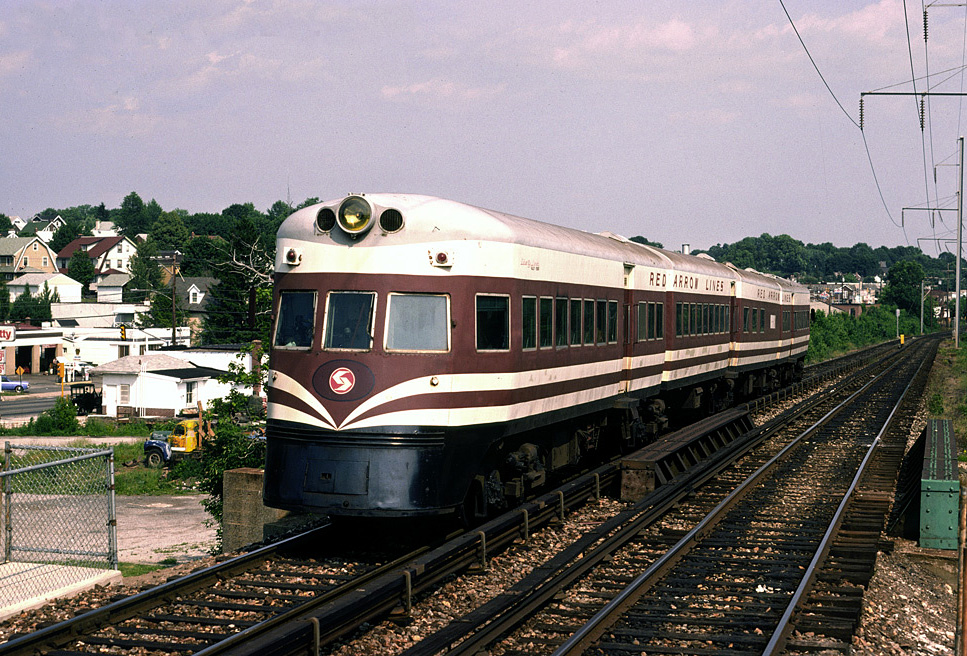
A Liberty liner in the 1970s

After the North Shore ceased operations, the sets were sold to the Philadelphia Suburban Transportation Company, known as the Red Arrow Lines, and renamed Liberty Liners. The trolley poles and steps were removed, new doors were added in the center coach sections, and updated third-rail contact shoes were installed to operate on the Norristown High Speed Line, which uses third rail and high-level platforms between Upper Darby and Norristown. The tavern-lounges continued in service, providing coffee and pastry in the morning, and beverages and snacks in the evening. 801-802 was named "Valley Forge", while 803-804 became "Independence Hall". They were retired in 1978.

== Preservation ==
801-802 is currently being restored to its early 1960s operating condition at the Illinois Railway Museum (IRM) in Union, Illinois and is operational as of 2023. Current efforts are now focused on restoring the interior. Updates on the restoration can be found on the liners Facebook page "IRM Electroliner"

803-804 is preserved at the Rockhill Trolley Museum in Orbisonia, Pennsylvania. It is operational, but has not been subject to major restoration efforts.

== Models ==
Model railroad company Con-Cor initially planned on releasing an HO scale Electroliner train set in 2003/2004, but cancelled the project due to lack of interest, and produced a Pioneer Zephyr set instead. In 2007, the company announced that the project was being resumed; its model was released in mid-2009. The trainset has been produced in brass in HO Scale by several companies. MTH Electric Trains announced the release of an O scale Electroliner in 2007; both Electroliner and Liberty Liner versions were released in 2010.

== Gallery ==
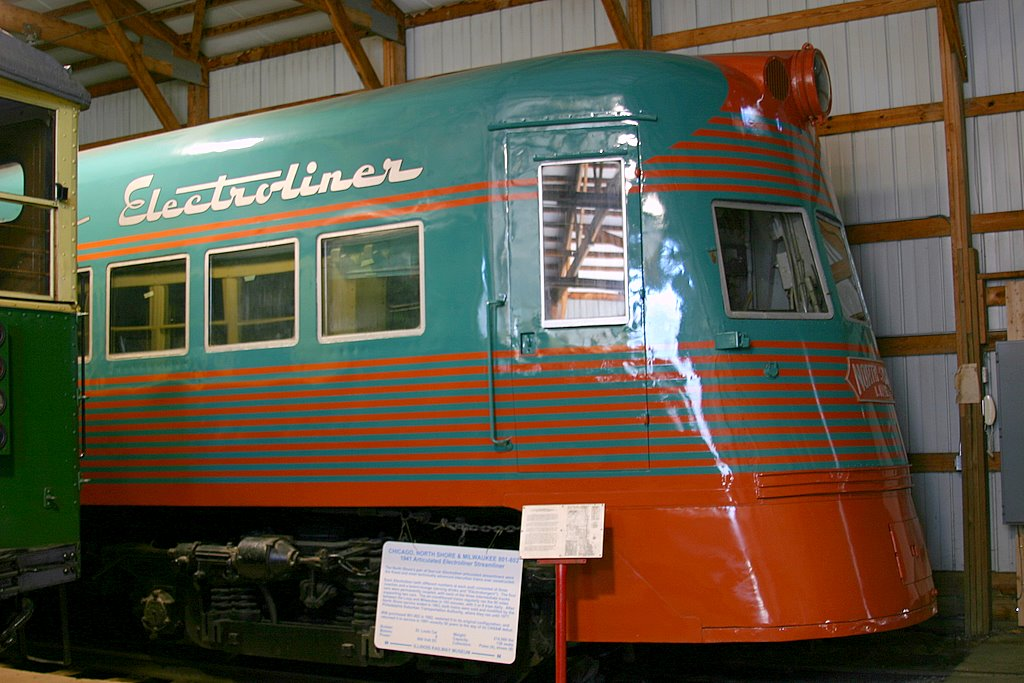
Side of 801-802, at the Illinois Railroad Museum.

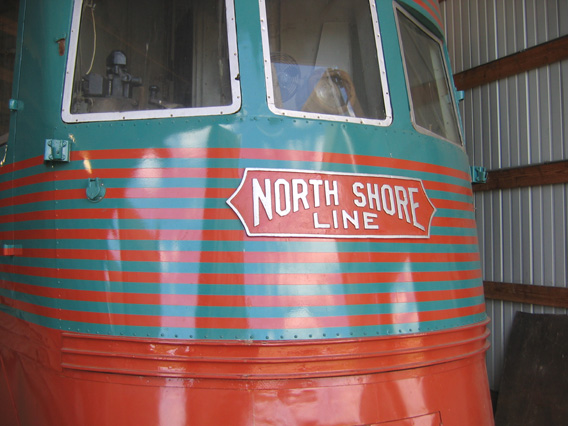
Front of 801-802, at the Illinois Railroad Museum.

Diagram of an Electroliner.

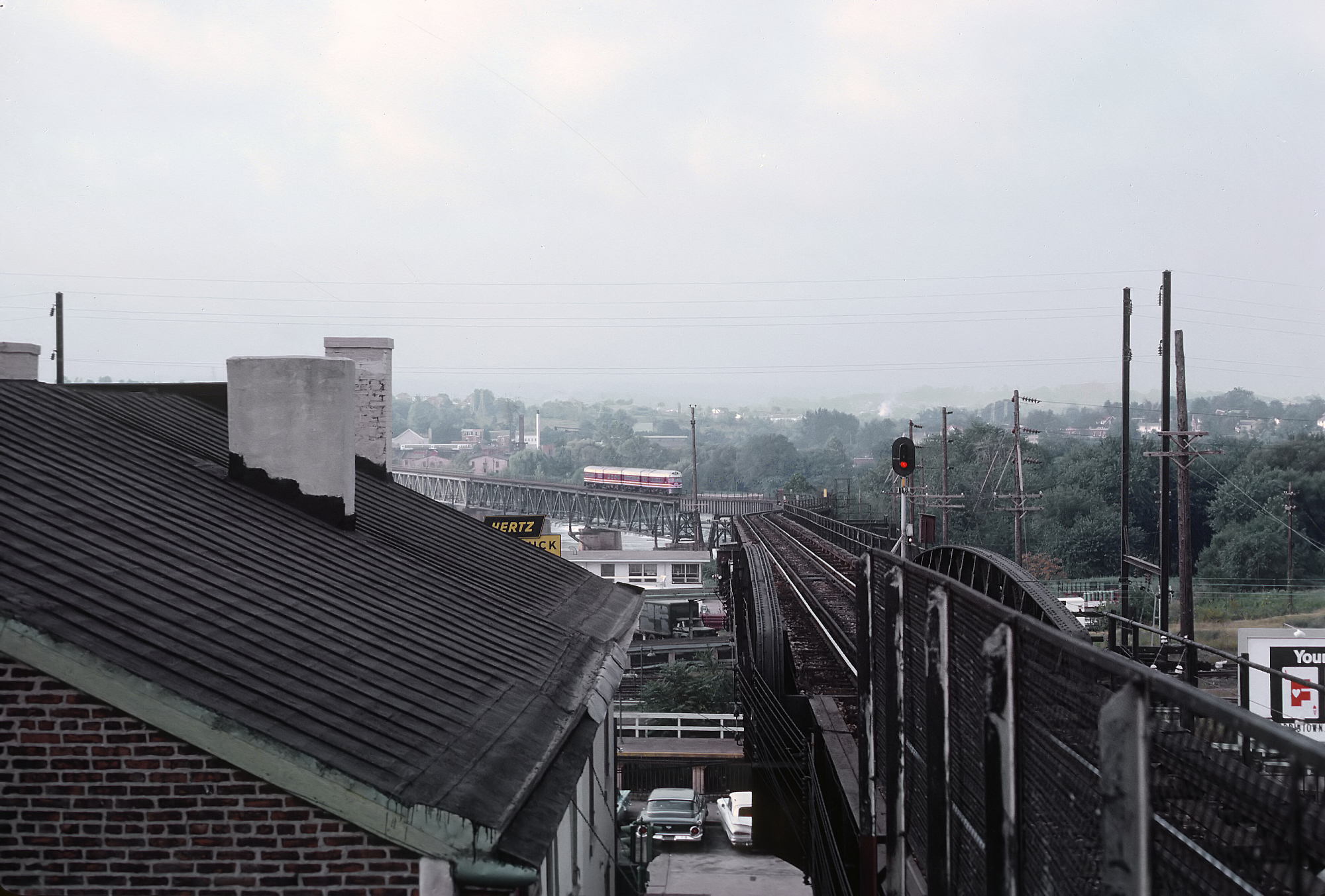
PSTC Libertyliner Independence Hall crossing the Schuylkill River at Norristown, PA August 28, 1964

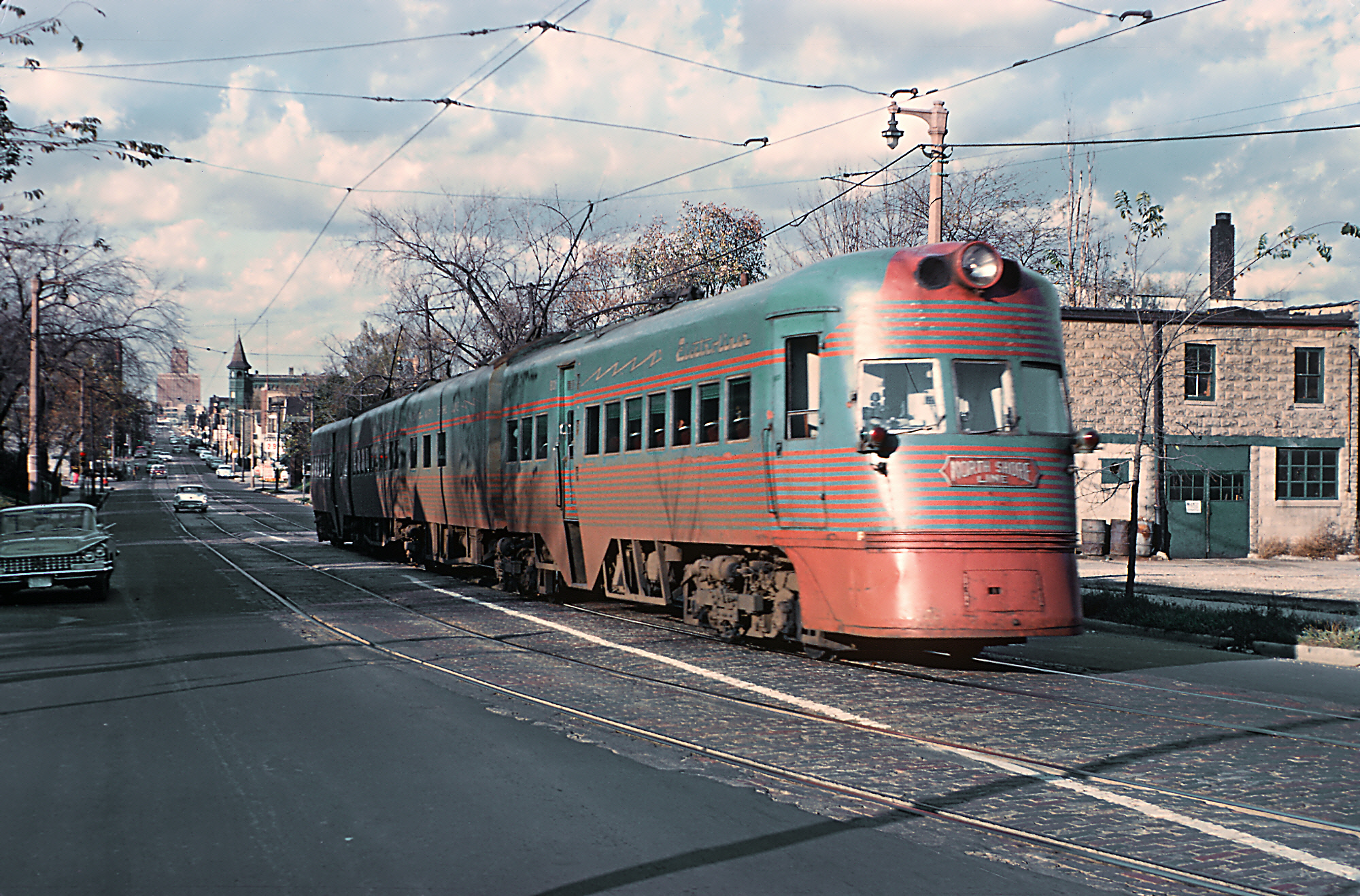
Electroliner on Milwaukee's Streets, October 1962

== See also ==
Streamliners (Illinois Terminal Railroad)
