= Motive power depot =

Rail yard for cleaning, repairing and maintaining locomotives

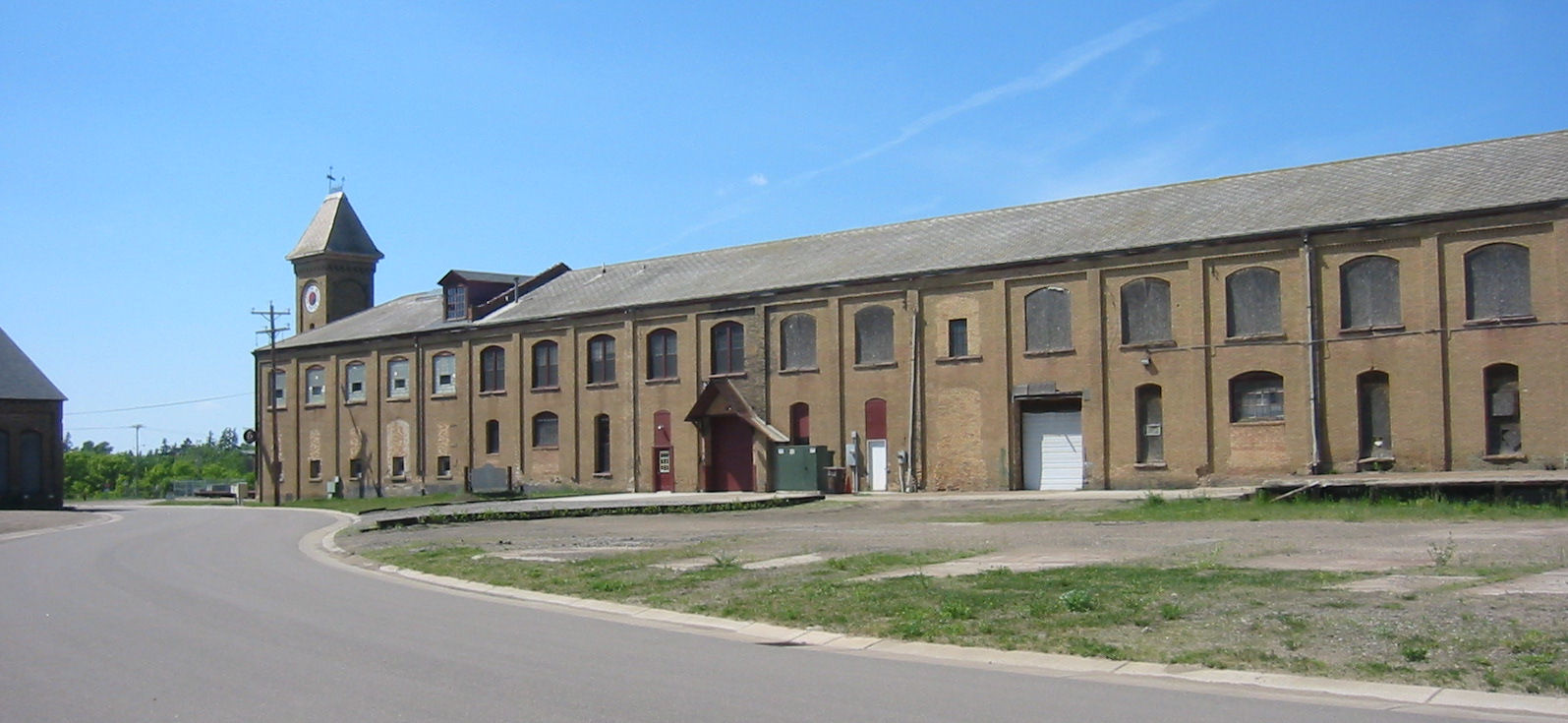
Northern Pacific Railroad Shops, Brainerd, Minnesota

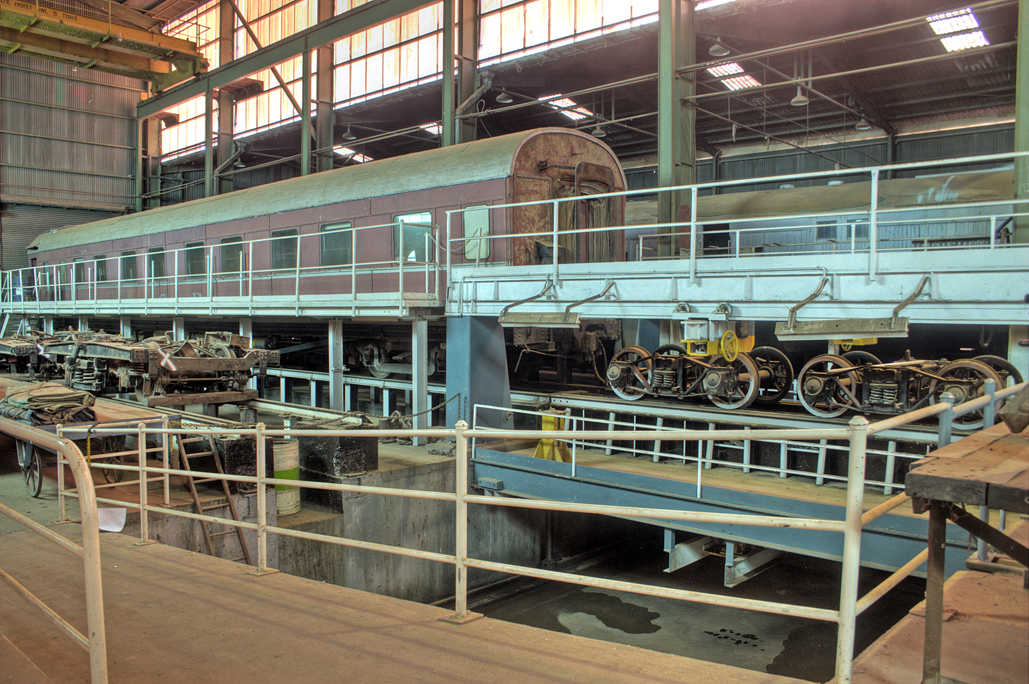
Inside a diesel shed, Peterborough, South Australia

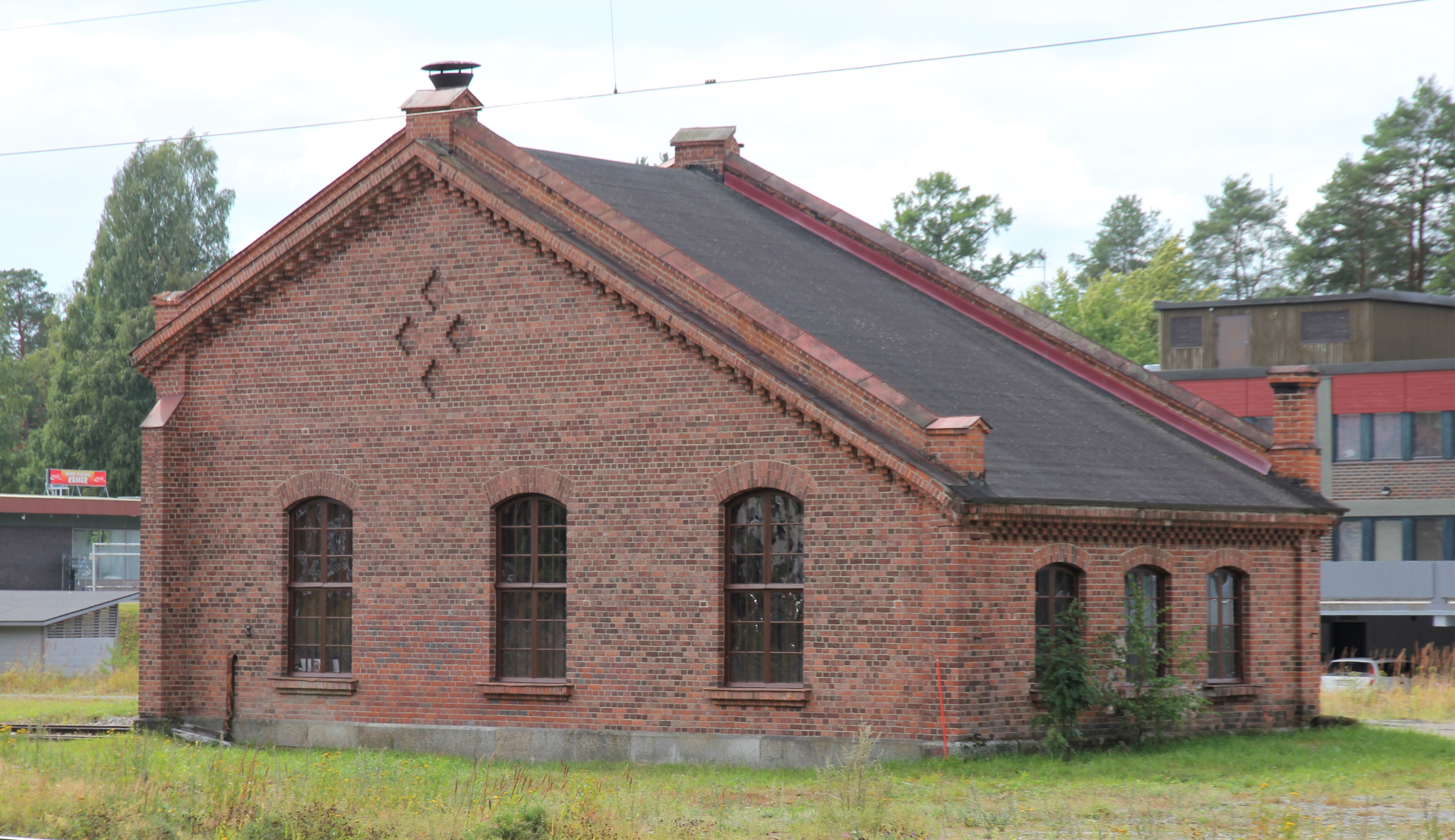
Old railway depot in Suonenjoki, Finland

A motive power depot (MPD) or locomotive depot, or traction maintenance depot (TMD), is where locomotives are usually housed, repaired and maintained. They were originally known as "running sheds", "engine sheds" or just "sheds". Facilities are provided for refuelling and the replenishing of water, lubricating oil and grease and, for steam engines, the disposal of ash. There are often workshops for day-to-day repairs and maintenance, but locomotive building and major overhauls are usually carried out at locomotive works. (Note: In American English, the term depot is used to refer to passenger stations or goods (freight) facilities, not to vehicle maintenance facilities.)

== German practice ==
The equivalent of such depots in German-speaking countries is the Bahnbetriebswerk or Bw, which has similar functions, with major repairs and overhauls being carried out at Ausbesserungswerke. The number of those was reduced drastically following the changeover from steam to diesel and electric traction, and most modern Bw in Germany are specialised depots, often responsible for a single locomotive class.

== Engine sheds in the steam era ==
Engine sheds could be found in many towns and cities, as well as in rural locations. They were built by the railway companies to accommodate the locomotives that provided their local train services. Each engine shed would have an allocation of locomotives that would reflect the duties carried out by that depot. Most depots had a mixture of passenger, freight and shunting locomotives, but some, such as Mexborough, had predominantly freight locomotives, reflecting the industrial nature of that area in South Yorkshire. Others, such as Kings Cross engine shed in London, predominantly provided locomotives for passenger workings.

Nearly all depots at that time had a number of shunting locomotives. Normally 0-4-0T or 0-6-0T tank engines, they would be allocated to shunting duties in goods yards, carriage sidings, goods depots and docks.

Many large rail connected industrial sites also had engine sheds, primarily using shunting locomotives.

=== Design ===
Each railway company had its own architectural design of engine shed, but there were three basic designs of sheds:

- Roundhouse – where the tracks would radiate from a turntable;
- Straight – a number of tracks that would be accessible from either end;
- Dead End – a number of sidings accessible from one end only.

The turntables for straight and dead end sheds were generally outside. Those in roundhouses could be inside, such as those at York in the UK, or outside, such as that at the East Broad Top Railroad & Coal Company in Rockhill, Pennsylvania, USA.

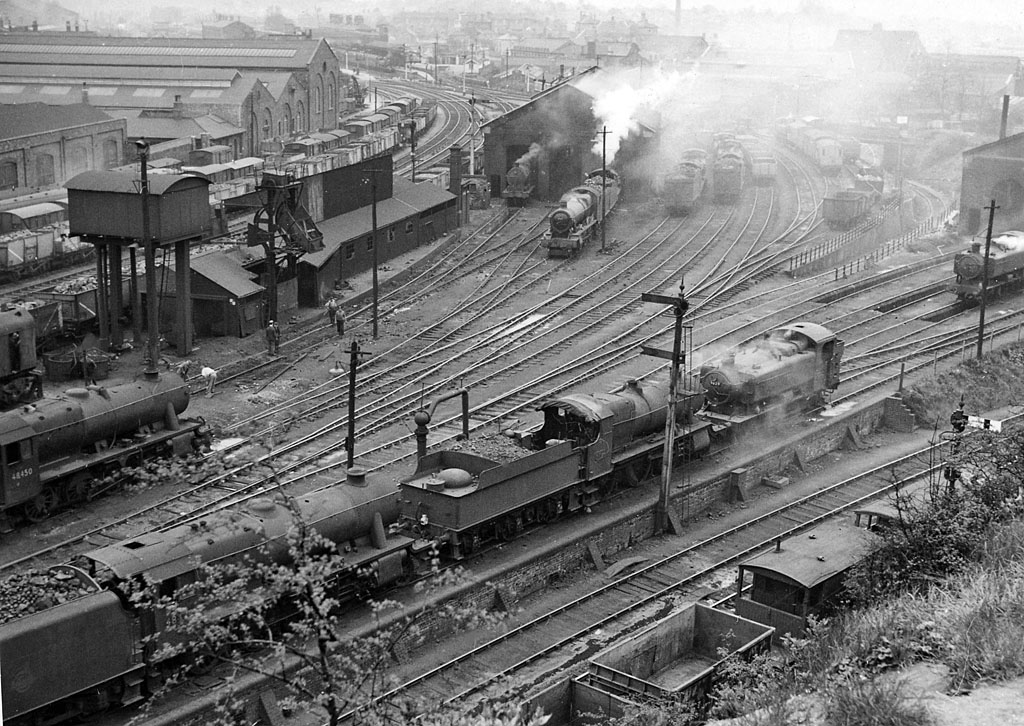
Worcester Locomotive Depot (UK) in April 1959

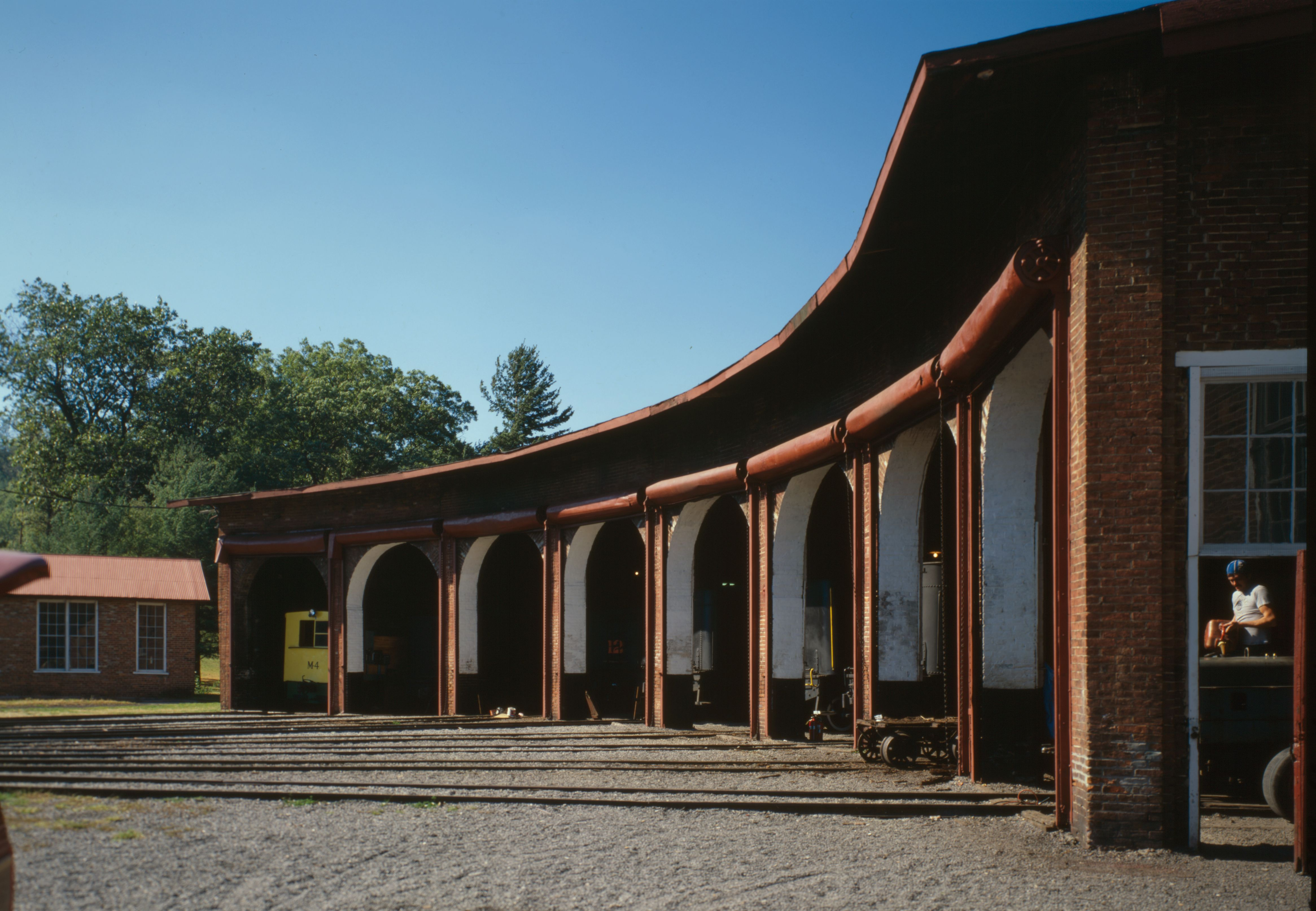
Roundhouse with outdoor turntable in Rockhill, Pennsylvania

=== Activity ===
There were six primary activities that took place at sheds.

==== Ash removal ====
When a steam engine arrived on shed, it would drop its fire and the ash that had built up would be removed. Disposal of the ash was a filthy job and carried out at quiet times, although some bigger depots had facilities for disposing of ash more efficiently. Study of photographs from the steam era shows it was not uncommon for piles of ash to be scattered around the depot site.

==== Boiler washout ====
After completing their last duty and arriving on shed, locomotives would have a regular boiler washout to remove scale, improve efficiency and protect safety.

==== Coaling ====
Locomotives generally ran on coal. Initially this job was done by hand and many depots had significant coal stacks on site. These would be neatly constructed with the outer walls constructed of dry blocks much in the style of a dry stone wall with smaller pieces behind these. As technology advanced and the bigger sheds got busier, this process became mechanised and huge coaling towers above the neighbourhoods indicated where the engine shed was. The sheds were not clean places to work. The large east London depot of Stratford had an engineman's dormitory and its occupants would "wake up with a layer of coal dust covering them and the bed".

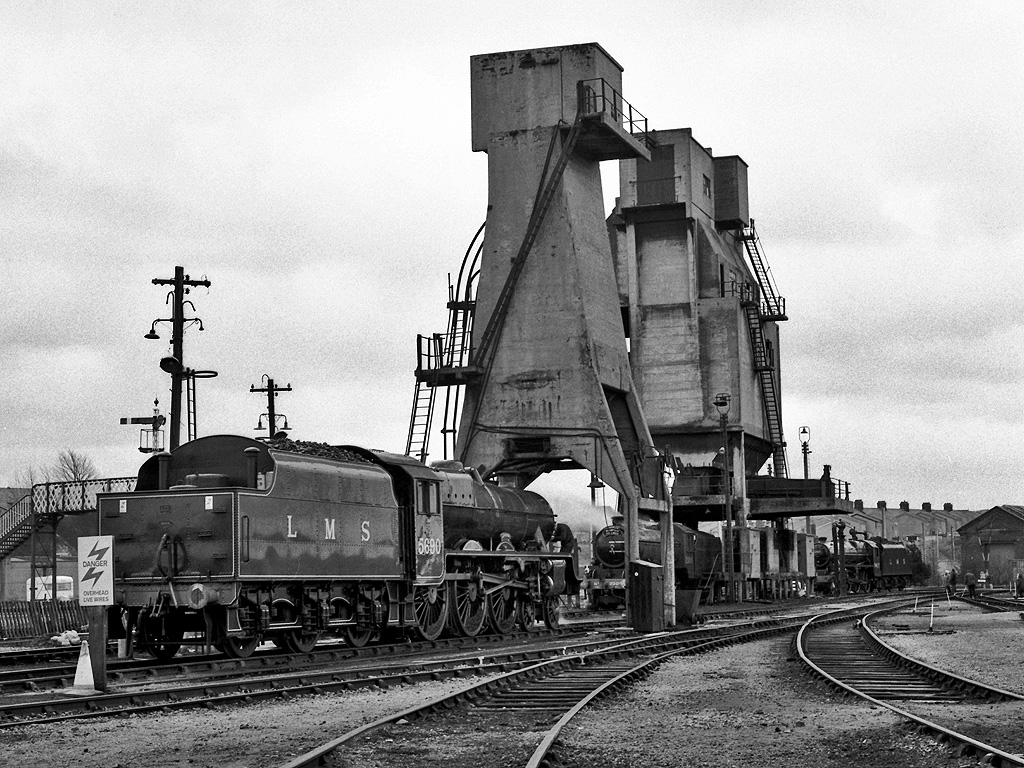
LMS 4-6-0 5690 LEANDER at Carnforth in the UK under the mechanical coaling tower.

==== Watering ====
Another key requirement of the steam engine is a supply of water which is carried in the tenders or tanks of the engines. In Australia, water was also carried in water gins (a water tank mounted on a wagon) due to longer distances covered and scarcer water resources. In depots where the limescale content of water was high (known in some areas as ‘Hard Water'), water softening plants were introduced. At Norwich engine shed in the UK, the sludge was discharged into a tank and emptied every three years or so with the sludge being dumped into the sea at Lowestoft.

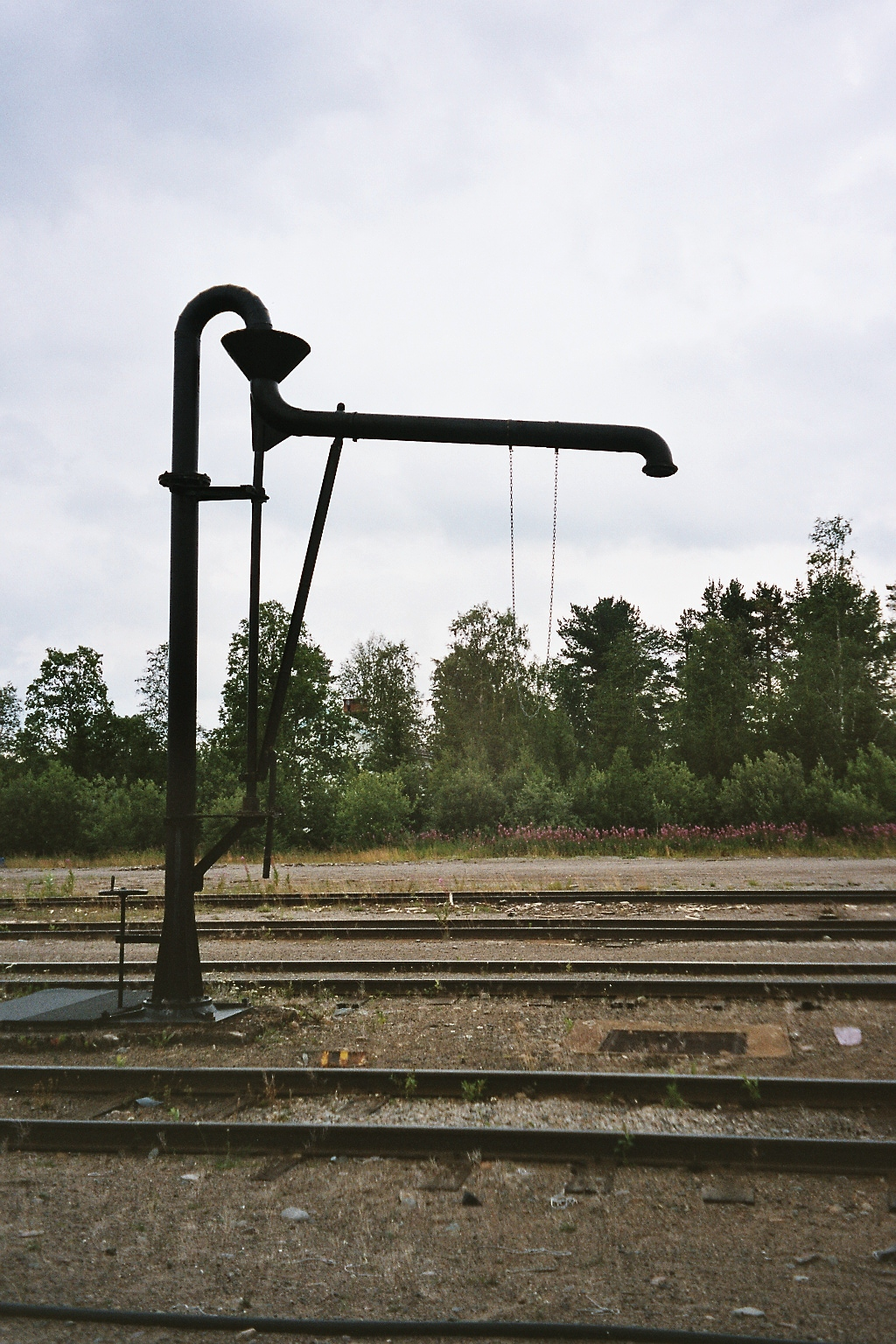
Inlandsbanan Water crane - similar cranes were found at engine sheds as well as stations.

==== Turning ====
Tender locomotives required turning so they were facing the right way before their next duty. In the early days, these were typically around 45 feet long. As the technology improved and engines got bigger, then the turntables got longer. In order to turn a locomotive the engine had to be balanced quite precisely on the turntable and it could then be literally pushed around.

Some turntables could be powered by fixing the vacuum brake of the engine to the turntable and using that to turn the engine.

Later turntables were electrically operated. Many diesel locomotives in the UK have a cab at each end removing the need for the turntables. However, in Australia and America, there are a number of single ended locomotives and turntables are still in use.

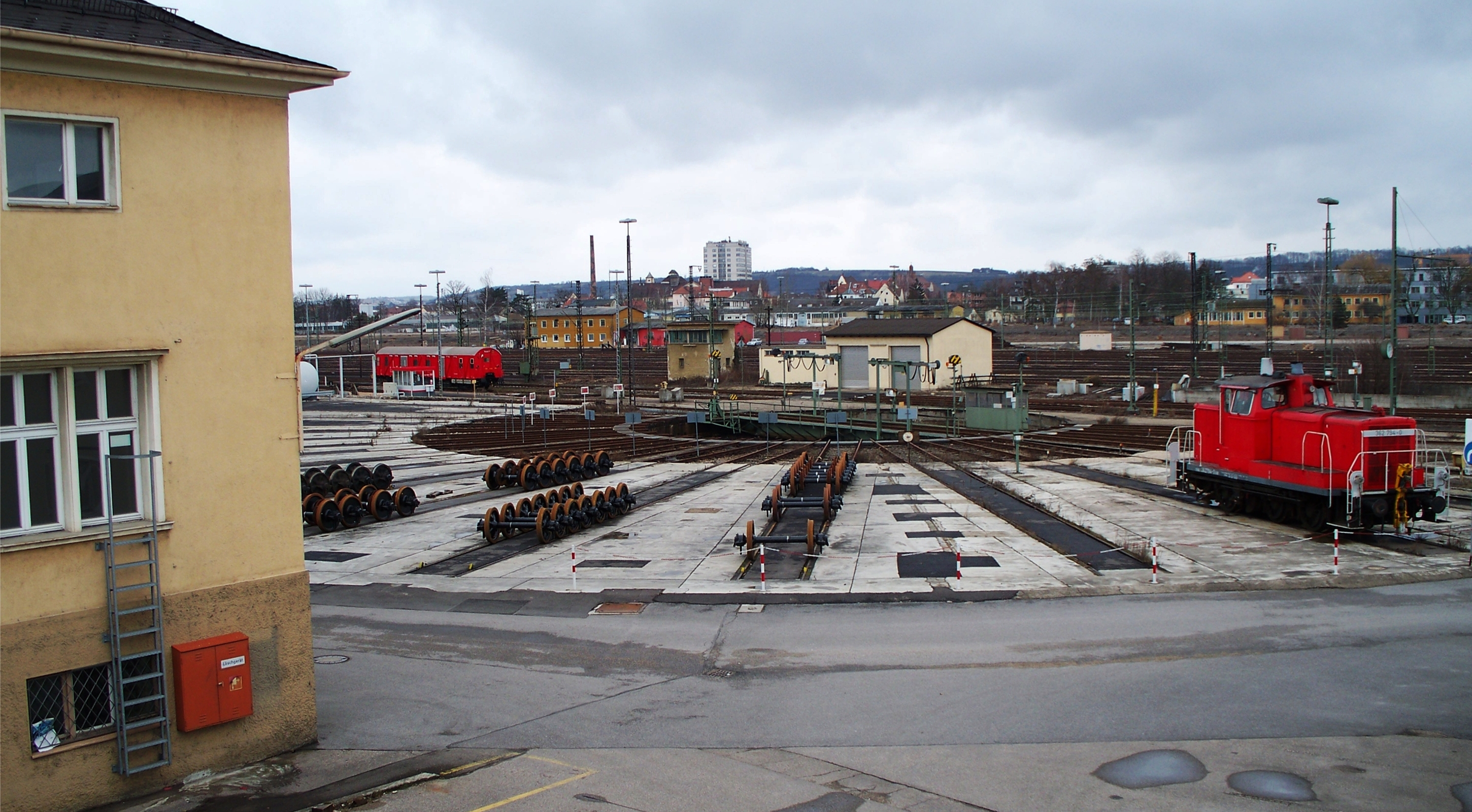
Rail turntable in Regensburg, Bavaria, Germany

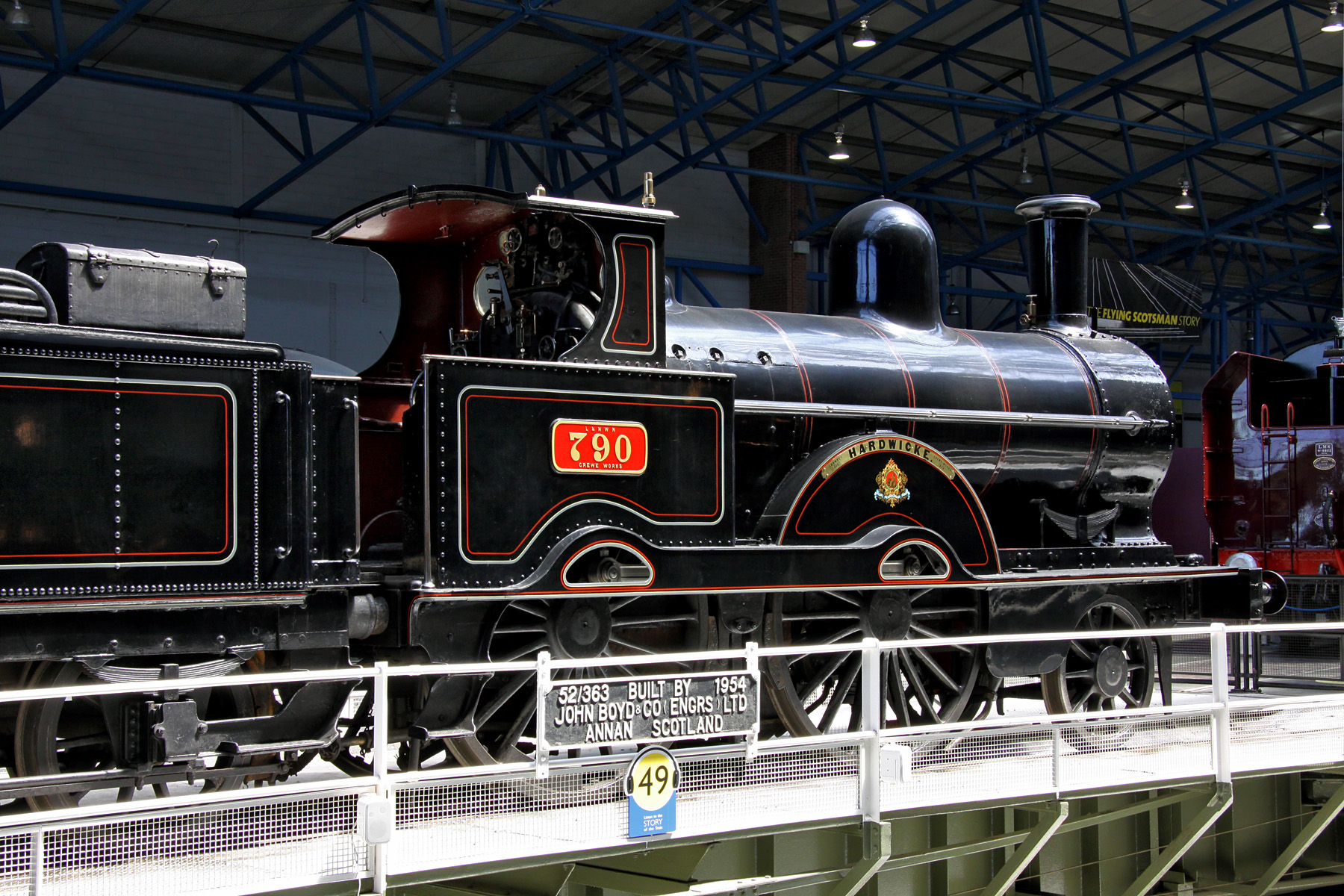
LNWR locomotive 790 Hardwicke on the National Railway Museum turntable in York, England

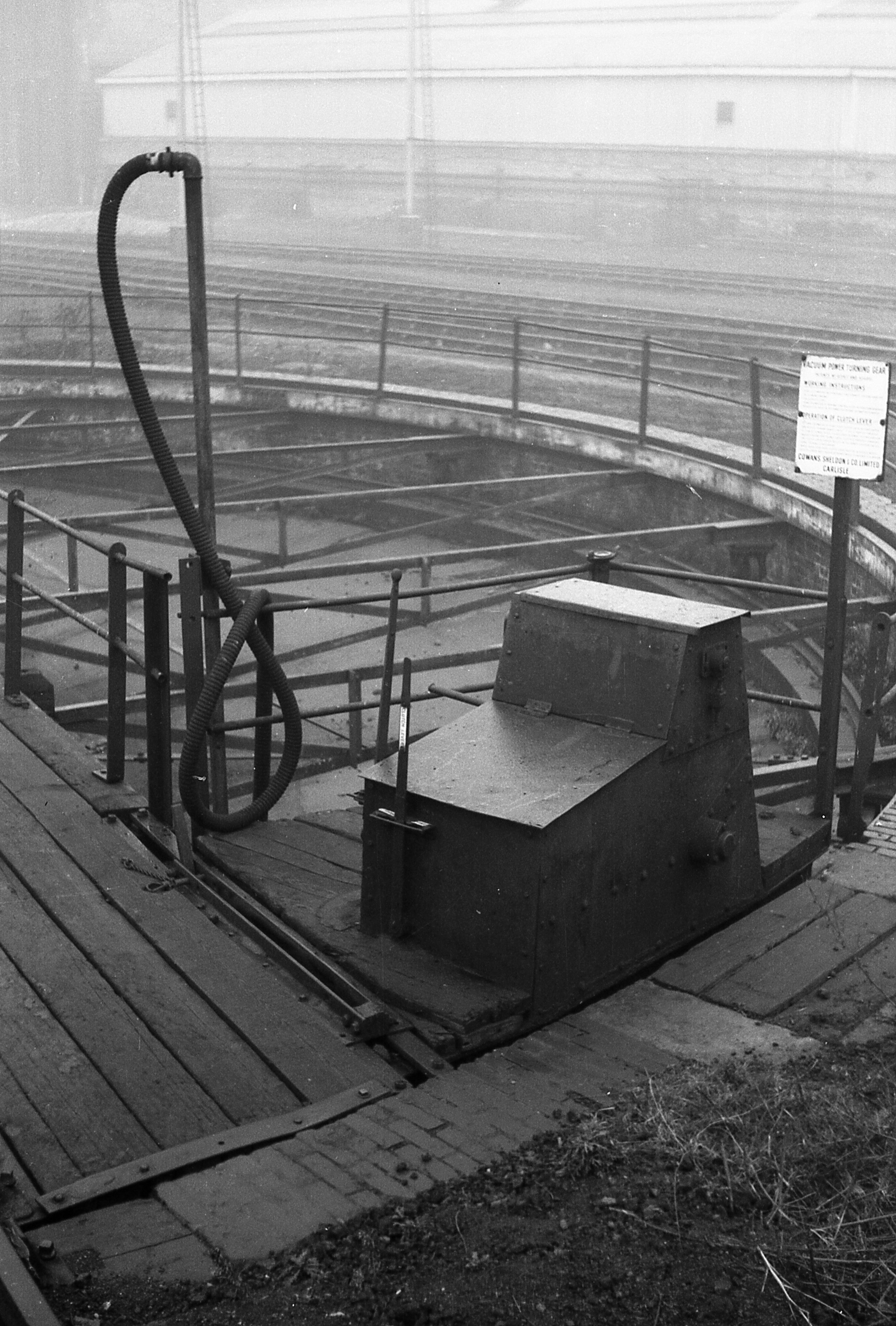
Details of the vacuum operating system

==== Repairs ====
Engine sheds would carry out basic maintenance and the bigger sheds would carry out more complex repairs. Locomotives that required further repair were sent to the company's locomotive works. Withdrawn locomotives could often be found at some depots before their final trips to the scrapyard.

=== Sub-shed ===
In the UK, the general practice is that one shed would have a number of smaller sub-sheds where there were fewer facilities. When engines allocated to sub-sheds required repairs, they were often exchanged for a similar engine or perhaps just visiting the main depot on a Sunday when traffic levels were considerably lower.

In terms of locomotive allocation, it seems to have been the practice that for some railways locomotives were all allocated to the main shed but in others each shed had its specific allocation of locomotives.

A list of the British sub-sheds can be found here.

=== Staff ===
The drivers and fireman were the visible face of the engine shed and, as such, certain sheds had reputations for clean locomotives thanks to the dedication of those men. Many companies allocated a specific main line locomotive to a crew and they would usually take a personal interest in the cleanliness of their engine; Some companies offered a prize to the crew of the best kept engine.

Many drivers would spend their own time on improving their knowledge and sharing best practice with younger drivers. The footplate staff (as drivers and fireman were known) were unionised from the 19th century and in the UK were generally in the ASLEF whilst other shed staff tended to be in the Amalgamated Society of Railway Servants (later National Union of Railwaymen).

Many engine shed workers put up with very poor conditions for many years. In the 1950s and 1960s, the rise of manufacturing industry saw many staff leaving the railway for better working conditions (and pay) and many railways started to modernise as a result.

== Engine sheds in the modern era ==
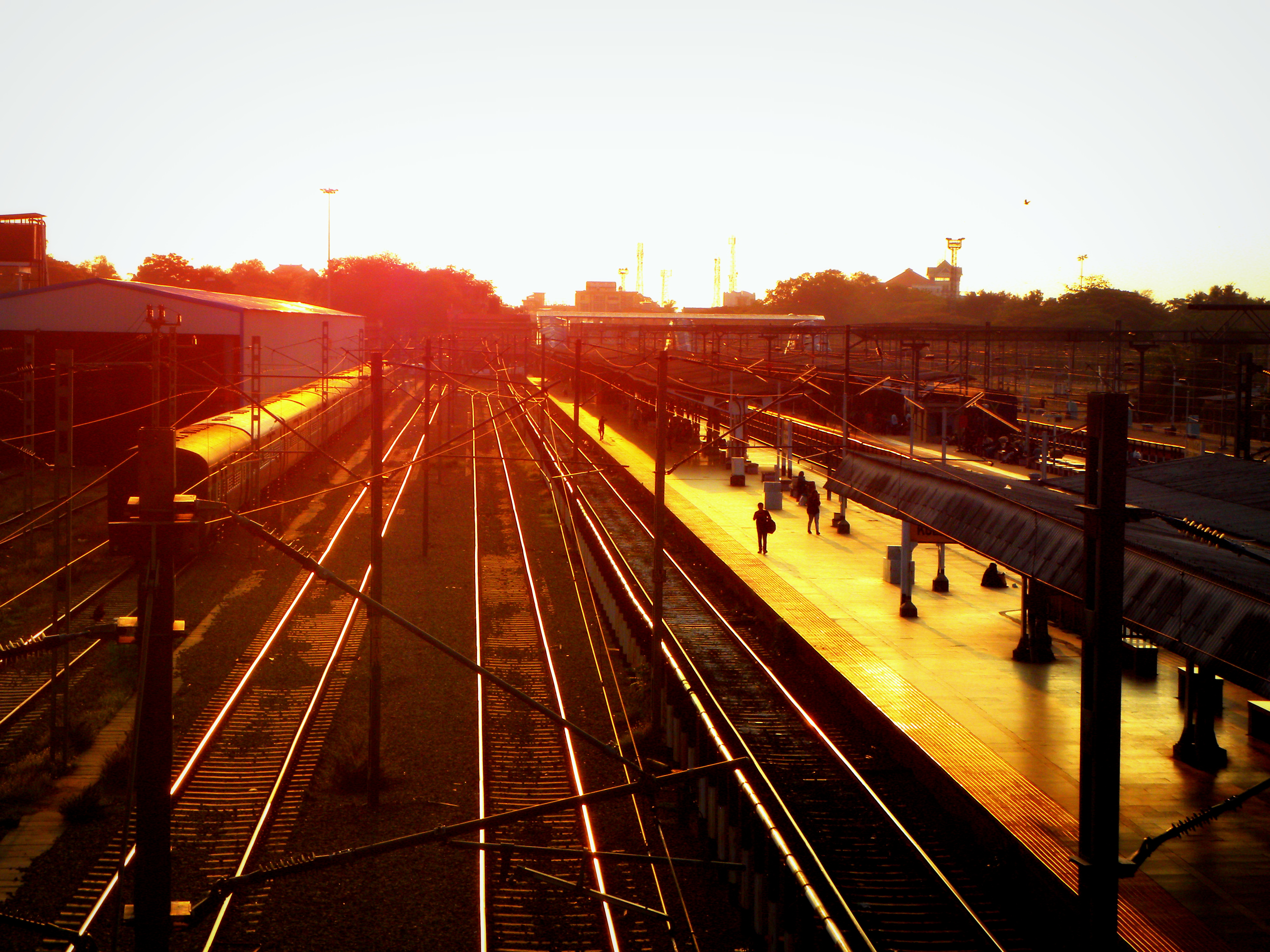
An evening view of Kollam Junction railway station and Kollam MEMU Shed, India

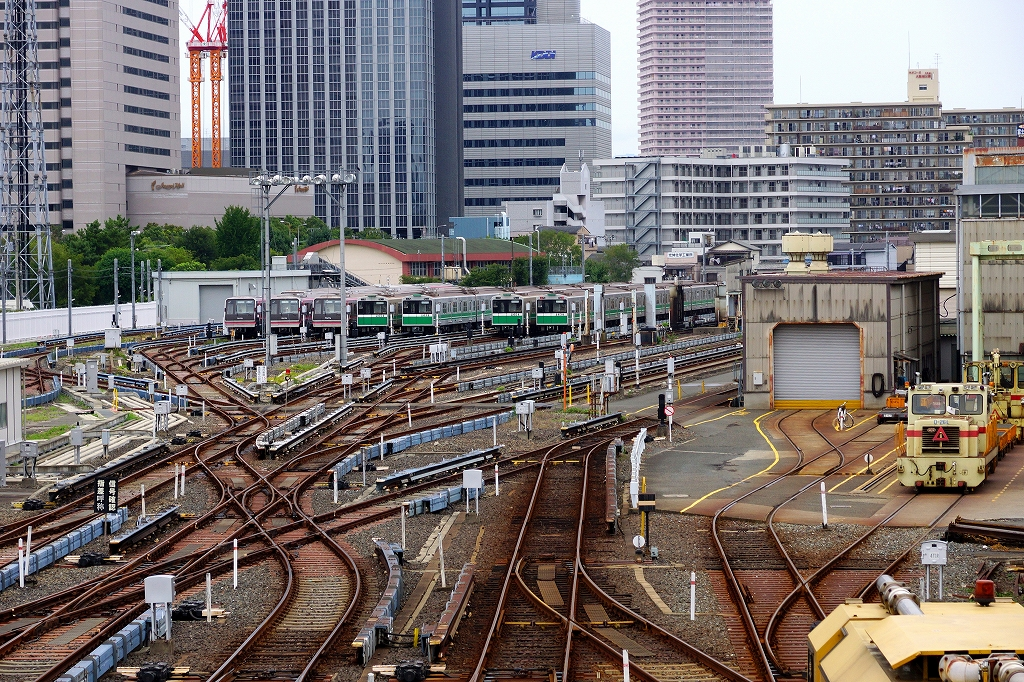
Morinomiya Depot on the Osaka Metro Chūō Line, a typical example of a third-rail subway depot. On the far right is the depot's shed for work trains with one such locomotive parked there

By the time of the Modernisation Plan, the maintenance of the new diesel locomotives in aged and often poorly maintained steam sheds proved difficult and, although some old sheds survived, many new diesel depots were built on new sites or on the sites of the old steam sheds. The major problem was the disposal of oil, which initially was left lying around causing pollution and safety issues. The new depots were equipped to deal with diesel fuel and the ability to access the underside, as well as upper body work, was improved.

The tasks were not that much different in that diesel locomotives were fuelled rather than coaled, although they did require water as early diesels were equipped with steam generators for train heating purposes.

Since the privatisation of British Rail, certain depots are now operated by the rolling stock manufacturers, such as Alstom and its Longsight Electric TMD, who maintain the trains under contract with train operators and lease the depot from Network Rail.

== Stabling and fuelling points ==
Around railway networks, there are locations just used for the coaling/fuelling of locomotives and the stabling of stock, either overnight or between duties. These are generally not regarded as engine sheds.

== See also ==
- Ausbesserungswerk
- Bahnbetriebswerk
- Bus garage
- Conservation and restoration of rail vehicles
- List of British Railways shed codes
- Roundhouse
- Ipswich engine shed
- Railway workshop
- Rail yard
- Stratford TMD
- York engine sheds and locomotive works
