= Robertsdale Historic District =

Historic district in Pennsylvania, US

- U.S. National Register of Historic Places
- U.S. Historic district
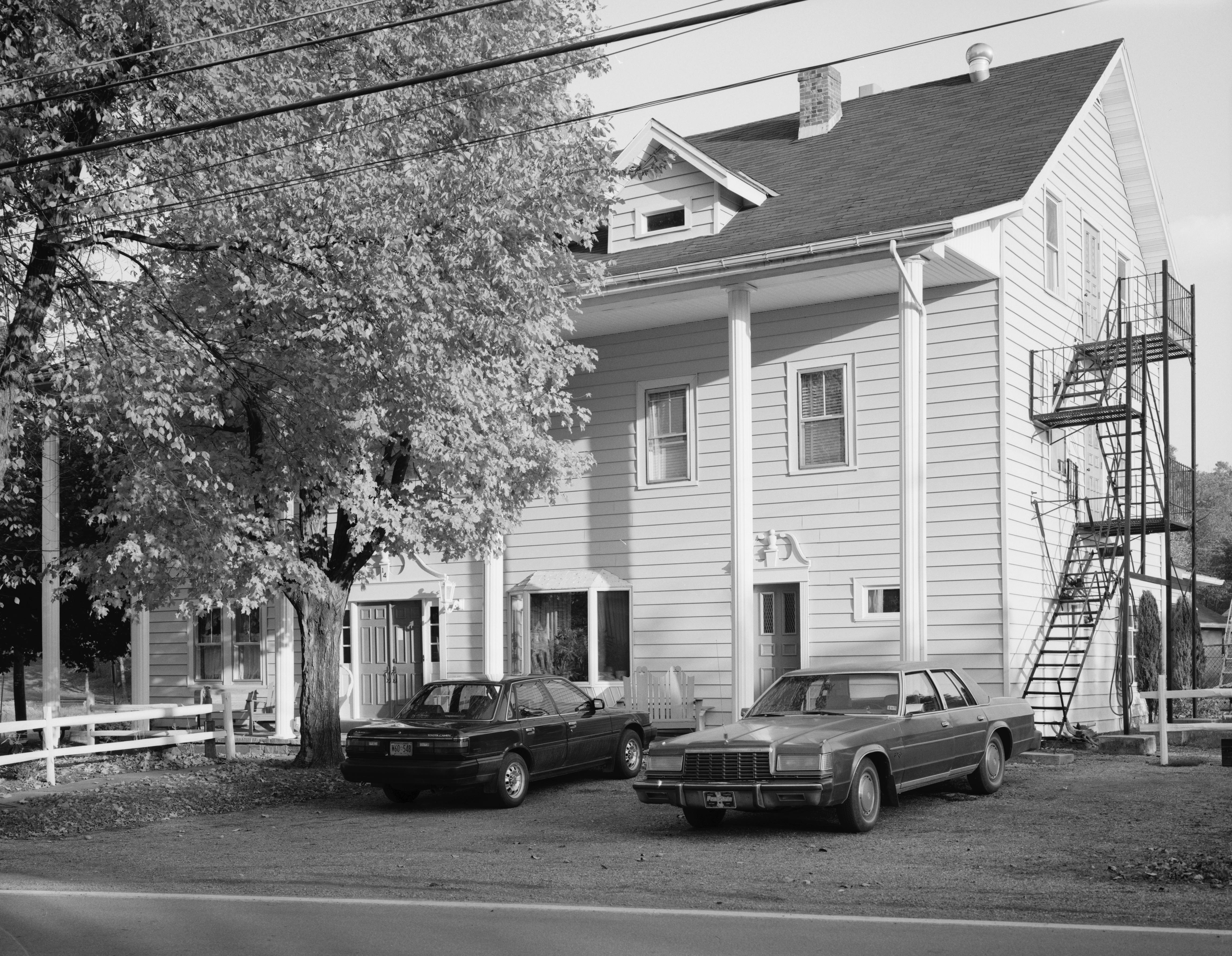
- Robertsdale Hotel, Autumn 1989

- Location within Pennsylvania Location within the United States
- Location: Roughly bounded by the USGS 1840 contour line and South Main, Wood, Lincoln, Cliff, and Cherry Streets, in Robertsdale, Wood Township, Pennsylvania
- Coordinates: 40°11′01″N 78°06′45″W
- Area: 81 acres (33 ha)
- Built: 1873
- Built by: Rockhill Iron and Coal Company
- MPS: Industrial Resources of Huntingdon County, 1780--1939 MPS
- NRHP reference No.: 92000391
- Added to NRHP: May 7, 1992

The Robertsdale Historic District is a national historic district that is located in Robertsdale in Wood Township, Huntingdon County, Pennsylvania.

It was listed on the National Register of Historic Places in 1992.

== History and architectural features ==
This district includes 102 contributing buildings and one contributing site. The buildings primarily date between circa 1873 and the 1920s and are associated with the development of the company town by the Rockhill Iron and Coal Company. They include the company office, a store, and a railway depot, along with workers' housing. Notable buildings include the company store (1873-1874), the Rockhill Iron and Coal Company office building (1914), the Robertsdale Post Office (c. 1915), the East Broad Top Railroad depot (1914), the Robertsdale Hotel (c. 1912), the Reality Theatre (1948), the McClain Store (1911-1923), a superintendent's house, (1896), the Methodist Parsonage (1922), Wood Township Elementary School (1934), and the Methodist Episcopal Church (1890s).
