= Robertsdale, Pennsylvania =

Unincorporated community in Pennsylvania, US

- Unincorporated community
- Location within Pennsylvania Location within the United States
- Coordinates: 40°10′59″N 78°06′50″W
- Country: United States
- State: Pennsylvania
- County: Huntingdon
- Township: Wood
- Founded: 1872
- Elevation: 539 m (1,768 ft)
- Time zone: UTC-5 (Eastern (EST))
  - Summer (DST): UTC-4 (EDT)
- Zip code: 16674
- Area code: 814
- GNIS feature ID: 2830888
- Local phone exchanges: 635

Robertsdale is an unincorporated community in Wood Township in southern Huntingdon County, Pennsylvania, United States. It is situated on Broad Top Mountain near the eastern slope.

== History ==
Map Of The Coal Mines In Robertsdale

The community was founded in 1872 as part of the construction of the East Broad Top Railroad and Coal Company as the original terminus and mining location. The town was created by the EBT's parent company, the Rockhill Iron and Coal Company, which operated most of the mines on the east side of the Broad Top Coal field. The initial focus of mining was the Houck Mine (renamed Rockhill Iron and Coal Mine #1) which antedated the town, though as a much smaller producer. Later, RI&C #5 became a large producer. Mines #2, #3 and #4 were in Robertsdale but were not large producers and operated only briefly. Later, the EBT was extended to Woodvale, Alvan and new Alvan as the focus of mining moved along the coal seams, though Robertsdale remained the mining headquarters. Robertsdale was a typical coal mining town, complete with company owned miner houses, a company store, a company owned water and power system and other company owned facilities. Coal mining and its support industries were the principal employers.

As coal demand declined after World War II, the deep mines began to close in favor of more economical strip mining. The last of the deep coal mines closed in the early 1950s. Mine #1 closed in 1951. As the demand for coal continued to slacken, RI&C shut down in 1956 along with the EBT and both were sold to the Kovalchick Salvage Company of Indiana, Pennsylvania. Limited deep mining resumed under contractors and contract surface mining continued into the 1990s. Limited surface mining resumed in the late 2000s.

Although the EBT ceased operations in 1956, the track and structures are still in place through Robertsdale. The station building is currently the museum for Friends of the East Broad Top, who also own the Rockhill Iron and Coal Company post office building but not the general offices. The Reality theater, which was built in 1948, just as the decline in coal demand started, and the former United Methodist Church, are now owned by the Broad Top Coal Miners Historical Society as their Broad Top Coal Miners Museum and Entertainment Center. In the wake of the RI&C sale and the end of large scale mining, most miner homes were sold off by their occupants. The EBT continued to operate and maintain the ancient water system until it was replaced by a new municipal system in the 1990s.

The Robertsdale Historic District was listed on the National Register of Historic Places in 1992.

== Demographics ==
Historical population
Census	Pop.	Note	%±

The United States Census Bureau defined Robertsdale as a census designated place (CDP) in 2023.

== Points of interest ==
- Broad Top Coal Miners Museum and Entertainment Center
