= Broad Top Area Coal Miners Museum =

Coordinates: 40.181088°N 78.116452°W

- Location: 105 Church Street; Robertsdale, Pennsylvania 16674
- Type: Historical/Museum/Library
- Website: https://broadtopminersmuseum.com/

The Broad Top Area Coal Miners Museum is a museum documenting the history of the isolated Broad Top coalfield in south central Pennsylvania. The museum is operated by the Broad Top Area Coal Miners Historical Society; its president is with Ron Morgan, the museum curator. The Museum and entertainment center was originally housed in the Reality Theater in Robertsdale, Pennsylvania, which the group purchased in 1991 and opened in 1992. In 2008 the museum moved to the former Methodist church in Robertsdale, Pennsylvania while the entertainment center remained in the theater.

The museum complex contains a large collection of mining memorabilia about the Broad Top Coal Field. The museum also contains a vast collection of the Huntingdon and Broad Top Railroad memorabilia and has most of the archives for the H&BT.
