= Streamliners (Illinois Terminal Railroad) =

American streamlined electric multiple units

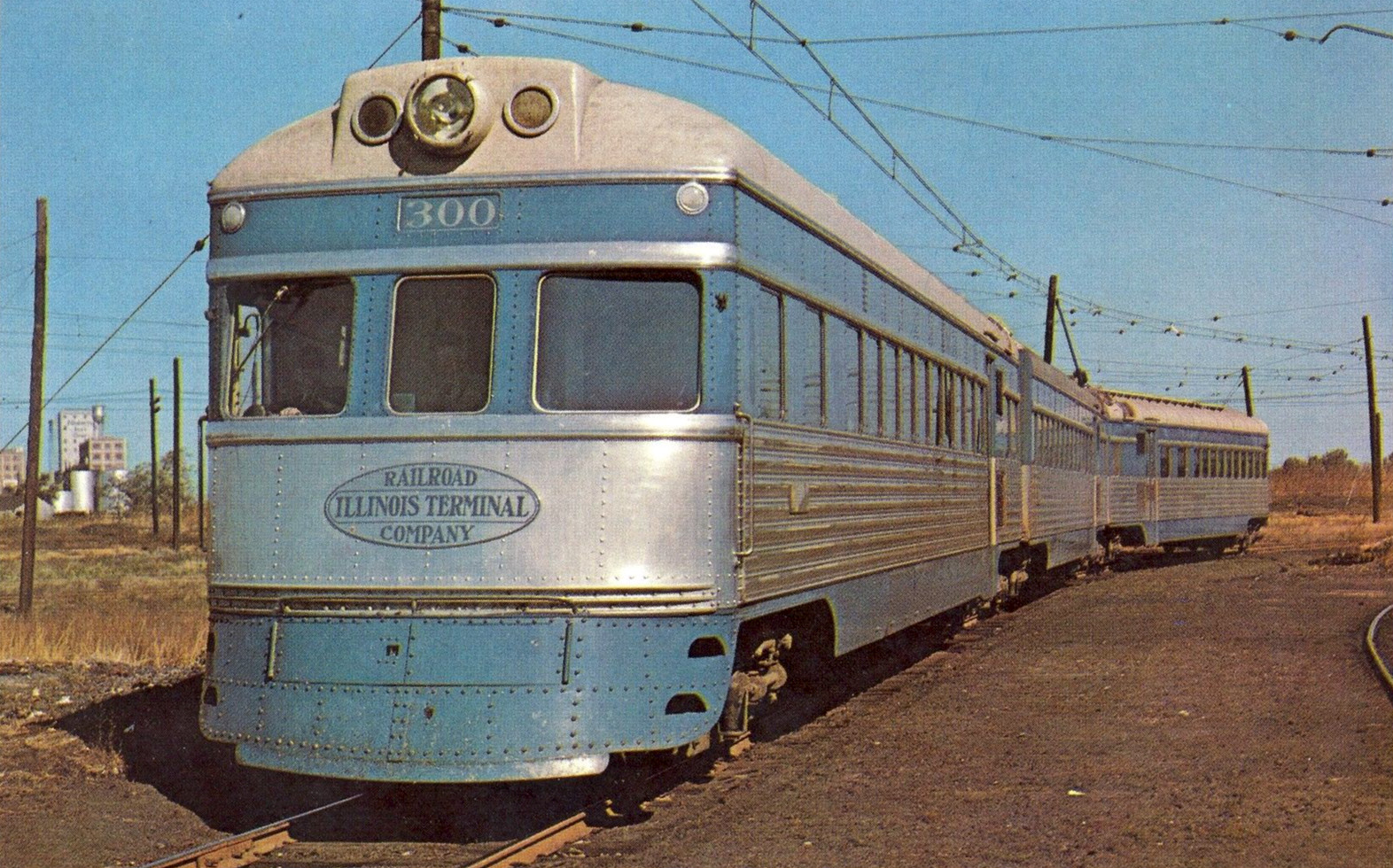
- ITC No. 300, one of the three streamliners

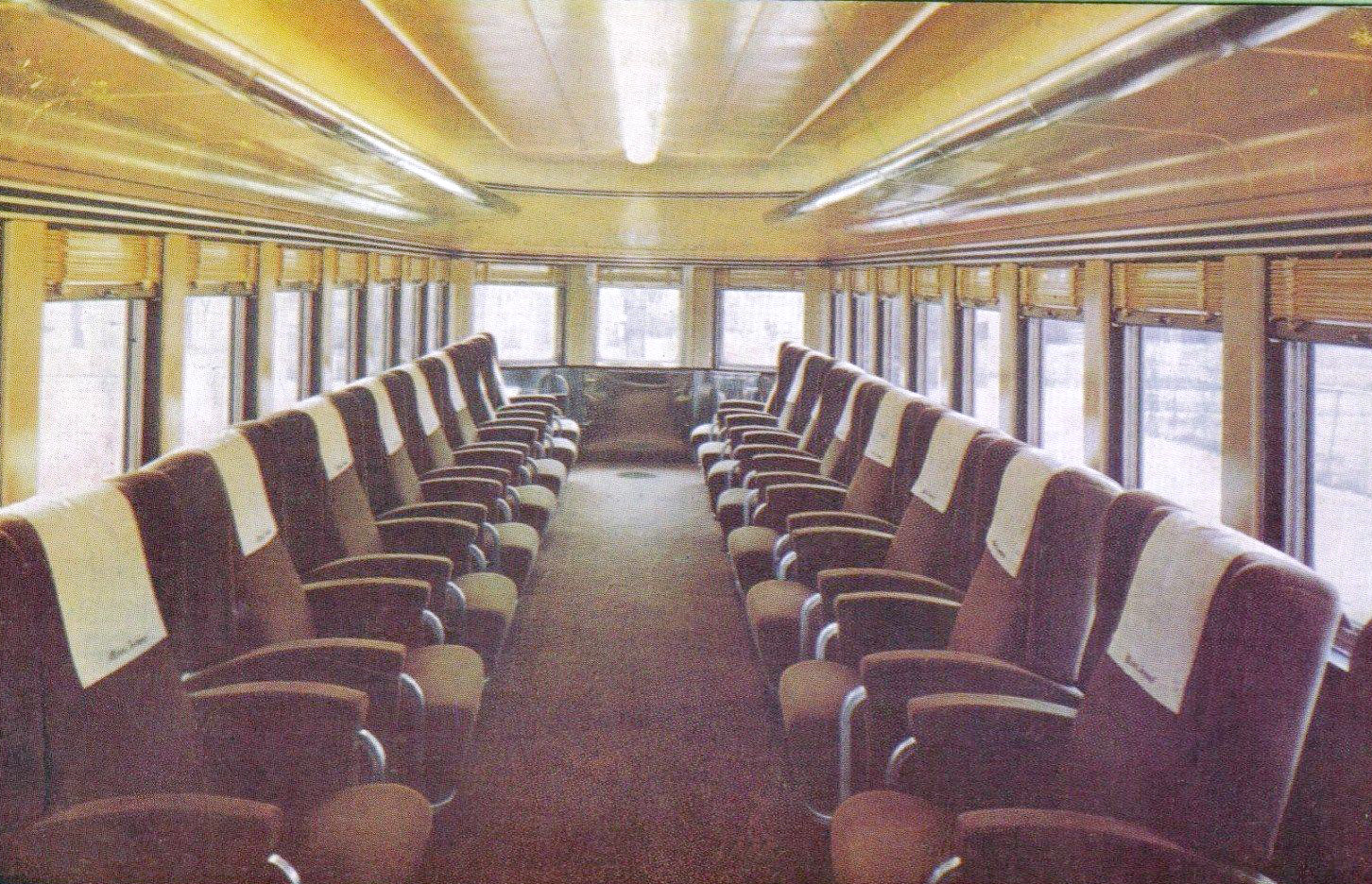
- Coach interior
- In service: 1948–1956
- Manufacturer: St. Louis Car Company
- Number built: 3
- Number preserved: 0
- Number scrapped: 3
- Formation: 3-car set
- Operator: Illinois Terminal Railroad

Specifications
- Car body construction: Aluminium
- Maximum speed: 80 miles per hour (130 km/h)
- Traction system: Electric
- Traction motors: 4 × GE 1240A2
- Power output: 4 × 140 horsepower (100 kW)
- Electric systems: Overhead line, 600 V DC
- Current collection: Trolley pole
- Bogies: General Steel Castings
- Track gauge: 4 ft 8 1/2 in (1,435 mm) standard gauge

The Streamliners were a fleet of three streamlined electric multiple units built by the St. Louis Car Company for the Illinois Terminal Railroad in 1948–1949. They operated primarily between St. Louis, Missouri and Peoria, Illinois in the late 1940s and early to mid-1950s. They were the last interurban cars manufactured in the United States.

== Design ==
The St. Louis Car Company constructed all three sets. Each equipment set comprised three cars. The cars were constructed of fluted aluminum and were painted in a royal blue paint scheme.

Each car was independently powered by four General Electric 1240A2 traction motors, each producing 140 horsepower (100 kW), enabling a top speed of 80 miles per hour (130 km/h). These traction motors were supplied with traction current via overhead wires, reaching the unit through a trolley pole.

The twin axle bogies for the sets were manufactured by General Steel Castings.

== Service ==
The streamliners represented a last attempt by the Illinois Terminal to regain lost passenger traffic and were the first new passenger cars the railroad had ordered since 1918. The Illinois Terminal began teasing the new streamliners in 1947, but did not announce the order until May 1948. Its original plan was to place all three in service between St. Louis and Peoria. The first new train in service was the City of Decatur, which began operating between St. Louis, Missouri and Decatur, Illinois (not Peoria) on November 7, 1948. It was the first through service offered by the Illinois Terminal between those two cities.

By March 1950 all three sets were in operation. The other two, the Fort Crevecoeur and Mound City, were on the St. Louis–Peoria route as originally planned. All three trains offered parlor and "À la carte" dining service. The two streamliners made the trip in 4 hours 40 minutes, forty minutes faster than conventional interurbans on the route. Poor patronage led the Illinois Terminal to withdraw the City of Decatur in August 1950; the equipment was reassigned to the Peoria run. The new service was named Sangamon, which was the railroad's original choice in 1947.

All three sets were withdrawn by 1956 when passenger service on the Illinois Terminal ended and were eventually scrapped.

== See also ==
- Electroliner
