= East Broad Top Railroad and Coal Company =

Historic railroad in Pennsylvania

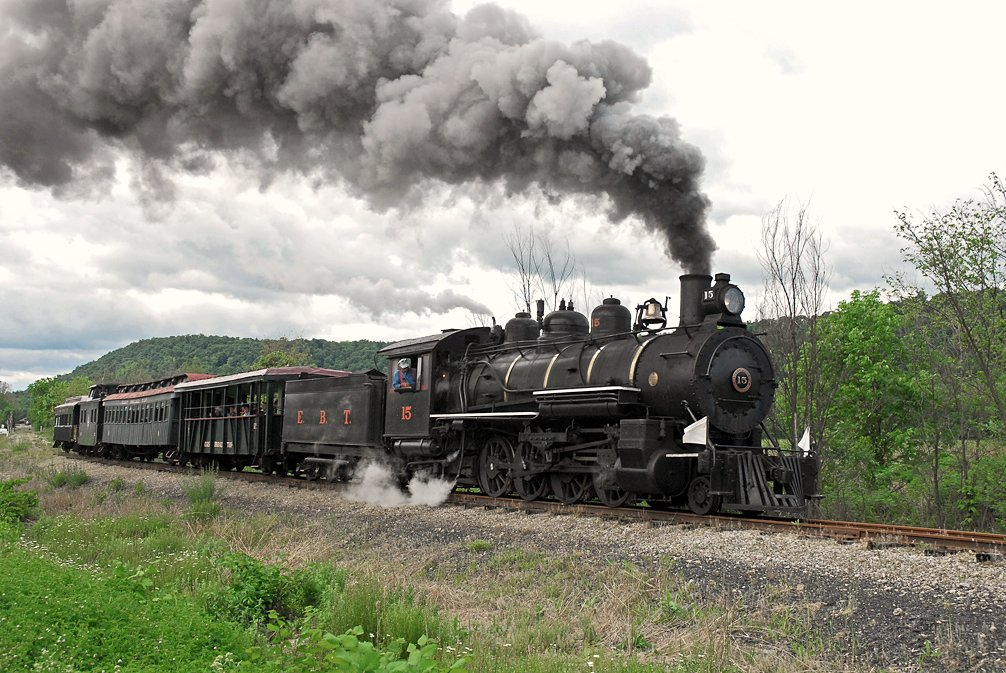
- EBT No. 15 hauling an excursion train, 2006

Overview
- Headquarters: Rockhill Furnace, Pennsylvania
- Reporting mark: EBT
- Locale: Huntingdon County, Pennsylvania
- Dates of operation: 1872–1956; 1960–2011; 2020–present

Technical
- Track gauge: 3 ft (914 mm)
- Length: 33 miles (53 km)

Other
- Website: eastbroadtop.com

- East Broad Top Railroad
- U.S. National Register of Historic Places
- U.S. National Historic Landmark District
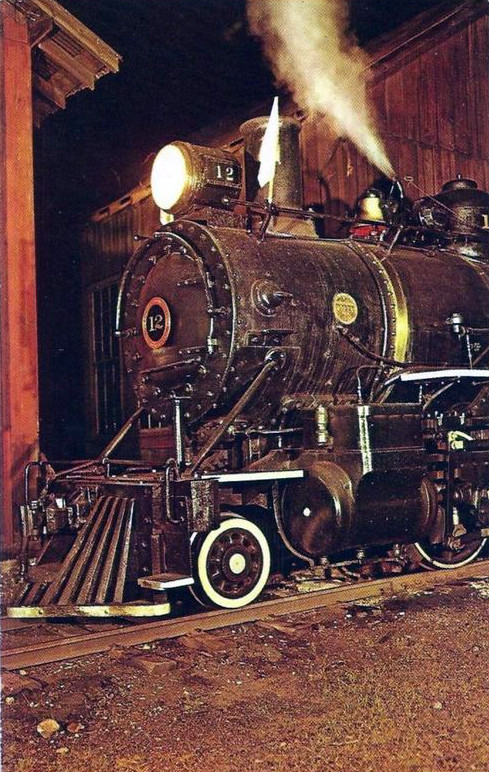
- EBT Engine 12 after the railroad was re-opened in 1960.
- Nearest city: Rockhill Furnace, Pennsylvania
- Coordinates: 40°14′29″N 77°53′56″W
- Area: 500 acres (200 ha)
- NRHP reference No.: 66000666

Significant dates
- Added to NRHP: October 15, 1966
- Designated NHLD: January 28, 1964

The East Broad Top Railroad (reporting mark EBT) is a 3 ft (914 mm) narrow gauge historic and heritage railroad headquartered in Rockhill Furnace, Pennsylvania.

Operating from 1871 to 1956, it is one of America's oldest and best-preserved narrow-gauge railroads, and was designated a National Historic Landmark in 1964. The railroad was preserved for use as a tourist attraction until operations ceased in 2011. In February 2020, after a nine-year closure, it was announced that the railroad had been purchased by a non-profit foundation and regular train services resumed in the summer of 2021.

== History ==
=== Importance as narrow-gauge railroad ===
The EBT is unusual in that it is a complete, original railroad rather than a collection of pieces from various locations, as most tourist railroads are. All six of the 3 ft (914 mm) narrow-gauge steam locomotives that operated on the railroad in its last years as a coal hauler are still on site, and some were used for the excursion trains. Other original equipment includes the M-1, a motorcar (doodlebug) based on scaled-down J. G. Brill and Company plans built by the EBT in 1927. The majority of rolling stock that operated on the railroad in its later coal-hauling years remains on the property in varying condition, including over a dozen flatcars, several boxcars and well over 150 hoppers. Tourist trains used original EBT passenger equipment, as well as converted EBT freight cars.

The original railroad maintenance shops have a pair of Babcock & Wilcox boilers, a 19th-century stationary steam engine, and an overhead line shaft system (steel shafts, wood and iron pulleys and leather and canvas belts) that powers antique machine tools, sheet-forming machines, foundry equipment, blacksmithing tools and woodworking machines. Almost 33 miles (53 km) of the railroad's original line is still in place, though only 8 miles (13 km) are usable. In recent years, disused trackage from Rockhill Furnace southward and Robertsdale southward have been cleared and gauged for use with speeders and handcars (track-gang cars).

The EBT was designated a National Historic Landmark in 1964 and added to the National Register of Historic Places in 1966. The railroad was added in 1996 to the National Trust for Historic Preservation's list of America's Most Endangered Places.

=== Common carrier operations - 1872 to 1956 ===
The East Broad Top Railroad and Coal Company was chartered in 1856. Due to financial constraints and the American Civil War, the railroad was not built by its original charterers, but a new group of investors began to acquire right-of-way in 1867 and was able to construct the railroad as a 3 ft (914 mm) narrow gauge line in 1872–1874. Services began from Mount Union, Pennsylvania to Orbisonia, Pennsylvania in August, 1873, and to Robertsdale in November, 1874. The line later was extended to Woodvale and Alvan, with several short branches. At its height, it had over 60 mi (97 km) of track and approximately 33 mi (53 km) of main line.

EBT trackage, connections, and facilities.

Branch Lines of the East Broad Top Railroad
| Name | Stations | Milepost | In service | Out of service |
|---|---|---|---|---|
| Clay spur | | | 1918 | 1927 |
| Shade Gap Branch | Blacklog | 12.5 | 1884 | 1956 |
| | Cedar Rock | 14.8 | 1884 | 1956 |
| | Locke Valley | 15.6 | 1884 | 1956 |
| | Shade Gap | 17.0 | 1884 | 1948 |
| | Neelyton | 20.2 | 1903 | 1943 |
| | Stanton spur | 21.6 | 1919 | 1940 |
| Shade Valley Branch | Stair | | 1886 | 1904 |
| | Goshorn | | 1888 | 1904 |
| | Nandy | | 1890 | 1902 |
| Booher Branch | | 15.0 | 1891 | 1912 |
| Narco Branch | | | 1942 | 1956 |
| Coles Valley Branch | Joller | | 1916 | 1948 |
| Rocky Ridge Branch | Curfman | 27.6 | 1905 | 1936 |
| | Jacobs | 29.0 | 1917 | 1936 |
| | Evanston | 30.4 | 1917 | 1936 |
| No. 7 and 8 spurs | | | 1915 | c. 1941 |

The primary purpose of the railroad was to haul semi-bituminous coal from the mines on the east side of the remote Broad Top Mountain plateau. In its first few decades, the railroad hauled most of the coal to Rockhill to be coked and used in iron production in the furnaces of the Rockhill Iron and Coal Company, its sister company. It then hauled the pig iron from the furnace. Shortly after the turn of the 20th century, the railroad transitioned to haul most of the coal to Mount Union to be processed and transferred to the Pennsylvania Railroad. The railroad also carried substantial amounts of ganister (orthoquartzite rock, used for furnace lining), lumber and passengers with some agricultural goods, concrete, road tar and general freight.

As the iron industry in the region faded in the early 20th century, the railroad came to subsist on coal traffic for about 90% of its revenue. Around the turn of the 20th century, large plants for the manufacture of silica brick were developed at Mount Union, and they became major customers for coal and also for ganister rock, which was quarried at multiple points along the railroad. At Mount Union, the yard consisted of dual gauge trackage. EBT had an engine house for two standard gauge locomotives which handled switching between the standard and narrow gauge sides of the coal cleaning plant.

The EBT maintained an office in Philadelphia, PA. An 1893 timetable lists its executive offices at 320 Walnut St., then the main commercial area of the city. The city's business center migrated west and by 1939 the EBT's office was at 1421 Chestnut St.

In 1929, the EBT expanded its passenger service by forming the East Broad Top Transit Company and operated regional bus service. It acquired the Mount Union Bus Line in 1931. In 1941, that operation was sold to the Huntingdon Bus Company.

EBT was generally profitable from the 1880s through the 1940s, and was able to modernize its infrastructure far more than other narrow gauge railroads. The railroad's roundhouse was built in 1882, and is one of the oldest railroad roundhouses in the US still in operation. A coal cleaning plant and a full maintenance shops complex were also built, bridges were upgraded from iron and wood to steel and concrete, wooden rolling stock was replaced by steel, and modern high-powered steam locomotives were bought from the Baldwin Locomotive Works of Philadelphia. In November 1953, the railroad's innovation earned them a cover story, "Is It a Sin to be Narrow Gauge?", in Trains magazine.

In the post-WWII years, most railroads converted to diesel motive power. Sources differ on why the EBT did not. One source cited the proven longevity of steam locomotives and, because EBT was a coal carrier, fuel was abundant and cheap. The other source is a 1955 General Electric Company report which argued that substantial savings in fuel, maintenance, and labor could be had by dieselization. However, by that time coal demand was already plummeting as homes and industries switched to cheap oil and gas. The last nail in the coffin came when the silica brick plants in Mount Union converted to oil and gas, meaning that not enough coal could be sold to support the mines and the railroad. On April 14, 1956, the railroad closed as a coal hauler and, along with the coal-mining company, was sold for scrap to the Kovalchick Salvage Corporation.

=== First heritage operation - 1960 to 2011 ===
Nick Kovalchick, president of Kovalchick Salvage, elected not to scrap the railroad right away, instead letting it sit in place. In 1960, the twin boroughs of Orbisonia and Rockhill Furnace—the latter being the operating hub for the railroad—celebrated their Bicentennial and asked Kovalchick to put a train out for display. Doing them one better, he rehabilitated four miles of track and two locomotives and operated tourist train rides for several months that summer. The new attraction was so successful that the ride, extended to five miles (8 km), opened as a regular tourist operation in 1961. The railroad operated tourist trains every summer through 2011. From 1960 to 2008 the trains were operated by the EBT under Kovalchick Salvage. From 1956 until 2020, the majority of the railroad was still owned by Kovalchick Salvage. It was overseen by Nick Kovalchick from 1956 to 1977 and by Nick's son, Joe, and his wife Judy, after 1977. That included assistance from long-time EBT employee Stanley Hall, who did almost any job, and eventually rose to General Manager before his retirement.

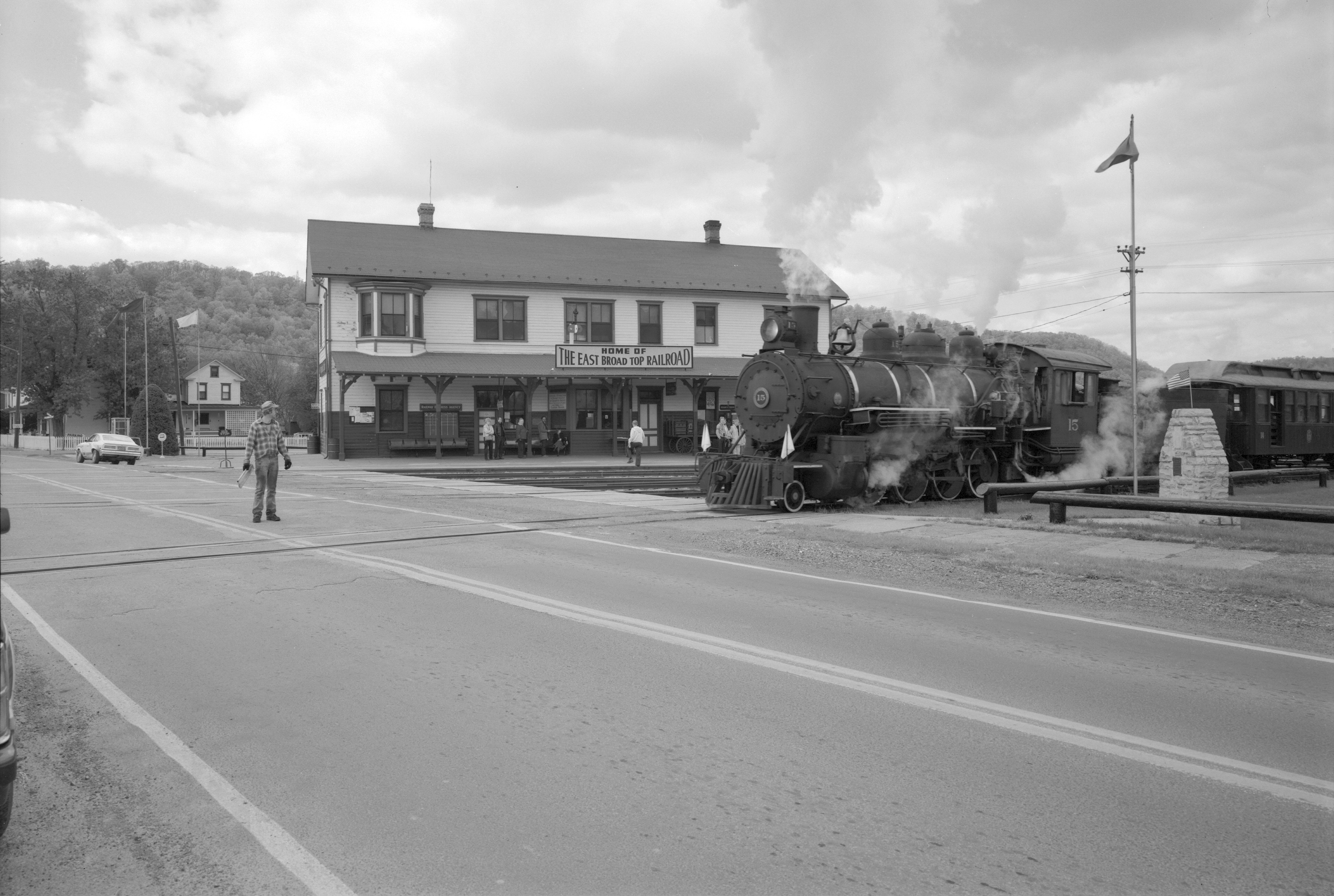
East Broad Top #15 in front of Orbisonia Station, 1986

From May 2009 until December 2011, trains were operated under a lease to the East Broad Top Railroad Preservation Association, a non-profit founded with the intention of acquiring the railroad and reactivating all 33 miles (53 km) of the railroad's original main line (only 5 miles (8 km) operated for tourist operations). The EBTPA made a number of improvements on site as well as adding numerous special events like Day Out with Thomas and Polar Express. In 2011, EBTPA extended the season and operating days of the week. The original three-year lease expired in April 2012, and Kovalchick Salvage and EBTPA were unable to reach an agreement to continue operations. As such the lease was terminated.

==== About heritage operations ====
From 1960 until 2011 the line operated as a heritage railway, with trains pulled by 3 ft narrow gauge 2-8-2 steam locomotives. Vintage diesels operated as backup power. Excursions generally ran May through October. Special events and holidays trains ran in November and December.

The rides were 10-mile (16 km) round trips and took about an hour. The EBT annual Fall Spectacular, when all operating equipment was in use, was held on the Saturday and Sunday of Columbus Day weekend in October. There were also local events such as Community Appreciation Day. The train stopped at Colgate Grove, a picnic grove at the far end of the operable excursion trackage. The train was turned on a wye for the return trip. The historic railroad maintenance shops were usually open for tours when trains were running, and for group tours by arrangement. Speeder, handcar, and M-3 rides were often available on the restored trackage just south of Rockhill Furnace.

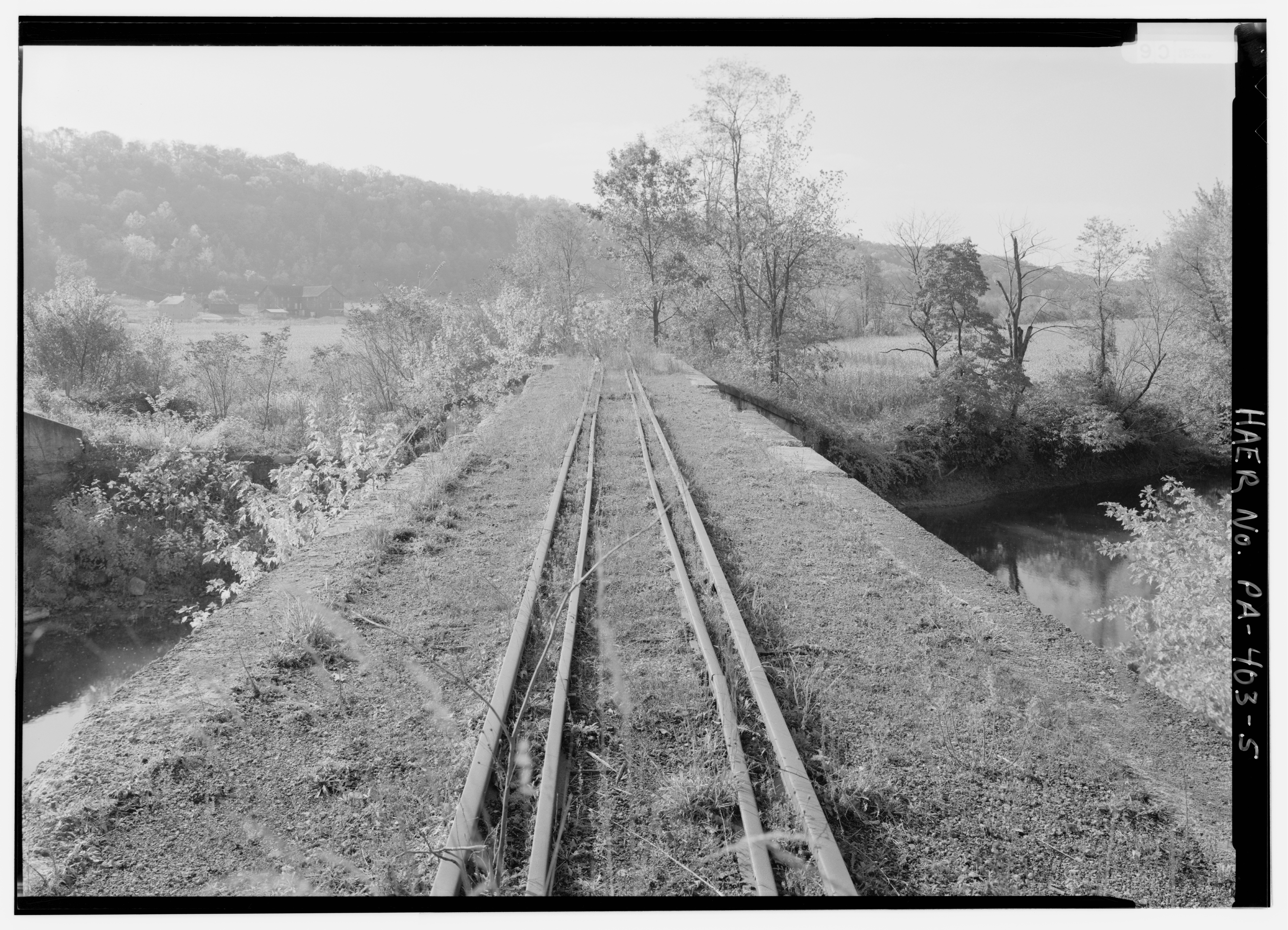
Augwick Creek/Aughwick Creek railroad bridge (1986)

During this era of operations, four of the six Mikados were in service: #12, #14, #15 and #17. The heavier locomotives #16 and #18 never operated during this era, due to finances, differing opinions, and concerns about the effect their weight would have on the track; #17, of very similar size to #16 and #18, was used sparingly, typically only running during the annual fall spectaculars.

There were plans during this era to bring other portions of the East Broad Top back to service, most notably with the 1990 National Park Service proposal, but funding and inner politics prevented this, and operational trackage was never further extended.

As the years went on, the condition of the running locomotives deteriorated, and both rising costs and stricter operational standards after the 1995 Gettysburg Railroad boiler explosion led to the eventual retirement of many of the Mikados. #12 last operated in 2000, #17 in 2001, and #14 in 2005. Engine #15 was overhauled in the early 2000s and returned to service in 2005, allowing it to remain in service until the railroad ceased operations at the end of 2011.

=== Closure - 2012 to 2020 ===
During the closure, the railroad facilities were maintained by a skeleton staff of paid employees and Friends of the East Broad Top (FEBT) volunteers. FRA inspections and paperwork were kept up on locomotive #15 in preparation for a possible reopening. Although no public excursions were held from 2012 to 2019, diesel-powered trains were operated for members of the FEBT on October 6, 2012 and October 12, 2013, as well as an M-1 excursion to McMullens Summit. Motorcar excursions were also operated for members of the FEBT attending its annual Fall Reunion on Columbus day weekends.

After the end of its operating lease, the East Broad Top Preservation Association had raised enough money to purchase some portions of the EBT. On June 3, 2013, it was announced that the East Broad Top Preservation Association had purchased the first part of the East Broad Top Railroad. In two separate transactions, the Association purchased the old PRR/Conrail spur from the Norfolk Southern mainline to the northern end of the EBT yard from Kovalchick Salvage, and the EBT Mount Union yard from the Conrail Spur tie-in to the US 522 crossing from the East Broad Top Railroad and Coal Company EBTPA subsequently purchased the line from Mount Union to Aughwick. After these initial purchases, the EBTPA was unable to fund further purchases of portions of the EBT.

The Friends of the East Broad Top continued many ongoing and new restoration projects in Rockhill Furnace throughout the closure of the railroad, with the active encouragement of owner Joe Kovalchick. FEBT also assisted with routine site maintenance and repair of the EBT Facilities.

Tours of the Historic Shops complex were initially offered only for groups of 20 or more by prior arrangement with the railroad. Public tours were increasingly offered on selected summer days as the closure continued.

The neighboring Rockhill Trolley Museum continued to operate its regular summer schedule and special events, as well as their portion of the Fall Spectaculars during Columbus Day weekend in October.

=== Sale and reopening - 2020 to Present ===
On Valentine's Day, 2020, a press conference was held in Rockhill announcing that a new non-profit, the EBT Foundation, had purchased the railroad, and planned to restart excursions in 2021. The sale included approximately 27 miles of line, the yard complex in Rockhill Furnace, and all associated rolling stock and equipment. Financial details of the sale have not been disclosed. The EBTF board includes notable rail preservationists Bennett Levin and Henry Posner III, former CEO of both Norfolk Southern Railway and Amtrak, Charles "Wick" Moorman and longtime EBT activists Lawrence Biemiller, Brad Esposito and David Brightbill.

The sale of the railroad to the EBTF did not include portions of the railroad previously purchased by the East Broad Top Preservation Association. The two non-profits are separate and unaffiliated. It did not include EBT standard gauge steam locomotive #3 then stored at the Mount Union yard.

Immediately after the announcement, the EBTF began several parallel projects at the railroad to prepare for resumption of operations. All six narrow-gauge steam locomotives were thoroughly evaluated to determine their condition and which were the best candidates for return to operation. Nos. 14 and 16 were selected to be the first to be restored and were abated of asbestos and restoration work begun. Stall #8 of the Rockhill Roundhouse was rehabilitated and converted into a restoration facility for the steam locomotives. Woodford Brothers (who performed structural repairs of the Blacksmith Shop during the closure) were contracted to perform a complete structural repair on the Rockhill Shops. The FEBT Restoration crew will perform the balance of the needed work of this project. A contractor has been secured to install a fire suppression system throughout the Shops Complex and Roundhouse. Several large scale track rebuilding projects were executed around the Rockhill yard. Thousands of ties were delivered to Rockhill to rehabilitate the tourist portion of the line. In May and June 2020 the restoration efforts encountered setbacks from an act of arson and a bridge was damaged by an over-height vehicle.

The East Broad Top reopened for limited operations in May 2021, and officially reopened for its first full season in May 2022. EBT No. 16 returned to steam in early February, 2023.

In the spring of 2026, legal discussion and debate began over the 4.7 miles of trackage into Mount Union owned by the EBTPA. Both the EBT Foundation and a new shortline railroad, the Juniata & Aughwick Railroad, sought to acquire the track. In the fall of 2026, a judge ruled that the EBT Foundation could purchase the trackage owned by the EBTPA. The ruling now awaits approval by the Pennsylvania Attorney General. On October 13, 2026, the judge turned down a motion by the Juniata & Aughwick to reconsider his ruling.

== Restoration efforts ==
In the years following the EBT's opening as a tourist hauler, many of the structures along the disused portion of the railroad fell into disrepair and were lost to neglect or arson. Maintenance on the original railroad maintenance shops and other buildings at Rockhill Furnace and on unused equipment was neglected as employees focused the limited manpower on operating the train and maintaining core facilities. As a result, historic fabric outside the core tourist operations was severely threatened.

In 1983, the non-profit Friends of the East Broad Top (FEBT) was organized to preserve and restore the East Broad Top. While initially there was a good working relationship between the EBT and the FEBT, including two and a half years of restoration work at Rockhill Furnace, a series of events in 1985 led to friction and distrust between the two entities. At that time, FEBT re-focused on restoration at Robertsdale where it purchased or leased two historic EBT/RI&C Structures, and on former EBT combine #16 it had leased. In the late 1990s the relationship was on the mend with cooperative projects and starting in 2002 FEBT volunteers again began restoration work in Rockhill Furnace. This work continues today and has grown immensely in scope and depth during that time.

As of late 2022 the Foundation has three full-time paid track crew members. On weekends the volunteer FEBT Rockhill Restoration Crew performs restoration work on the historic railroad, except October and December, as well as a special work week per year. FEBT volunteers restore buildings, machinery, repair track and rolling stock, provide tours, and help maintain the premises. Since 2002 substantial restoration has occurred on more than half the core maintenance shop complex. Several other buildings have received moderate to extensive restoration. Five pieces of rolling stock have been returned to operation with three more in progress. Six pieces of machinery in the maintenance shops have been restored to operation and some are being used to make parts for other restoration projects. Seven pieces of track have received work. The crew also works on restoration projects on parts of the railroad outside Rockhill Furnace.

With the purchase of the railroad by the EBT Foundation, which has an excellent working relationship with FEBT, restoration work is being greatly accelerated. EBTF is providing funding and contractors for major work, and the FEBT continues to cover moderate and smaller portions of projects, as well as larger, non-pending projects. As of October 2020 yard trackage at Robertsdale, which is approximately 19 miles from the heritage Rockhill Furnace station, was cleared of brush, and the scale track in front of the depot was restored. Three coal hopper cars were transported by flatbed truck for display and marked the first time since 1956 that EBT rolling stock returned to the site of its headquarters during its days as a coal carrier.

In October 2021 the Friends group announced plans to rebuild the Saltillo station and water tank. The tank was burned by local vandals in 1986 and the severely deteriorated station building was demolished in 2004. In November 2025 the exterior construction of a new station building was complete and utility systems were being installed. While it outwardly resembles the original Saltillo station it is in compliance with modern building codes and the Americans with Disabilities Act. In July 2025 one of the railroad's water columns was rebuilt and reactivated in the Rockhill yard.

=== Track rehabilitation ===
In December 2021 the railroad received a state Redevelopment Assistance Capital Program grant for $1.1M USD. The funds will be used to restore and reopen the main line to Saltillo and other capital improvements. In May 2022 the railroad took the first steps toward reopening the line from Rockhill Furnace south to Saltillo by cutting down growth and repairing drainage along the right-of-way.

Deteriorated structures at the Colgate picnic grove, at the railroad's wye track on the old Clay spur, were demolished. New pavilions, restrooms, and a boarding platform were opened for the 2023 season.

During 2023-2024 the right of way was rebuilt and opened up to Pennsylvania Route 475. Heritage service opened on the restored 1.3-mile section in October 2024. As of August 2025 track restoration had reached the Huntingdon County High School just below the reactivated Pogue Road crossing at Pennsylvania Route 994. In March 2026 track installation began at the reconstructed Saltillo station. Work will proceed railroad north and will eventually connect with the previously reactivated section. As of October 2026 crews were clearing and grading the right of way railroad north from Saltillo to Three Springs.

The line south of Saltillo is blocked by two 1874-built tunnels that require significant repair work. In 2022 a LIDAR equipped drone was used to survey their condition for rehabilitation planning. This work would be very costly as no volunteer labor would be allowed in the tunnels for safety and liability concerns.

At Robertsdale, which is blocked from the operating portion of the railroad by the two tunnels, the first section of a hard-paved walking path to the former coal mine sites once served by the EBT opened in October 2024. The path will eventually extend about one mile and include interpretive signage. Rail bikes and speeders now operate over two miles of EBT track to the town of Woodvale. In August the Friends group began preparing the foundation of the long-demolished engine house for the construction of a replica building.

== Rockhill Trolley Museum ==
The Rockhill Trolley Museum, operated by Railways to Yesterday, adjoins the railroad and offers 3-mile (4.8 km) round-trip trolley rides during the tourist season on the former Shade Gap Branch of the EBT (now re-laid with 4 ft 8 1/2 in or 1,435 mm standard gauge), which follows Blacklog Creek. While the trolley museum is an entirely separate entity, it coordinates its schedules with the EBT.

As of July 1, 2026, the EBT is limiting use of Rockhill's trolley tracks to afternoons only, Friday through Sunday. This is so that the EBT can operate rail bikes on the Rockhill Right-of-Way (RoW). The foundation behind the EBT has longer term goals for the Rockhill property and RoW. While the Rockhill Trolley Museum is not expected to close, its future is now in doubt.

== Friends of the East Broad Top Museum ==
FEBT operates a museum complex in the community of Robertsdale in Wood Township, Pennsylvania known as the Friends of the East Broad Top Museum. The museum is located in the East Broad Top Robertsdale Station, about 40 minutes from the operating portion of the railroad, and contains historic artifacts and documents. Robertsdale was hub of the coal mining operations of the Rockhill Iron and Coal Company which hauled the coal on the EBT. The goal of the FEBT Museum is to present the history and culture of the East Broad Top Railroad and Coal Company and the industries it served in the surrounding area. FEBT is also nearing completion on the restoration of the RI&C Co. owned Robertsdale Post Office building, which will eventually house the museum's exhibits, while the station will be fully restored to its period appearance.

The Robertsdale Historic District and Woodvale Historic District were listed on the National Register of Historic Places in 1992.

== Locomotives ==
Steam locomotive No. 16, which had been out of service since 1956, was fired up in July 2022 in preparation for its entry into excursion service. It was operated during the 2023 season but the following April was withdrawn from service when a crack was found in the center of one of its drive wheels. Following 8 months of repair work and successful test runs, No. 16 returned to service on August 30, 2024. No. 15 was undergoing operational restoration in late 2025 although there is no timetable for its return to service. No. 14 would follow after that.

To meet EBT's expanding operations, in February 2025 it acquired a 1946 Porter diesel locomotive from the Durango and Silverton. The unit was assigned No. 19.

=== Motive power ===
Lovomotive details
| Engine No. (Name) | Image | Built | Builder | Type | Model | Status |
|---|---|---|---|---|---|---|
| 12 (Millie) | | 1911 | Baldwin Locomotive Works | Mikado | 2-8-2 | Out of service |
| 14 | | 1912 | Baldwin Locomotive Works | Mikado | 2-8-2 | Out of service |
| 15 | | 1914 | Baldwin Locomotive Works | Mikado | 2-8-2 | Under restoration |
| 16 (Nick) | | 1916 | Baldwin Locomotive Works | Mikado | 2-8-2 | Operational |
| 17 | | 1918 | Baldwin Locomotive Works | Mikado | 2-8-2 | Out of service |
| 18 | | 1920 | Baldwin Locomotive Works | Mikado | 2-8-2 | Out of service |
| M-1 | | 1927 | Brill/EBT | Doodlebug | 250 | Operational |
| M-3 | | 1928 | EBT | Inspection car | Unknown | Operational |
| M-4 | | 1947 | Plymouth Locomotive Works | Switcher | JCD | Operational |
| M-6 | | 1969 | Plymouth Locomotive Works | Switcher | JDT | Operational |
| M-7 | | 1964 | General Electric | Switcher | 45-ton switcher | Operational |
| 19 | | 1946 | H.K. Porter, Inc. | Switcher | DE75CT | Operational, awaiting repaint |

In July 2022, the railroad took delivery of the first of four newly constructed passenger cars built in Bellingham, Washington. Outwardly they resemble 1890s-era passenger cars but include amenities such as electric lighting, baseboard heating, and modern lavatories. One car is a baggage/combine with wheelchair lifts.

=== Standard Gauge Switchers ===
Locomotive details
| Engine No. (Name) | Image | Built | Builder | Type | Date Left EBT | Status |
|---|---|---|---|---|---|---|
| 2 (2) (R D Wood) | | 1883 | Baldwin | 0-6-0 | 1914 | Scrapped 1914 |
| 6 (2) | | 1902 | PRR | 0-6-0T | 1906 | |
| 6 (3) | | 1907 | Baldwin | 0-6-0 | 1975 | Out of service since 1980, Whitewater Valley Railroad |
| 3 (2) | | 1911 | Pittsburgh and Lake Erie | 0-6-0 | 1922 | |
| 3 (3) | | 1923 | Baldwin | 0-6-0 | 2024 | On Display Red Bay, Alabama |

The EBT owned a total of 5 standard gauge 0-6-0 switching locomotives at the dual-gauge Mount Union yard over the railroads existence, with the last two of these units surviving into the preservation era. Owned by the East Broad Top Preservation Association, Switcher #3(3) was sold to the Red Bay Museum in Red Bay, Alabama where it has been on public display ever since.

== See also ==
- Kinzua Viaduct, the remaining structure sold was scrap to Kovalchik Corporation and is now a Pennsylvania State Park.
- List of heritage railroads in the United States
- List of National Historic Landmarks in Pennsylvania

== Additional reading ==
- Rainey, Lee; Kyper, Frank (1982). East Broad Top. San Marino, CA: Golden West Books. ISBN 0-87095-078-9.
- Joseph A Mannix (1960): A quick review of the East Broad Top, the narrow gauge of the East. Rockhill Furnace, Pa., East Broad Railroad and Coal Co.
- Cupper, Dan (January 2021). "East Broad Top looks south". Trains. Kalmbach Media. pp. 44–45.
