= Rockhill Trolley Museum =

Transport museum in Pennsylvania, United States

Coordinates: 40°14′27″N 77°53′54.5″W

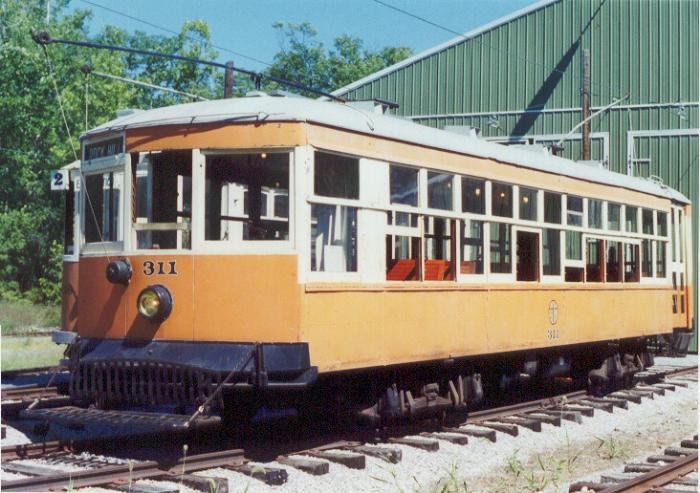
Johnstown Traction 311, the Rockhill Trolley Museum's first acquisition in its collection.

The Rockhill Trolley Museum is a museum and heritage railway in Rockhill Furnace, Pennsylvania that collects and restores trolley, interurban, and transit cars. Founded in 1960, the museum operates what has been historically referred to as the Shade Gap Electric Railway to demonstrate the operable pieces in its collection. "Shade Gap" refers to the name of a branch of the East Broad Top Railroad, from whom the museum leases its property.

The first car acquired by the museum in 1960 is Johnstown Traction #311. Recent acquisitions include Public Service Coordinated Transport (later New Jersey Transit), Newark, NJ Presidents' Conference Committee (PCC) Car #6 and Iowa Terminal Railroad Snow Sweeper #3.

The museum formerly operated under its corporate name, Railways to Yesterday. It changed to its current name to acknowledge and enhance its relationship with, and provide mutual promotional support to, its hometown.

The museum is open from May through October and for special holiday events. For the latter—including Easter, Pumpkin Festival in October, and Christmas in Coal Country—the museum partners with the East Broad Top Railroad and Coal Company, which is across the street. While the two organizations are not formally affiliated and do not cross-honor tickets, the railroad sells tickets for the combined events with the trolley museum, and the two organizations share volunteers and labor expertise.

== Roster ==
Number	Type	Heritage	Builder	Date	Condition	Notes
3	Snow sweeper	Emery, Iowa	McGuire-Cummings Manufacturing Company	1911	Operating	Acquired in a trade wherein the National Capital Trolley Museum received Snow Sweeper #09 from the museum
6	PCC streetcar	Public Service Coordinated Transport, later New Jersey Transit	St. Louis Car Company	1949	Operating	Originally Twin City Rapid Transit car #325
10	Snowplow	Philadelphia and Western Railroad	Wason Manufacturing Company	1915	Operating	Retired 1988, last operating trolley snowplow in the United States outside of a museum.
12	Streetcar	Valley Railways, west of Harrisburg, Pennsylvania	Jackson and Sharp Company	1895	Inoperable	
61	Streetcar	Philadelphia Suburban	Brill	1925	Inoperable	Center door
107	Snow sweeper	Scranton Transit	Chicago and Joliet Electric Railway	1910	Operating	Steeplecab
162	Streetcar	Philadelphia and Western	Brill	1927	Inoperable	High-speed interurban car
163	Streetcar	York Railways	Brill	1924	Operating	Rare curved-sides car
172	Tram	CCFP/STCP (Porto, Portugal)	CCFP	1929	Operating	Semi-convertible (open/closed) car.
205	Tram/Interurban EMU	Philadelphia and Western	Brill	1931	Operating	Only operating Brill bullet, originally 3rd rail powered
249	Tram	CCFP/STCP	Brill	1904	Operating	Semi-convertible.
311	Streetcar	Johnstown Traction Company	Wason Manufacturing Company	1922	Operating	First car of the museum.
315	Streetcar	Chicago Aurora and Elgin Railroad	G. C. Kuhlman Car Company	1909	Operating	Wooden interurban car
355	Streetcar	Johnstown Traction Company	St. Louis Car Company	1926	Operating	
402	Box motor	Philadelphia and Western	Detroit United Railway	1920	Operating	Double-ended
710	Tram	Harrisburg Railways	Brill	1913	Inoperable	Semi-convertible.
1009	Rapid transit car	Delaware River Port Authority Bridge-line car	Brill	1936	Inoperable	Sold to Philadelphia Broad Street Subway for $10,000 following the formation of the PATCO Speedline in 1968.
1019	Siemens–Duewag U2	San Diego Trolley	Duewag	1982	Operating	Only operating articulated car from San Diego, California on the East Coast. Most modern vehicle in collection.
1875	Tram	Rio de Janeiro Tramways	Brill	1912	Operating	
2743	PCC streetcar	Philadelphia Transportation Company, later SEPTA	St. Louis Car Company	1947	Operating	Originally Pennsylvania trolley gauge
19137	Caboose	Pennsylvania Railroad		1900s	Not used	N-5 steel
C-64	Freight flat	CCFP/STCP	CCFP	1933	Operating	Now used as a track maintenance. car
D-39	Tower car	SEPTA	Philadelphia Rapid Transit	1908	not Operating	Overhead wire maintenance car.
M-25	GE 25-ton switcher	Adtranz	GE Transportation	1942	Operating	Originally owned by United States Navy
M-100	Railroad speeder	United States Navy	Kalamazoo Manufacturing Company	1945	Operating	Petrol engine
X-4	Cherry picker car		Rockhill Trolley Museum	1998	Operating	
X-39	Caboose	Central of Georgia Railway			Not used	Wooden
BT-1	Boom truck	Curry Supply Company	GMC	1981	Operating	
Liberty Liner Independence Hall	Electroliner	Philadelphia Suburban	St. Louis Car Company	1941	Operating	Originally Chicago North Shore and Milwaukee Railroad No. 803-804
	Ballast car		Rockhill Trolley Museum	1999	In use	
	Railroad tie nipper		Rockhill Trolley Museum	2000	In use	
