= Orbisonia, Pennsylvania =

Borough in Pennsylvania, US

- Borough
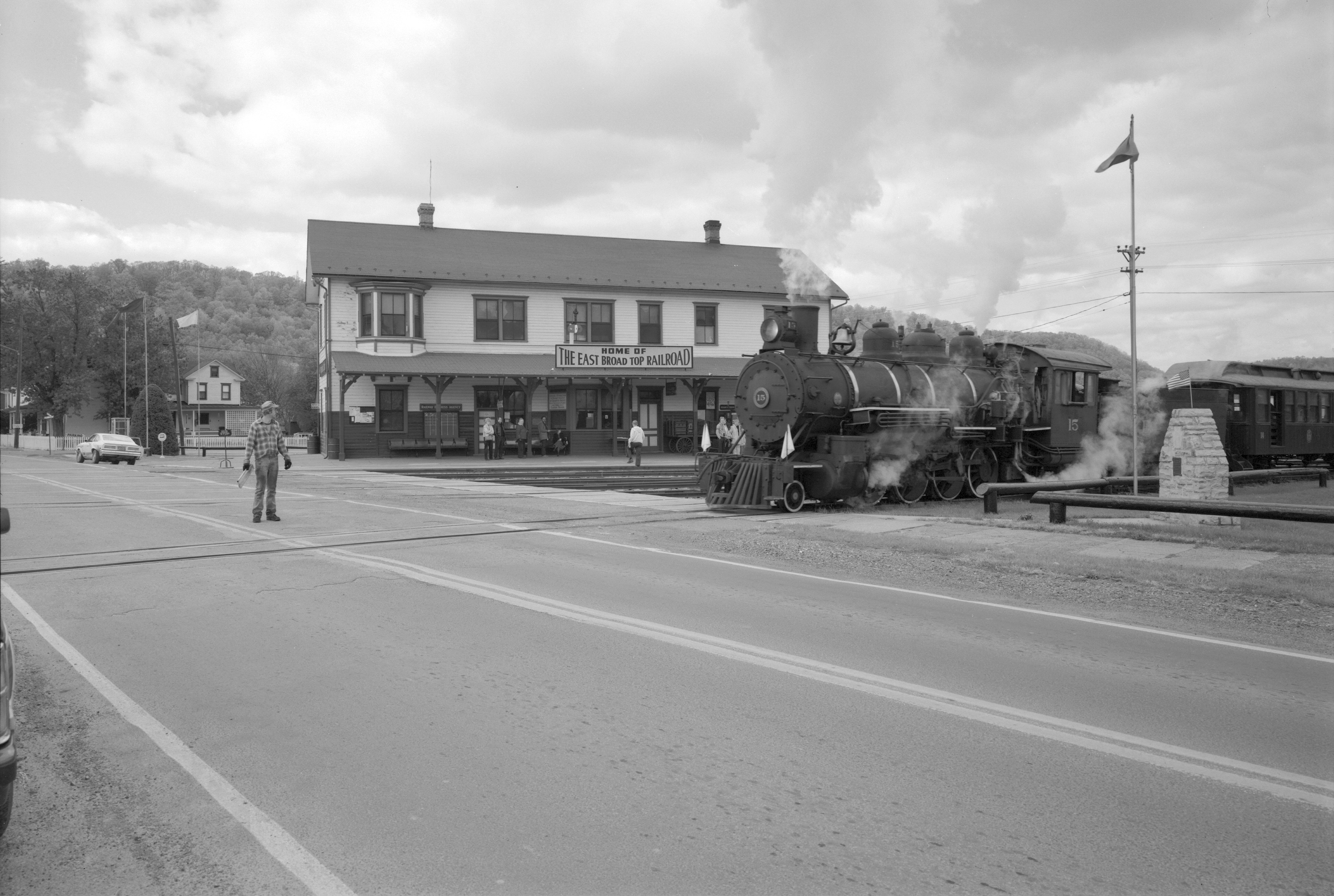
- The East Broad Top Railroad ran through Orbisonia, 1986

- Location of Orbisonia in Huntingdon County, Pennsylvania.

- Location within Pennsylvania Location within the United States
- Coordinates: 40°14′35″N 77°53′35″W
- Country: United States
- State: Pennsylvania
- County: Huntingdon

Government
  - Type: Borough Council
  - Mayor: Linda Clark
  - Borough President: Stephen E Scott

Area
  - Total: 0.097 sq mi (0.25 km^{2})
  - Land: 0.097 sq mi (0.25 km^{2})
  - Water: 0 sq mi (0.00 km^{2})
- Elevation: 643 ft (196 m)

Population (2020)
  - Total: 449
  - Density: 4,600.3/sq mi (1,776.17/km^{2})
- Time zone: UTC-5 (Eastern (EST))
  - Summer (DST): UTC-4 (EDT)
- ZIP code: 17243
- Area code: 814
- FIPS code: 42-56928
- GNIS feature ID: 1215275
- Local phone exchanges: 447, 448

Orbisonia is a borough in Huntingdon County, Pennsylvania, United States. As of the 2020 census, Orbisonia had a population of 449.

== Geography ==
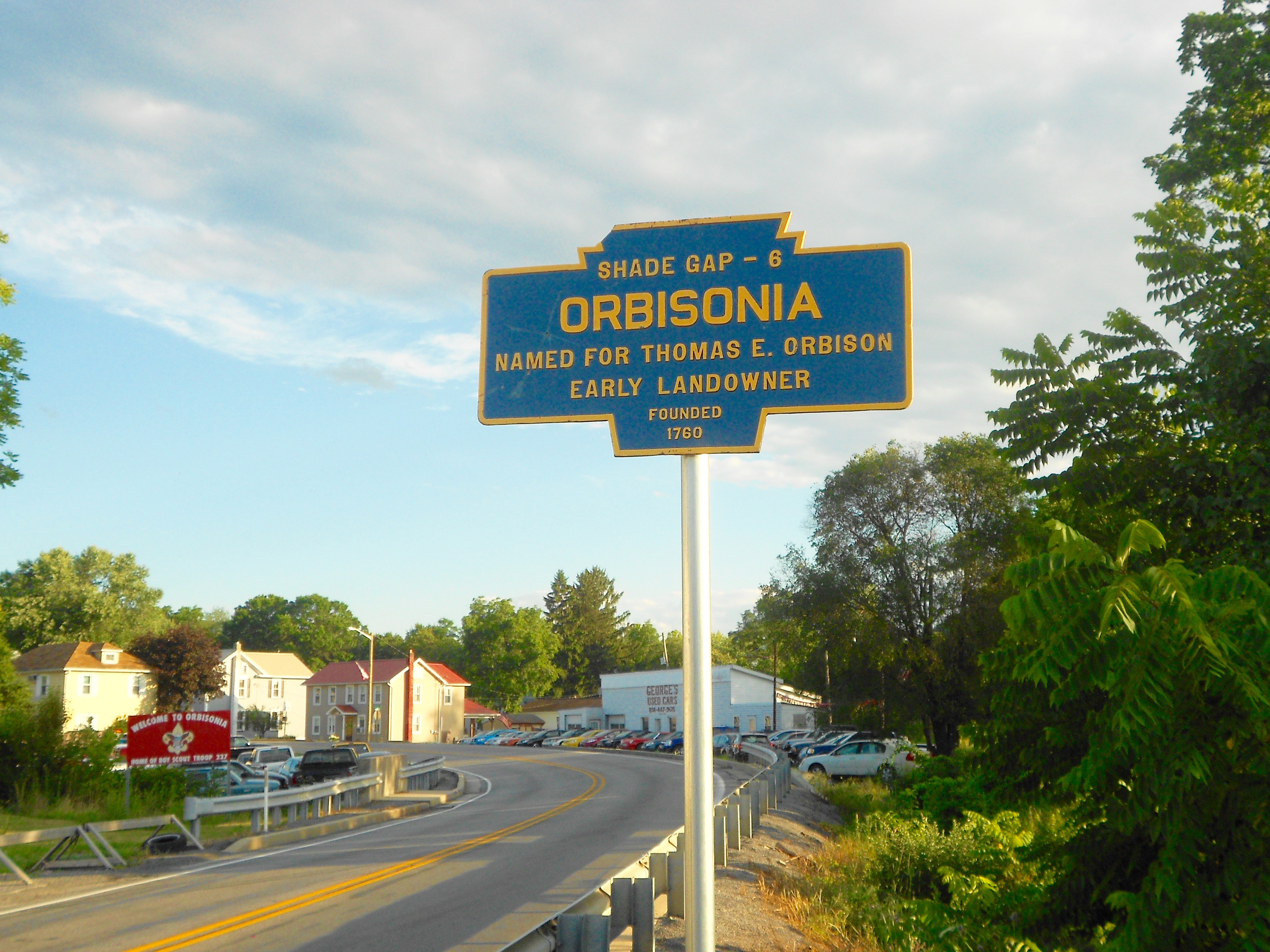
Keystone marker on Croghan Pike (US 522) in Orbisonia, July 2016

Orbisonia is located in southeastern Huntingdon County on the northeastern side of Blacklog Creek, a tributary of Aughwick Creek and part of the Juniata River watershed. Orbisonia is bordered to the southwest by Rockhill, across Blacklog Creek. Blacklog Mountain overlooks the borough to the east.

U.S. Route 522 passes through Orbisonia, leading north 10 miles (16 km) to Mount Union and south 5 miles (8 km) to Shade Gap.

According to the United States Census Bureau, Orbisonia has a total area of 0.097 square miles (0.25 km^{2}), all land.

== Demographics ==
Historical population
Census	Pop.	Note	%±
1860	188		—
1870	177		−5.9%
1880	766		332.8%
1890	963		25.7%
1900	653		−32.2%
1910	618		−5.4%
1920	682		10.4%
1930	741		8.7%
1940	729		−1.6%
1950	648		−11.1%
1960	643		−0.8%
1970	554		−13.8%
1980	506		−8.7%
1990	447		−11.7%
2000	425		−4.9%
2010	428		0.7%
2020	449		4.9%

At the 2000 census there were 425 people, 198 households, and 109 families residing in the borough. The population density was 4,790.2 inhabitants per square mile (1,849.5/km^{2}). There were 217 housing units at an average density of 2,445.8 per square mile (944.3/km^{2}). The racial makeup of the borough was 99.06% White, 0.24% African American, 0.24% Native American, and 0.47% from two or more races. Hispanic or Latino of any race were 0.47%.

There were 198 households, 24.2% had children under the age of 18 living with them, 42.4% were married couples living together, 8.6% had a female householder with no husband present, and 44.9% were non-families. 44.4% of households were made up of individuals, and 29.8% were one person aged 65 or older. The average household size was 2.15 and the average family size was 3.00.

In the borough, the population was spread out, with 22.8% under the age of 18, 4.7% from 18 to 24, 24.0% from 25 to 44, 21.4% from 45 to 64, and 27.1% 65 or older. The median age was 44 years. For every 100 females, there were 90.6 males. For every 100 females age 18 and over, there were 82.2 males.

The median household income was $25,000 and the median family income was $38,333. Males had a median income of $31,250 versus $20,625 for females. The per capita income for the borough was $16,911. About 5.8% of families and 11.0% of the population were below the poverty line, including 7.4% of those under age 18 and 19.8% of those age 65 or over.

== Public services ==
=== Emergency services ===
- Orbisonia and Rockhill Volunteer Fire Company

=== Health care ===
- Southern Huntingdon County Medical Center

=== Postal services ===
- Orbisonia Post Office

== Non-profit organizations ==
- Orbisonia Lions Club
- Orbisonia Food Pantry

== See also ==
- List of boroughs in Pennsylvania
