= Rockhill, Pennsylvania =

Borough in Pennsylvania, US

- Borough
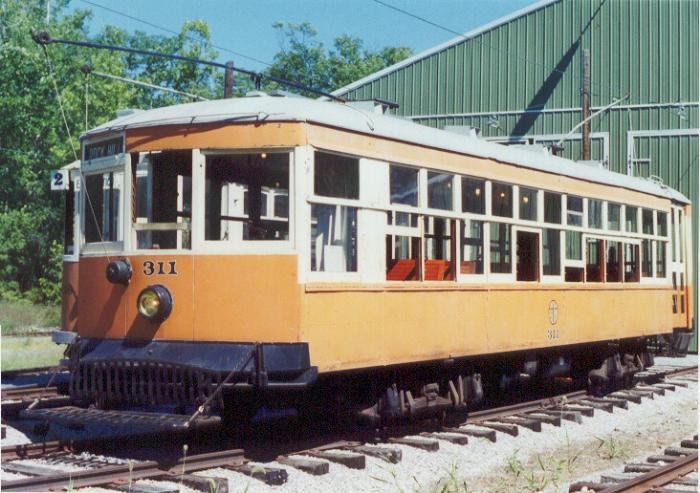
- The Rockhill Trolley Museum

- Location of Rockhill in Huntingdon County, Pennsylvania.

- Location within Pennsylvania Location within the United States
- Coordinates: 40°14′28″N 77°53′58″W
- Country: United States
- State: Pennsylvania
- County: Huntingdon

Government
  - Type: Borough Council
  - Mayor: Karl Barry (R)

Area
  - Total: 0.29 sq mi (0.75 km^{2})
  - Land: 0.29 sq mi (0.75 km^{2})
  - Water: 0 sq mi (0.00 km^{2})
- Elevation: 627 ft (191 m)

Population (2020)
  - Total: 379
  - Density: 1,302.5/sq mi (502.91/km^{2})
- Time zone: UTC-5 (Eastern (EST))
  - Summer (DST): UTC-4 (EDT)
- ZIP code: 17249
- Area code: 814
- FIPS code: 42-65496
- GNIS feature ID: 1215277
- Local phone exchanges: 447, 448

Rockhill or Rockhill Furnace is a borough in Huntingdon County, Pennsylvania, United States. As of the 2020 census, Rockhill had a population of 379. It is the site of the East Broad Top Railroad and the Rockhill Trolley Museum.

Although the community was long known as "Rockhill Furnace", its name has always officially been "Rockhill".

== Geography ==
Rockhill is located in southern Huntingdon County on the southwestern side of Blacklog Creek, across from its neighbor, the borough of Orbisonia. It is bordered to the west by 920-foot-high (280 m) Saddle Back Ridge. Pennsylvania Route 994 passes through Rockhill, ending to the north in Orbisonia at U.S. Route 522 and leading southwest 6 miles (10 km) to Three Springs.

According to the United States Census Bureau, Rockhill borough has a total area of 0.29 square miles (0.75 km^{2}), all land.

== Demographics ==
Historical population
Census	Pop.	Note	%±
1890	657		—
1900	495		−24.7%
1910	504		1.8%
1920	500		−0.8%
1930	502		0.4%
1940	548		9.2%
1950	567		3.5%
1960	566		−0.2%
1970	480		−15.2%
1980	472		−1.7%
1990	421		−10.8%
2000	414		−1.7%
2010	371		−10.4%
2020	379		2.2%
U.S. Decennial Census

As of the census of 2000, there were 414 people, 173 households, and 119 families residing in the borough. The population density was 1,323.8 inhabitants per square mile (511.1/km^{2}). There were 186 housing units at an average density of 594.7 per square mile (229.6/km^{2}). The racial makeup of the borough was 99.28% White, 0.72% from other races. Hispanic or Latino of any race were 2.42% of the population.

There were 173 households, out of which 27.7% had children under the age of 18 living with them, 55.5% were married couples living together, 10.4% had a female householder with no husband present, and 31.2% were non-families. 27.2% of all households were made up of individuals, and 13.3% had someone living alone who was 65 years of age or older. The average household size was 2.39 and the average family size was 2.90.

In the borough the population was spread out, with 23.7% under the age of 18, 6.0% from 18 to 24, 28.7% from 25 to 44, 23.7% from 45 to 64, and 17.9% who were 65 years of age or older. The median age was 41 years. For every 100 females there were 84.8 males. For every 100 females age 18 and over, there were 82.7 males.

The median income for a household in the borough was $27,639, and the median income for a family was $36,250. Males had a median income of $31,125 versus $20,375 for females. The per capita income for the borough was $15,376. About 9.4% of families and 13.8% of the population were below the poverty line, including 14.0% of those under age 18 and 21.3% of those age 65 or over.

== History ==
The narrow-gauge East Broad Top Railroad was constructed through the community in 1873. Rockhill was selected as the location of the railroad's maintenance facility. The parent company Rockhill Iron and Coal located their dual-stack coke-fired iron furnace here. Rockhill as it exists today was created by the coal company and the railroad as a support community for their infrastructure.

The iron furnace shut down for the last time in 1907, and the railroad became the primary employer. The EBT shut down in 1956, but a portion from Rockhill north to Shirleysburg was reactivated in 1960 as a tourist operation. In the late 2000s the track to the south was rehabilitated to PA 475 sufficiently for speeders to operate and give rides to the public. In 2022, trackage was restored to the wye at Colgate Grove, with reproduction passenger cars powered by a small diesel locomotive. On February 18, 2023, their steam locomotive, #16, rode the rails again for the first time since 1956, carrying passengers to Colgate Grove.

Friends of the East Broad Top, Inc. have been working to provide rehabilitation to the facilities in Rockhill. Tours inside the East Broad Top shop complex are offered during the summer months.

== Points of interest ==
- Rockhill Trolley Museum
- East Broad Top Railroad
