= Wood Township, Pennsylvania =

Township in Pennsylvania, US

Coordinates: 40°10′30″N 78°07′44″W

- Township
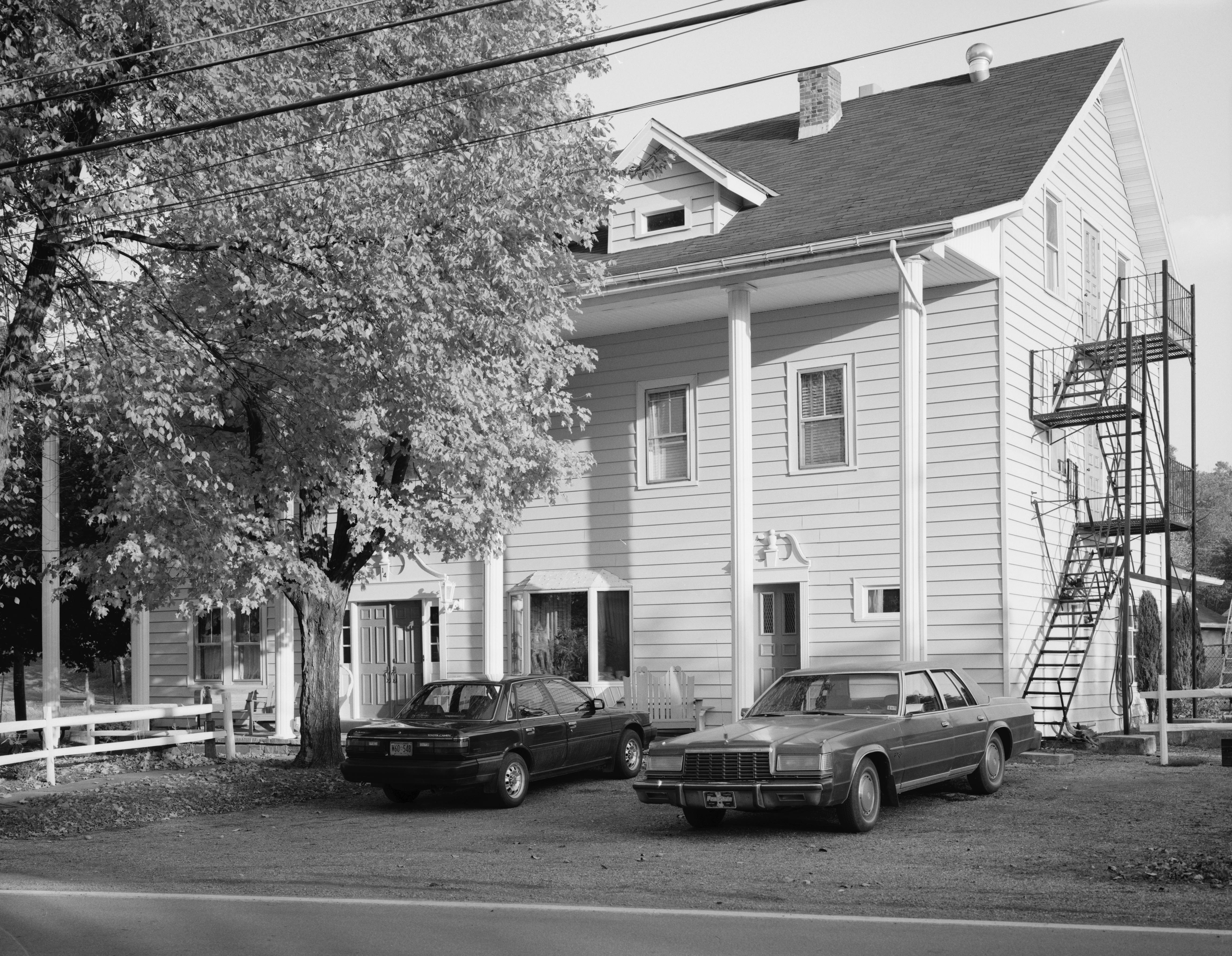
- The former Robertsdale Hotel

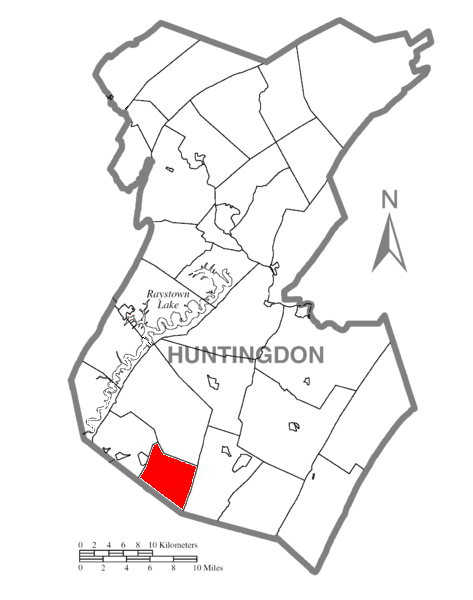
- Map of Huntingdon County, Pennsylvania Highlighting Wood Township

- Map of Huntingdon County, Pennsylvania
- Country: United States
- State: Pennsylvania
- County: Huntingdon

Area
  - Total: 16.45 sq mi (42.61 km^{2})
  - Land: 16.45 sq mi (42.61 km^{2})
  - Water: 0 sq mi (0.00 km^{2})

Population (2020)
  - Total: 606 ▼
  - Estimate (2022): 600
  - Density: 43.2/sq mi (16.69/km^{2})
- Time zone: UTC-5 (Eastern (EST))
  - Summer (DST): UTC-4 (EDT)
- FIPS code: 42-061-86080

Wood Township is a township that is located in Huntingdon County, Pennsylvania, United States. The population was 606 at the time of the 2020 census.

== History ==
The Robertsdale Historic District was listed on the National Register of Historic Places in 1992.

== Geography ==
According to the United States Census Bureau, the township has a total area of 16.4 square miles (42.6 km^{2}), all land.

== Demographics ==
Historical population
| Census | Pop. | Note | %± |
|---|---|---|---|
| 2000 | 713 | | — |
| 2010 | 708 | | −0.7% |
| 2020 | 606 | | −14.4% |
| 2022 (est.) | 600 | | −1.0% |
U.S. Decennial Census

As of the census of 2000, there were 713 people, 277 households, and 206 families residing in the township.

The population density was 43.4 inhabitants per square mile (16.8/km^{2}). There were 383 housing units at an average density of 23.3/sq mi (9.0/km^{2}).

The racial makeup of the township was 99.30% White, 0.14% Native American, 0.28% from other races, and 0.28% from two or more races. Hispanic or Latino of any race were 0.70% of the population.

There were 277 households, out of which 34.3% had children under the age of eighteen living with them; 61.0% were married couples living together, 7.6% had a female householder with no husband present, and 25.3% were non-families. 23.1% of all households were made up of individuals, and 10.1% had someone living alone who was sixty-five years of age or older.

The average household size was 2.57 and the average family size was 2.99.

Within the township, the population was spread out, with 25.2% of residents who were under the age of eighteen, 10.1% who were aged eighteen to twenty-four, 24.7% who were aged twenty-five to forty-four, 24.7% who were aged forty-five to sixty-four, and 15.3% who were sixty-five years of age or older. The median age was thirty-eight years.

For every one hundred females, there were 100.8 males. For every one hundred females who were aged eighteen or older, there were 98.1 males.

The median income for a household in the township was $29,167, and the median income for a family was $38,438. Males had a median income of $28,654 versus $20,375 for females.

The per capita income for the township was $13,512.

Approximately 9.2% of families and 14.6% of the population were living below the poverty line, including 16.3% of those who were under the age of eighteen and 16.0% of those who were aged sixty-five or older.
