= Lafayette station (Indiana) =

Railway station in Lafayette, Indiana, US

Lafayette, IN
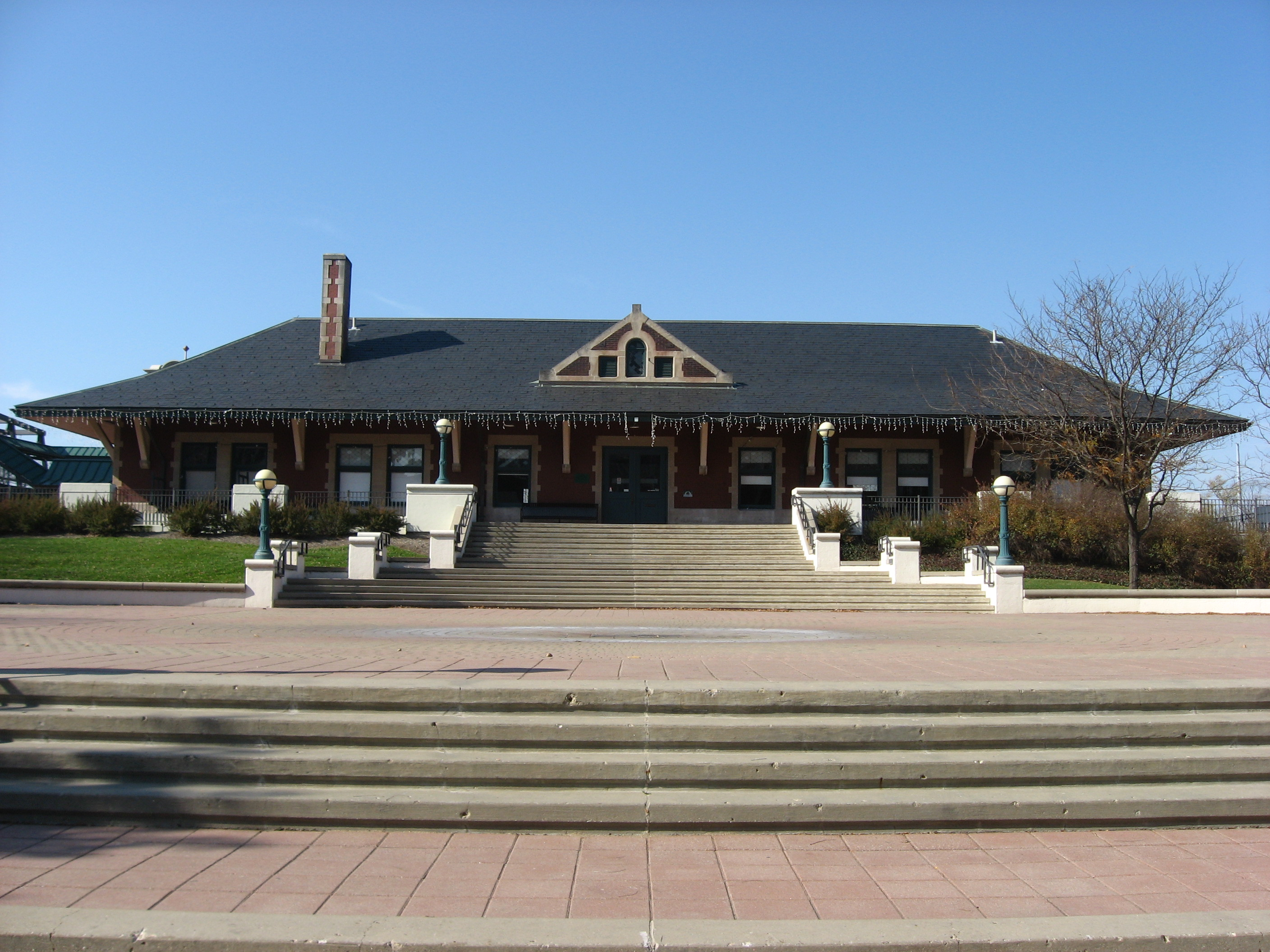
- Lafayette's historic Amtrak station in 2009; it was originally a "Big Four" Depot.

General information
- Location: 200 North 2nd Street; Lafayette, Indiana; United States
- Owner: City of Lafayette
- Line: CSX Lafayette Subdivision
- Platforms: 1 side platform
- Tracks: 3
- Connections: CityBus

Construction
- Parking: Yes
- Cycle facilities: Yes
- Accessible: Yes

Other information
- Station code: Amtrak: LAF

History
- Opened: 1902
- Rebuilt: 1994

Passengers
- FY 2025: 4,842 (Amtrak)

Services
Preceding station	Amtrak	Following station
Rensselaer toward Chicago	Cardinal	Crawfordsville toward New York
Former services
Preceding station	Amtrak	Following station
Rensselaer toward Chicago	Hoosier State 1994–2019	Crawfordsville toward Indianapolis
Rensselaer toward Chicago	Kentucky Cardinal	Crawfordsville toward Louisville
Former services at original location of Big Four Depot
Preceding station	Amtrak	Following station
Kankakee (Penn Central) toward Chicago	James Whitcomb Riley and George Washington 1971–1974	Indianapolis toward Washington, D.C. or Newport News
Kankakee (Penn Central) toward Chicago–Central	Floridian 1971–1972	Indianapolis toward St. Petersburg or Miami
Preceding station	New York Central Railroad	Following station
Templeton toward Chicago	Chicago – Cincinnati	Crane toward Cincinnati
Former services at Lahr Hotel
Preceding station	Amtrak	Following station
Rensselaer toward Chicago	Cardinal 1986–1994	Crawfordsville toward New York
Rensselaer toward Chicago	Hoosier State 1980–1994	Crawfordsville toward Indianapolis
Chicago Terminus	Floridian 1975–1979	Bloomington toward St. Petersburg or Miami
Former services at Monon station (North Street)
Preceding station	Monon Railroad	Following station
Battle Ground toward Chicago	Main Line	South Raubs toward Louisville
- Big Four Depot
- U.S. National Register of Historic Places
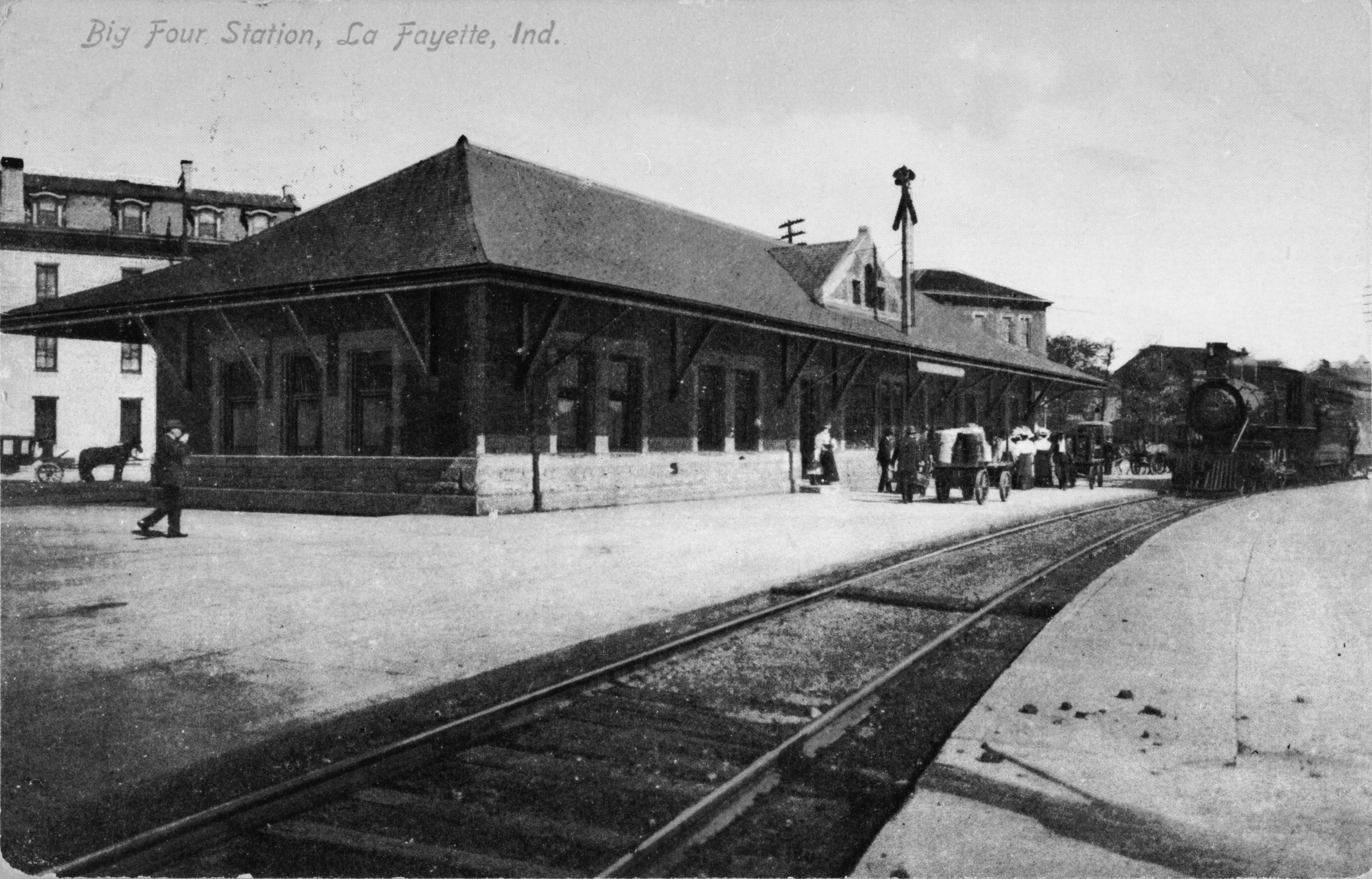
- c. 1910 Big Four Depot
- Interactive map of Big Four Depot
- Coordinates: 40°25′7″N 86°53′44″W
- Area: 8 acres (3 ha)
- Architect: Buckeye Chum Company
- Architectural style: Romanesque
- NRHP reference No.: 03000548
- Added to NRHP: June 22, 2003
Location

Lafayette station is an Amtrak station in Lafayette, Indiana, served by the Cardinal. The current station facility was established in 1994. The Amtrak train previously stopped in the middle of the city's 5th Street, near the former Monon Railroad depot. The station building was moved to its current location from the southeast corner of 2nd and South streets in September 1994. It is a Romanesque Revival style depot built in 1902 by the Lake Erie and Western Railroad and Cleveland, Cincinnati, Chicago and St. Louis Railway, as the Big Four Depot. The station was listed on the National Register of Historic Places in 2003.

== Significance ==
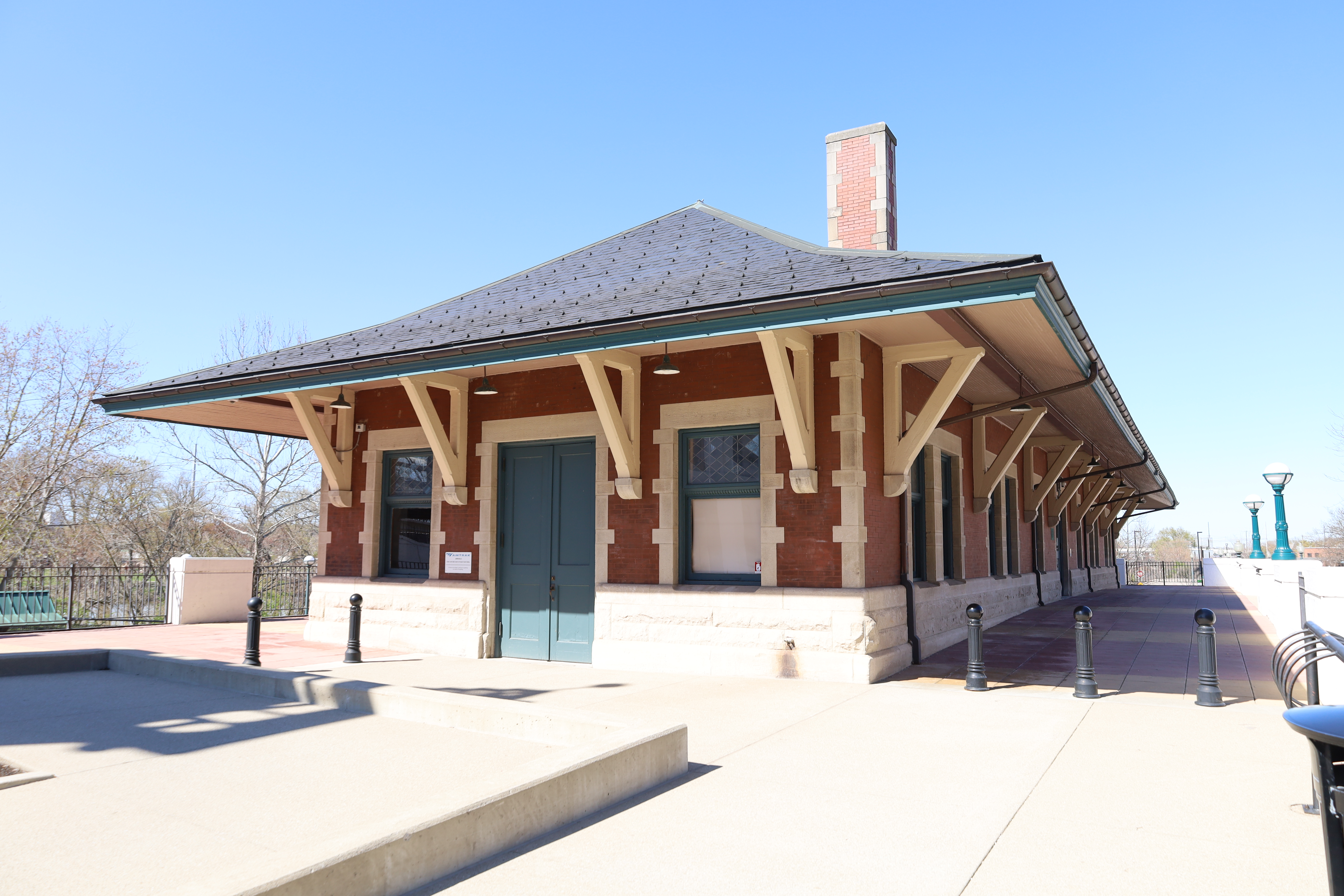
Side view in 2024

The building is an example of early twentieth century commercial architecture. It is one of two such structures in Indiana. It became part of the New York Central System, serving passengers through Lafayette between Cincinnati and Chicago. Lafayette was a major stop on this main artery of transportation for the NYC. Several trains operated through the station in earlier years of Amtrak, examples being the Floridian, James Whitcomb Riley and the Kentucky Cardinal.
