= Rensselaer station =

Train station in Indiana, US

Rensselaer, IN
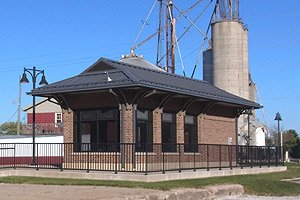
- Rensselaer station building in October 2015

General information
- Location: 776 North Cullen Street; Rensselaer, Indiana; United States
- Coordinates: 40.9432°N 87.1551°W
- Line: CSX Monon Subdivision
- Platforms: 1 side platform
- Tracks: 1

Construction
- Accessible: yes

Other information
- Station code: Amtrak: REN

History
- Opened: April 26, 1981
- Rebuilt: 2011–2013

Passengers
- FY 2025: 430 (Amtrak)

Services
Preceding station	Amtrak	Following station
Dyer toward Chicago	Cardinal	Lafayette toward New York
Former services
Preceding station	Amtrak	Following station
Dyer toward Chicago	Hoosier State	Lafayette toward Indianapolis
Dyer toward Chicago	Kentucky Cardinal	Lafayette toward Louisville
Preceding station	Monon Railroad	Following station
Surrey toward Chicago	Main Line	Pleasant Ridge toward Louisville
Location

Rensselaer station is an Amtrak station in Rensselaer, Indiana, served by the Cardinal. It was additionally served by the Hoosier State until 2019, when funding for the train was cut.

== History ==
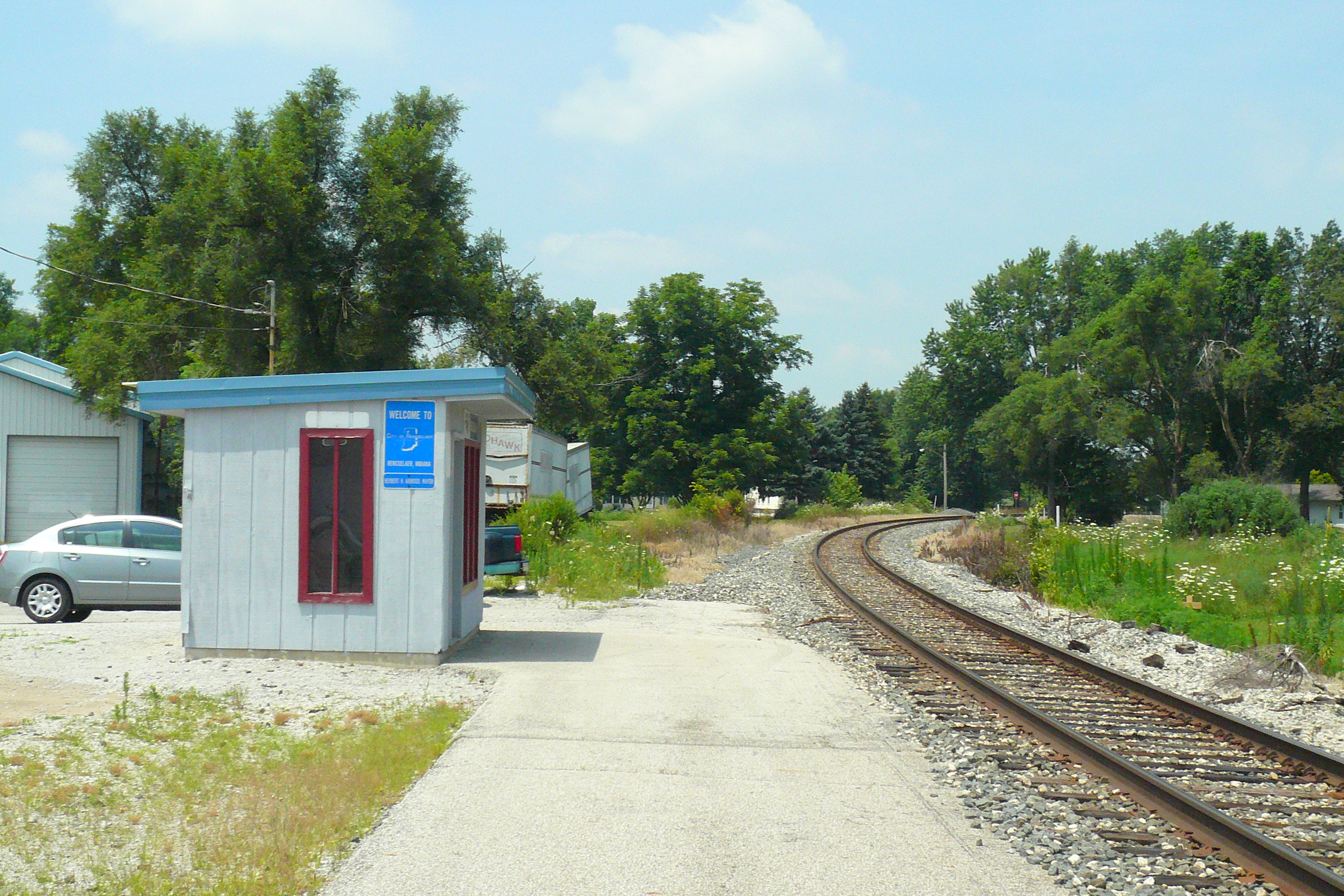
The 1981-built shelter in 2010

A small shelter at Rensselaer was built in 1981 and maintained by the local Lions Club. The former Monon Railroad station was demolished in 1981, and preceding this station was a two-story wooden depot built in 1900. Some of the brick pavement and red tile flooring from the second station is still visible today.

In 2007, the shelter was renovated. Vandalized windows were replaced, and the exterior was repainted. The station was vandalized again in 2014.

A new accessible concrete platform was constructed with funds from the 2009 stimulus bill. The platform, which cost around $500,000, was dedicated on April 20, 2011. The 1979-built shelter was later demolished and replaced with a one-story brick building, funded by Amtrak, which opened on August 21, 2013.

In December 2017, the station's concrete platform suffered damage in a 16-car derailment, triggered by a wheel detachment from a train car. The damage was not repaired until Summer 2024, when new LED lighting was installed and accessibility features were improved.

== Services ==
The station interior features benches, a small heater, and electrical outlets. The building is unstaffed and does not feature restrooms, ticketing, baggage services, or vending. A small parking area exists to the west of the station. As of FY 2023, Rensselaer is the fifth least-used Amtrak station in the network.
