= Dyer station =

Railroad station in Dyer, Indiana

Dyer, IN
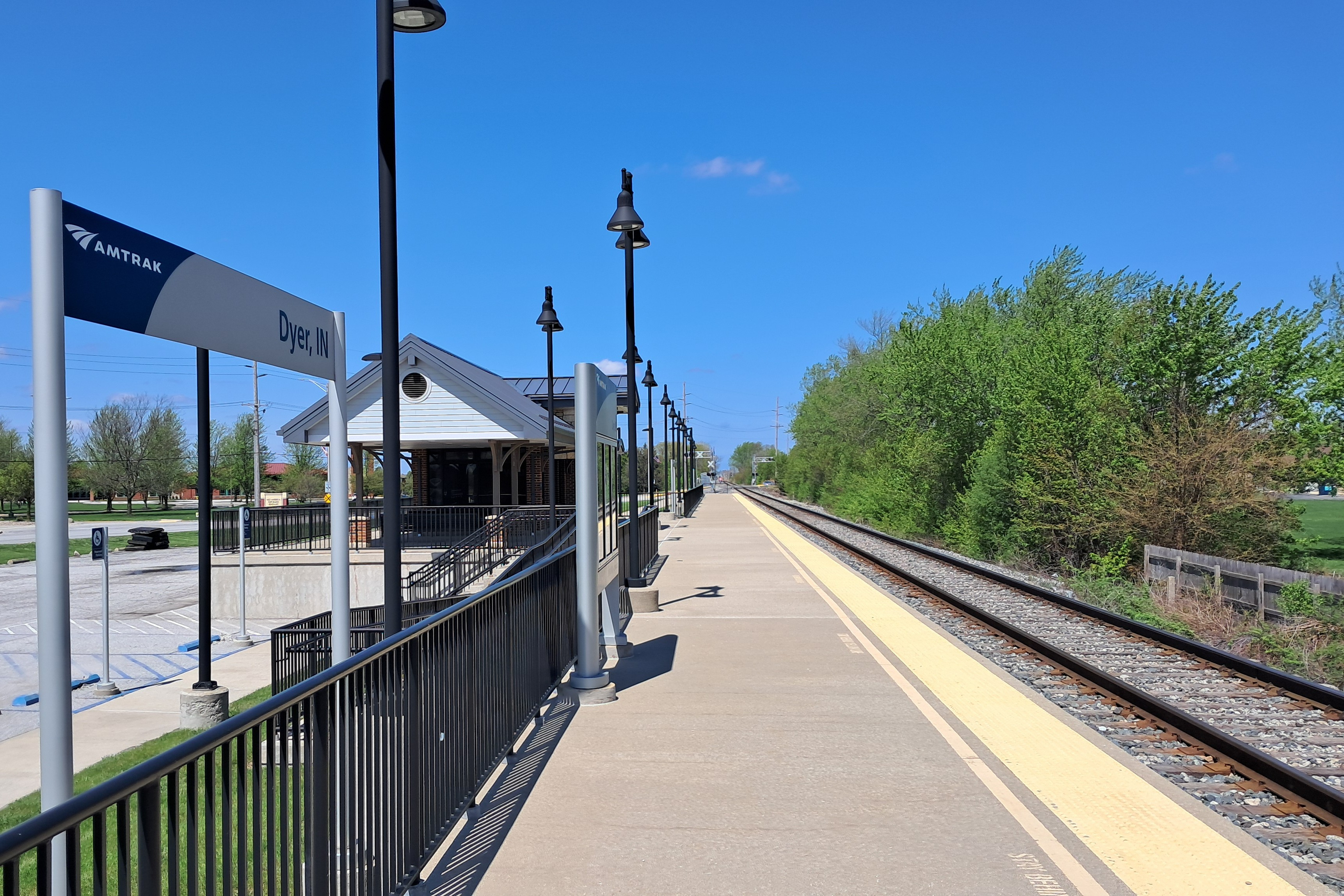
- Dyer station in April 2026

General information
- Location: 913 Sheffield Avenue; Dyer, Indiana; United States
- Coordinates: 41.5154°N 87.5181°W
- Owner: Amtrak
- Line: CSX Monon Subdivision
- Platforms: 1 side platform
- Tracks: 1

Construction
- Accessible: Yes

Other information
- Station code: Amtrak: DYE

History
- Opened: October 1, 1980
- Rebuilt: 1986, 2014

Passengers
- FY 2025: 1,331 (Amtrak)

Services
| Preceding station | Amtrak | Following station |
|---|---|---|
| Chicago Terminus | Cardinal | Rensselaer toward New York |
Former services
| Preceding station | Amtrak | Following station |
|---|---|---|
| Chicago Terminus | Hoosier State | Rensselaer toward Indianapolis |
| Chicago Terminus | Kentucky Cardinal | Rensselaer toward Louisville |
Location

Dyer station is an Amtrak station in Dyer, Indiana, served by the Cardinal route. It is located north of an at-grade crossing of two railroad lines; CSX (formerly the Monon Railroad) and the Elgin, Joliet & Eastern. The town's original depot stood at the diamond junction itself.

== History ==
Dyer station opened on October 1, 1980, with commencement of the Hoosier State. The site was selected by Amtrak as the location in town which would cause the least interference with freight trains.

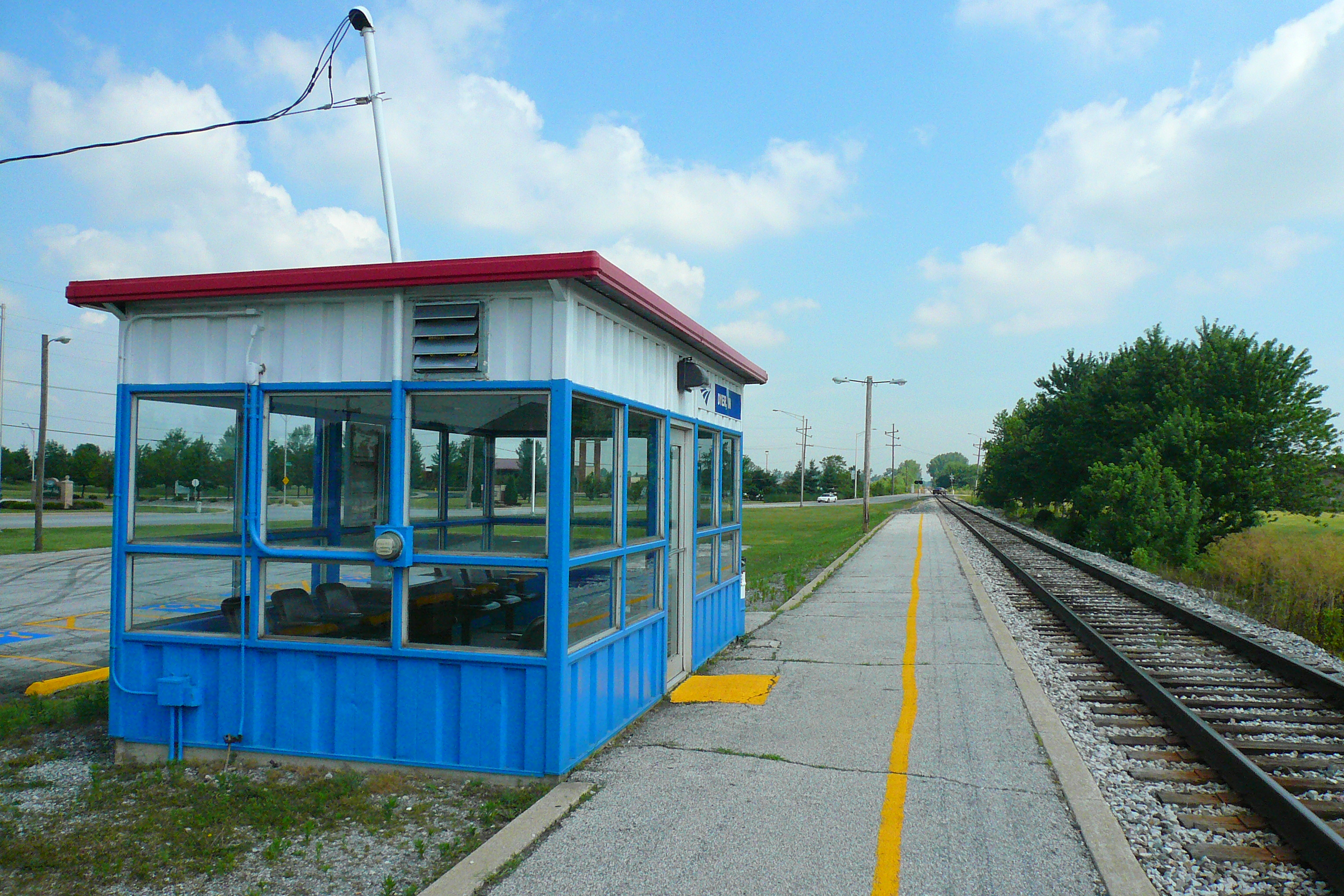
The 1986 shelter with old platform edge, as seen in 2010.

The station's facilities were merely an "Amshack" shelter with seats built in 1986. It was renovated in 2014 in a project which demolished the shelter and constructed a larger station house which was accessible, and repaved the platform and parking lot.

The Monon Corridor commuter rail line, which opened in 2026, terminates about 1/2 mile (0.8 km) north at Munster/Dyer station.
