= Jeffersonville station =

Train station in Jeffersonville, Indiana, US (1999–2003)

Jeffersonville, IN
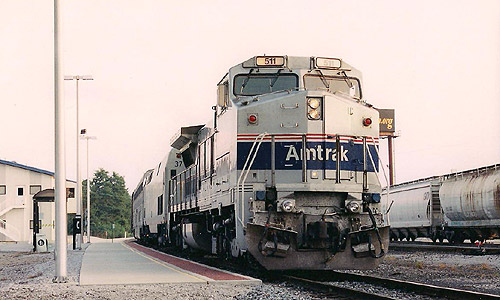
- The Kentucky Cardinal at Jeffersonville in August 2001

General information
- Location: 500 Willinger Lane; Jeffersonville, Indiana, US
- Coordinates: 38°18′6″N 85°45′5″W
- System: Amtrak regional rail station
- Platforms: 1 side platform

Other information
- Station code: LJV

History
- Opened: December 17, 1999
- Closed: July 6, 2003

Former services
Preceding station	Amtrak	Following station
Indianapolis toward Chicago	Kentucky Cardinal	Louisville Terminus
Location

Jeffersonville

General information
- Location: Mitchell Avenue; Jeffersonville, Indiana
- System: Pennsylvania Railroad regional rail station

History
- Opened: 1929

Former services
Preceding station	Pennsylvania Railroad	Following station
Sellersburg toward Chicago	Chicago – Louisville	Louisville Terminus
Location

Jeffersonville station refers to one of two former train stations in Jeffersonville, Indiana, United States. The first, a Pennsylvania Railroad station, operated beginning in 1929 and is currently preserved in a new location. The newer station was opened by Amtrak in 1999 as part of the Kentucky Cardinal service and closed in 2003 after that service was terminated.

== Original Pennsylvania Railroad station ==
The Pennsylvania Railroad opened a passenger station in Jeffersonville in 1929 on Mitchell Avenue. In 1937, the station was used to evacuate people affected by the Ohio River flood of 1937.

After its passenger service terminated, management of the station facility was turned over to Jeff–Clark Preservation, a volunteer group, in 1985. The station was relocated, and it came under the management of the Jeffersonville Main Street group in 2019 for future preservation. Presently, it is known as Preservation Station.

== New Amtrak station ==
In November 1999, public speculation arose regarding the possibility of Amtrak service returning to the Louisville region after the discontinuation of the Floridian in 1979. It was reported by local news media that the Jeffersonville government had sold two acres of land to the Louisville and Indiana Railroad, which owned the railroad tracks in the area. The land was reportedly to be used for the potential construction of a new Amtrak station in Jeffersonville.

In early December, Amtrak announced the upcoming opening of the new Jeffersonville station, constructed on Willinger Lane, and the start of the Kentucky Cardinal service. Originally, Jeffersonville served as the southern terminus of the route; plans to extend the service to nearby Louisville were discussed but not immediately implemented.

The first train to the station traveled on December 17, 1999, marking the station's opening date. With the Kentucky Cardinal service, Amtrak eliminated the Greyhound shuttle service that had previously operated from the Jeffersonville area to carry passengers to train connections in Indianapolis. The station's opening was generally received positively by local government leaders, who emphasized the new connections for the region's residents to the rest of Amtrak's routes.

On July 6, 2003, less than four years after the station's opening, Amtrak discontinued the Kentucky Cardinal service as a result of poor ridership.

== Potential future reopening ==
As recently as 2023, it has been reported that Amtrak is considering reestablishing service to the Louisville region, including Jeffersonville.
