= Crawfordsville station =

Amtrak railway station in Indiana, US

Crawfordsville, IN
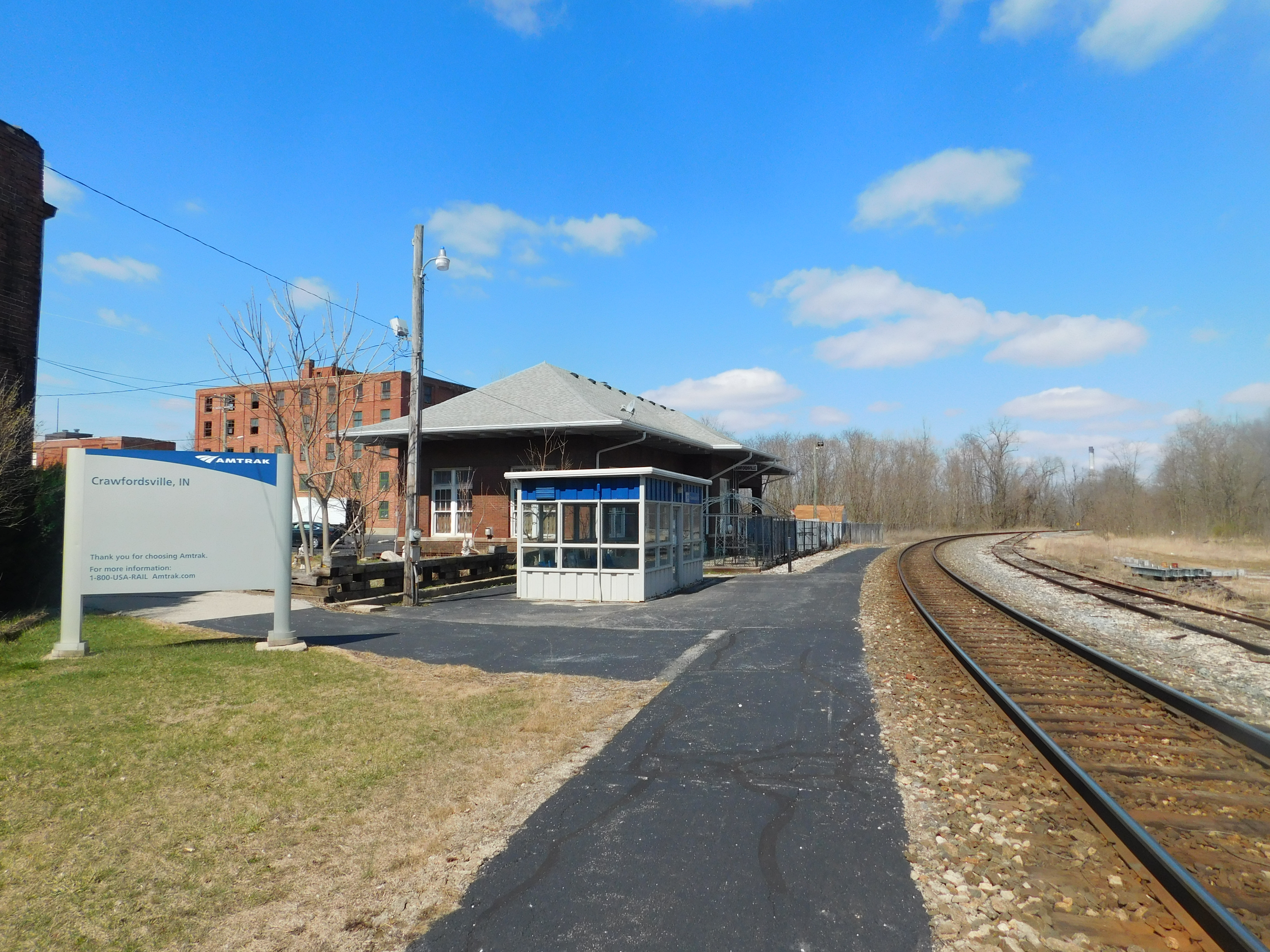
- Crawfordsville station in March 2017

General information
- Location: 410 North Green Street; Crawfordsville, Indiana; United States
- Coordinates: 40.0447°N 86.8992°W
- Line: CSX Lafayette Subdivision
- Platforms: 1 side platform
- Tracks: 1

Other information
- Station code: Amtrak: CRF

History
- Opened: 1926
- Closed: September 30, 1967
- Rebuilt: October 1, 1980; 2005–2006

Passengers
- 2017: 5,932 ▲2.74%
- FY 2025: 1,928 (Amtrak)

Services
Preceding station	Amtrak	Following station
Lafayette toward Chicago	Cardinal	Indianapolis toward New York
Former services
Preceding station	Amtrak	Following station
Lafayette toward Chicago	Hoosier State	Indianapolis Terminus
Lafayette toward Chicago	Kentucky Cardinal	Indianapolis toward Louisville
Preceding station	Monon Railroad	Following station
Manchester toward Chicago	Main Line	Ames toward Louisville
- Monon Railroad Depot
- U.S. Historic district – Contributing property
- Part of: Crawfordsville Commercial Historic District (ID92000183)
- Designated CP: March 25, 1992
Location

Crawfordsville station is an Amtrak intercity rail station in Crawfordsville, Indiana, served by the Cardinal.

== History ==
The original station was built in 1926 by the Monon Railroad, which it served until September 30, 1967.

Amtrak service commenced in Crawfordsville on October 1, 1980. The depot was purchased by Nancy Morris from CSX and renovated in 2004 into a physical therapy clinic and a banquet room. Amtrak currently uses a shelter station immediately adjacent to the original depot.

=== Renovation ===
The shelter station was in poor condition in 2005 when seniors at Crawfordsville Senior High School began renovating it in a project which soon attracted national attention. They applied for grants and obtained material from local merchants. Trains Magazine reported that the students painted the station, reglazed the windows, repaired the ventilation system and lighting, and planted a flower garden outside, removing 60 bags of trash. The refurbished station had a grand reopening the following May.

In recognition of their efforts, Amtrak gave its "Champions of the Rails" award to the Crawfordsville High School class of 2006. The students spoke to Amtrak officials in Chicago and also traveled to Washington, D.C., to address members of the National Association of Railroad Passengers and of the United States Congress.
