= Hoosier State (train) =

Former Amtrak train service between Chicago and Indianapolis

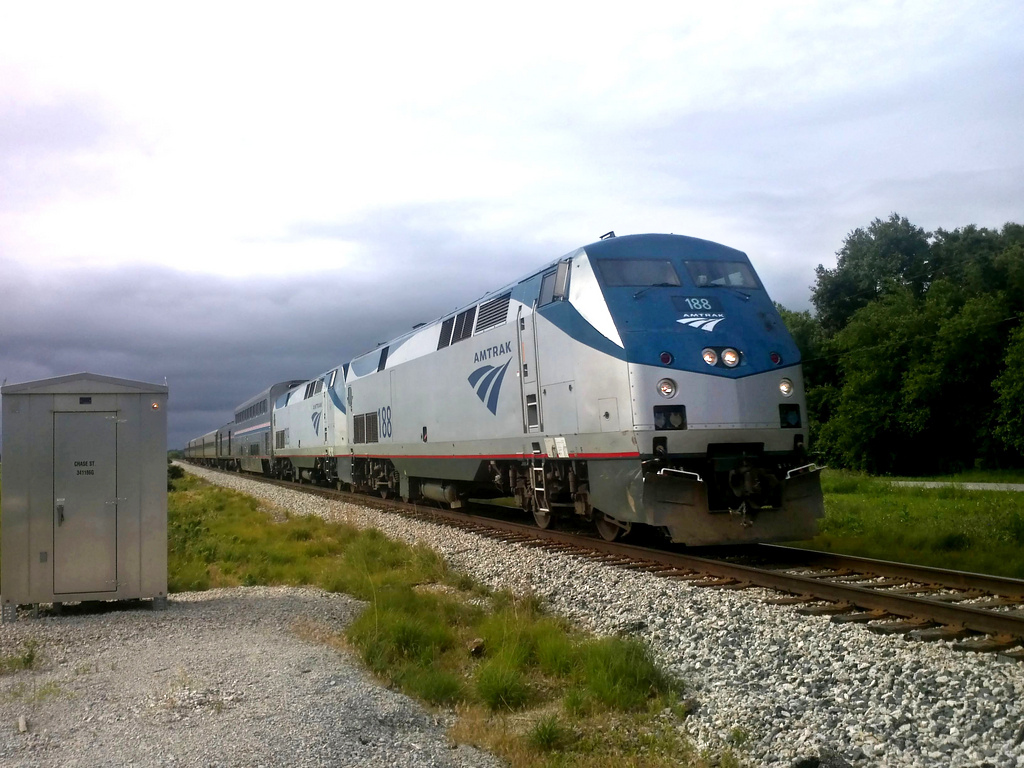
- The Hoosier State in Shelby, Indiana in 2011

Overview
- Service type: Inter-city rail
- Status: Discontinued
- Predecessor: Kentucky Cardinal (2003)
- First service: October 1, 1980
- Last service: June 30, 2019
- Former operator: Amtrak
- Annual ridership: 20,853 (FY19)

Route
- Termini: Chicago; Indianapolis
- Stops: 4
- Distance travelled: 196 miles (315 km)
- Service frequency: Quad-weekly
- Train number: 850–851

Technical
- Rolling stock: Amfleet coaches
- Operating speed: 60 mph (97 km/h) (top)
- Track owners: CSX; Union Pacific; Belt Railway of Chicago; Metra; Norfolk Southern

The Hoosier State was a 196-mile (315 km) passenger train service operated by Amtrak between Chicago and Indianapolis. It ran on the four days each week that the Cardinal did not run, giving daily rail service to the Chicago–Indianapolis corridor.

The Hoosier State was discontinued on June 30, 2019, after funding for the train went unwritten into Indiana's 2019 state budget. The Cardinal continues to provide three round trips per week between Chicago and Indianapolis.

== History ==
=== Prior service ===
Prior to the formation of Amtrak, the Chicago–Indianapolis market was served by several daily trains, the Pennsylvania Railroad's South Wind and Kentuckian, and the New York Central's James Whitcomb Riley, Indianapolis Special, and Sycamore. There is a name antecedent to the train. The Monon Railroad ran the Hoosier daily between Chicago and Indianapolis. With the creation of Amtrak, riders were served by the South Wind and the George Washington/James Whitcomb Riley. However, with Penn Central's financial instability, track maintenance in the Midwest suffered. Amtrak shifted both trains to other routes through Indiana, leaving Indianapolis to be served only by the National Limited (formerly the Spirit of St. Louis), which ran between New York and Kansas City.

The National Limited's discontinuance in 1979 severed Indianapolis from the national rail network, and isolated Amtrak's Beech Grove Shops in the Indianapolis suburb of Beech Grove. The passenger carrier had been using the National Limited to ferry railroad cars to and from its shops; it was forced to run special trains to Indianapolis instead.

=== Hoosier State ===
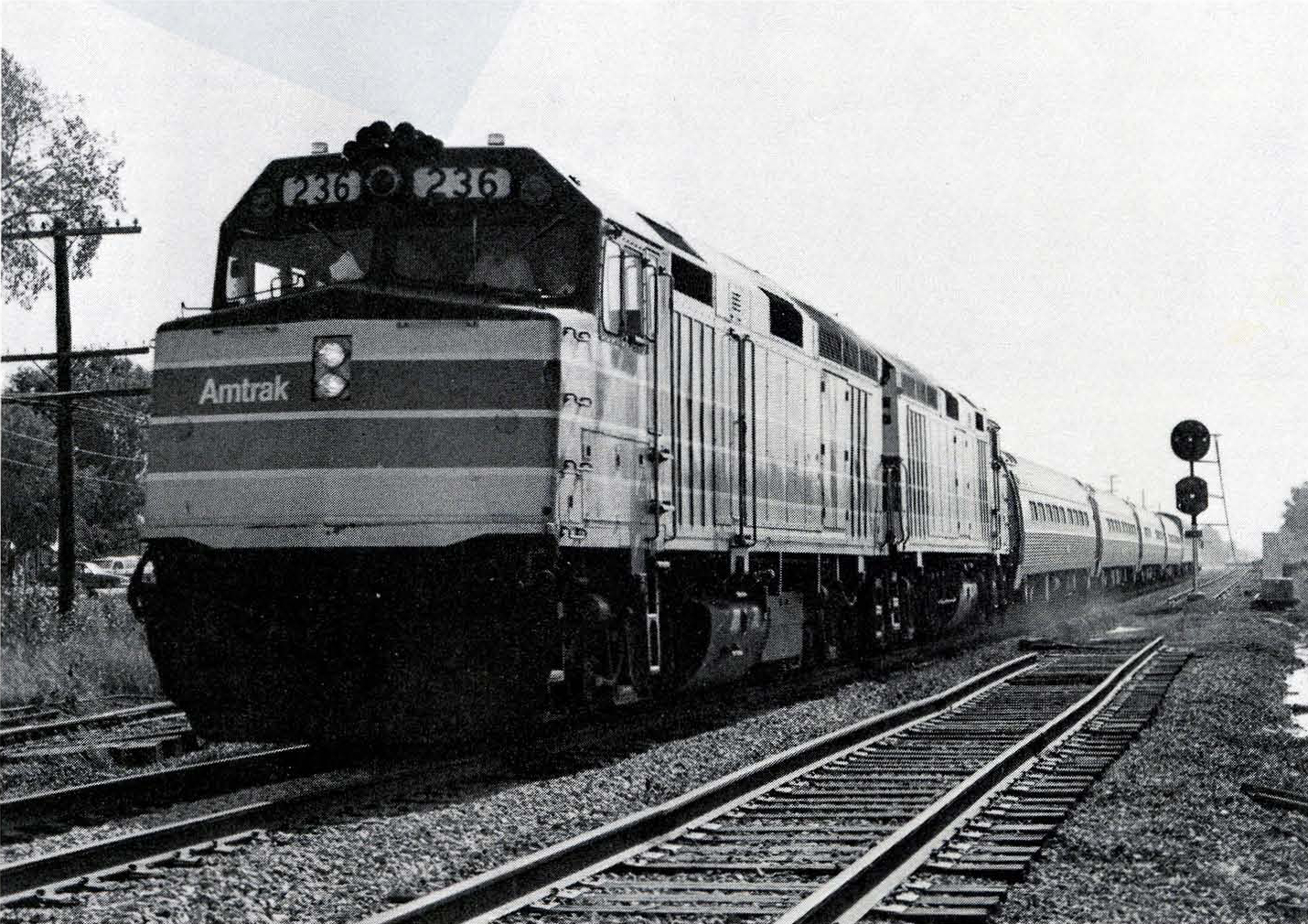
The first northbound Hoosier State on October 3, 1980

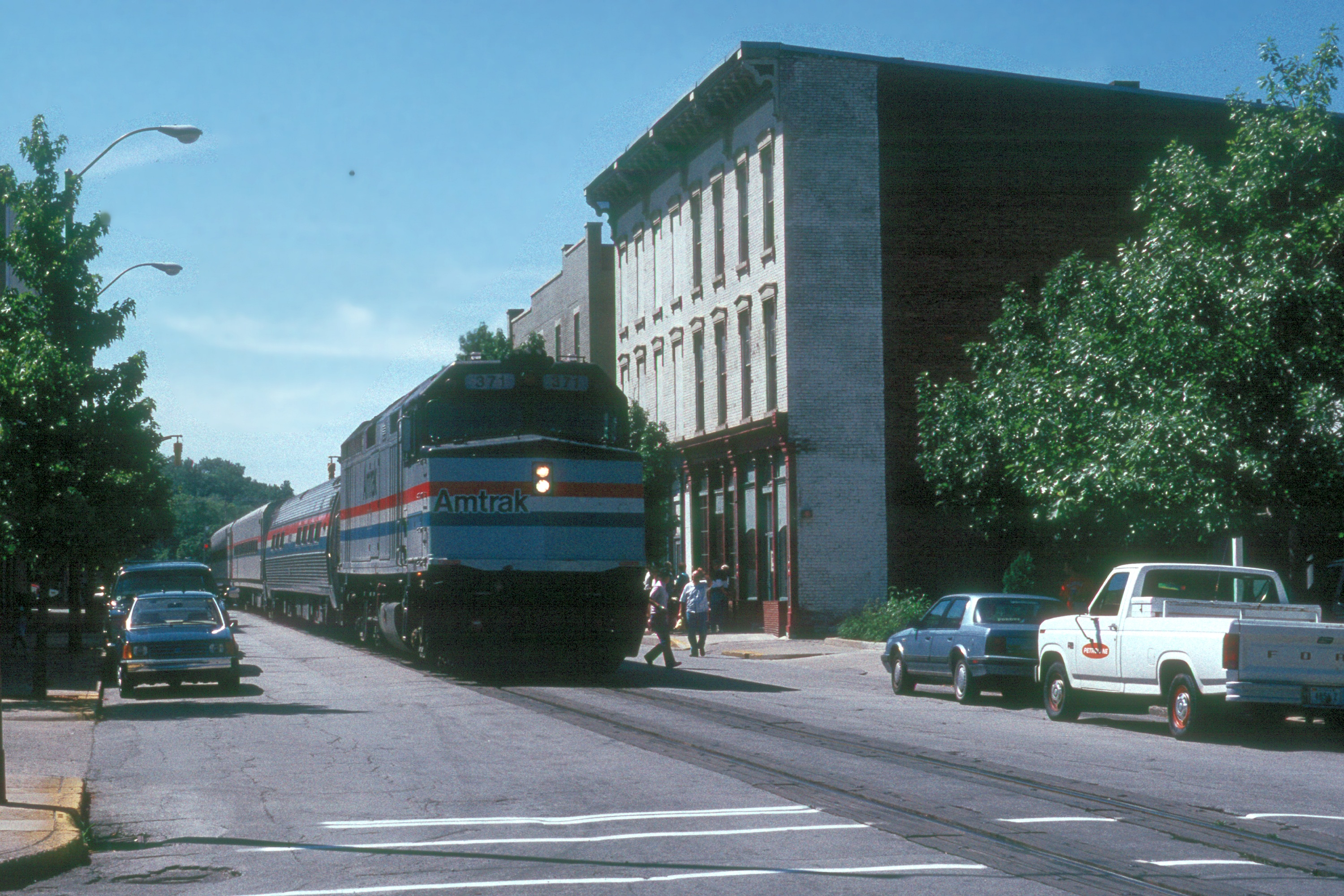
Until 1994, the Hoosier State had a section of on-street running in Lafayette

The Hoosier State commenced on October 1, 1980. On April 27, 1986, the Cardinal (formerly the James Whitcomb Riley) was rerouted to use the same tracks as the Hoosier State between Chicago and Indianapolis, and the Hoosier State began running on days the Cardinal did not operate. The Hoosier State was restored to daily operation on a separate schedule from the Cardinal on October 25, 1987. However, funding cuts led to its discontinuance on September 8, 1995, while the Cardinal continued tri-weekly operation between Chicago, Indianapolis, and the East Coast. Amtrak restored the Hoosier State on July 19, 1998, as a tri-weekly, later quad-weekly train. Northbound trains departed Indianapolis on Sunday, Tuesday, Wednesday, and Friday mornings, while southbound trains departed Chicago on Sunday, Monday, Wednesday, and Friday afternoons.

=== Kentucky Cardinal ===
On December 17, 1999, the Hoosier State was extended south from Indianapolis to Louisville, Kentucky, and renamed the Kentucky Cardinal. It was also expanded to a full-fledged daily train. On the three days the Cardinal operated, the Kentucky Cardinal operated as a section, splitting in Indianapolis. For the rest of the week, it ran independently to Chicago. However, the Kentucky Cardinal was plagued by extremely slow speeds along its Indianapolis-to-Louisville leg—as slow as 30 mph (48 km/h) in some places—making it slower than automobile traffic along the same stretch of Interstate 65. Amtrak discontinued the Kentucky Cardinal on July 4, 2003, and brought back the Hoosier State on its pre-1999 schedule, operating four days a week in tandem with the Cardinal.

=== State funding ===
On October 16, 2008, the Passenger Rail Investment and Improvement Act of 2008 (PRIIA) was signed into law, requiring states to bear the operating and capital costs of intercity rail passenger service on Amtrak routes of not more than 750 mi (1,210 km) within 5 years. At a length of 196 mi (315 km), the Hoosier State was affected by this provision of PRIIA, and the State of Indiana became responsible for funding the Hoosier State beginning on October 1, 2013.

Faced with termination of a service that would have left the Chicago–Indianapolis corridor with only thrice-weekly train service, state and local officials arrived at a deal to share the $3 million annual cost of the service, becoming the last state in the nation to arrive at a deal to save its short-distance train line on October 15, 2013. Operating costs above ticket revenue continue to be covered by the Indiana Department of Transportation and communities along the route.

Indiana sought alternatives to Amtrak operation and, on June 24, 2014, selected Corridor Capital, a Chicago-based rail passenger services development company, as its preferred vendor to manage and operate the service. Planning was underway for the company to take over the service as early as October 1, 2014. However, Corridor Capital did not meet that deadline and Indiana Department of Transportation (INDOT) discontinued negotiations with the company in November 2014. Amtrak continued to operate the train service under short-term contract extensions while the state considered alternative vendors.

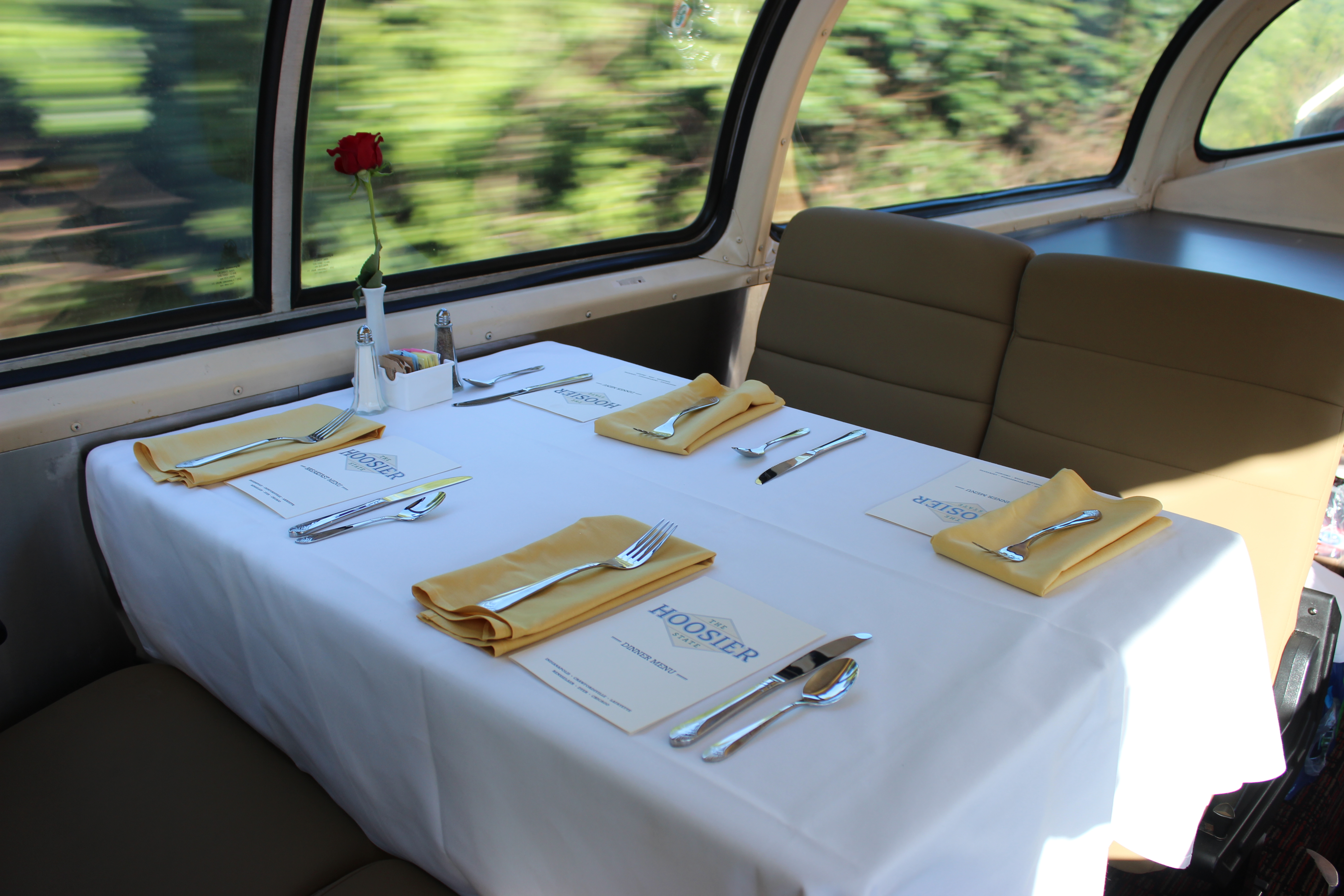
During the Iowa Pacific era, the Hoosier State was the only short-haul Amtrak train featuring full dining service; business class patrons dined in a vintage dome car.

On March 6, 2015, INDOT announced that the Hoosier State would discontinue service on April 1, 2015. The decision was made due to regulations of the Federal Railroad Administration that would have required the state of Indiana to act as a rail carrier, despite the state owning no tracks or trains, which—according to INDOT—would have increased the cost to Indiana taxpayers for no additional benefit. After Indiana appealed to the FRA, the train's operation was extended to April 30, while Amtrak continued to operate the Hoosier State under a short-term agreement while negotiations continued.

=== Iowa Pacific operation ===
On August 2, 2015, INDOT contracted with Iowa Pacific and Amtrak in order to continue the Hoosier State, with Iowa Pacific responsible for providing and maintaining equipment, food service, and marketing, and Amtrak responsible for providing ticketing services and train operating crews (engineers, assistant engineers, conductors, and assistant conductors). The contract had four option years.

Once the service improvements instituted by Iowa Pacific took hold, including the addition of full-service dining, onboard Wi-Fi, business-class service, and a dome car, ridership began increasing and was up 5.8% in July 2016 over the previous July, with FY 2016 (October 2015–July 2016) revenues up 32.8% from the prior year.

On January 30, 2017, INDOT announced that Iowa Pacific was no longer able to fulfill the contract and had asked to be released from the contract early, prior to its original end date of June 30, 2017. As a result, the equipment and personnel provided by Iowa Pacific were withdrawn and replaced by Amtrak equipment and on-board services personnel in advance of March 1 run of the westbound train from Indianapolis.

=== Service cancellation and replacement ===
In February 2019, Indiana governor Eric Holcomb proposed a budget that did not include funding for the Hoosier State, saying that the train did not have enough ridership to justify a subsidy. Environmentalists were disappointed by the decision, contending that the loss of the train service would increase the use of passenger cars by citing a 2016 Amtrak survey that found 57 percent of passengers in Indiana would drive to their destination if the service was canceled. On April 8, 2019, Amtrak announced that unless state funding was restored, the Hoosier State would end on June 30, 2019. Passengers who had already purchased Hoosier State tickets for travel after that date would be compensated with Cardinal tickets. The budget passed on April 24 without Hoosier State funding. On June 30, the Hoosier State officially made its final run.

In May 2019, a private transportation company, OurBus, announced plans to start a two-month pilot of daily round trip bus service between Indianapolis and Chicago to fill the gap left by the Hoosier State. OurBus charged a $10 introductory rate before raising fares to between $25 and $35. The OurBus route included stops in Zionsville and Lafayette in Indiana. Other stops along the route would be added if at least 100 people make the request. Gold Shield Transportation is contracted to provide the bus service.

In 2021, Amtrak developed a plan to bring service between Chicago, Indianapolis, and Louisville/Cincinnati which if implemented, could include up to eight daily round trips from Chicago to Louisville/Cincinnati, all of which would almost certainly go through Indianapolis and almost certainly travel along the former Hoosier State route. This new proposal was supported by the 2021 bipartisan infrastructure bill, but full implementation would take several years. In 2025, state officials indicated plans to resume Chicago–Indianapolis service with two daily round trips independent from the Cardinal. A proposed service operator and equipment had not been determined by that time.

== Route details ==
The Hoosier State operated over Amtrak, CSX, Union Pacific, Metra, and Norfolk Southern trackage:

- CSX Indianapolis Subdivision, Indianapolis Terminal Subdivision, Crawfordsville Branch Subdivision, Monon Subdivision, and Eldson Subdivision Indianapolis to Thornton
- UP Villa Grove Subdivision, Thornton to 80th Street
- BRC, 80th Street Interlocking
- Metra SouthWest Service, 80th Street to 21st Street.
- NS Chicago Line, CP518 to 21st Street.

Intermediate station stops were made at Crawfordsville, Lafayette, Rensselaer, and Dyer - the same as those made by the Cardinal. (Unlike the Cardinal, the Hoosier State had Crawfordsville as a regular stop rather than a flag stop.) The train was scheduled for a five-hour running time over the 196-mile (315 km) route.

== Ridership ==
Traffic by Fiscal Year (October–September)
	Ridership	Change over previous year	Ticket Revenue	Change over previous year
2007	26,347	-	$529,270	-
2008	31,774	▲20.59%	$681,685	▲28.79%
2009	31,384	▼1.22%	$677,755	▼0.57%
2010	33,600	▲7.06%	$796,094	▲17.46%
2011	37,249	▲10.86%	$836,057	▲5.01%
2012	36,669	▼1.55%	$856,675	▲2.46%
2013	36,768	▲0.26%	$892,553	▲4.18%
2014	33,930	▼7.71%	$802,581	▼10.08%
2015	29,703	▼12.45%	$711,481	▼11.35%
2016	29,488	▼0.72%	$968,296	▲36.09%
2017	30,000	▲1.73%	-	-
2018	27,876	▼7.08%	-	-
2019	20,853 (Note: Partial year; train was permanently suspended at the end of June 2019.)	▼25.19%	-	-

== Train consist ==
The standard Hoosier State consisted two coaches (generally Amtrak's short-distance Horizon equipment) and a Horizon or Amfleet cafe car. In addition to standard food service, the cafe car allowed for Business Class seating and complimentary WiFi. Motive power was commonly a General Electric Genesis P42DC locomotive. As the train was often used to shuttle equipment from the Beech Grove Shops to Chicago, deadhead equipment of all types could often be found in the consist as well. After Amtrak resumed operations in March 2017, the Great Dome car Ocean View was added.

While operated by Iowa Pacific, the train included Iowa Pacific owned ex-Atchison, Topeka and Santa Fe Railway Big Dome Summit View and three passenger cars, with power provided by a fleet of three ex-NJT GP40FH-2 diesel locomotives.
