= Indianapolis Union Station =

Historic train station in Indianapolis, Indiana, US

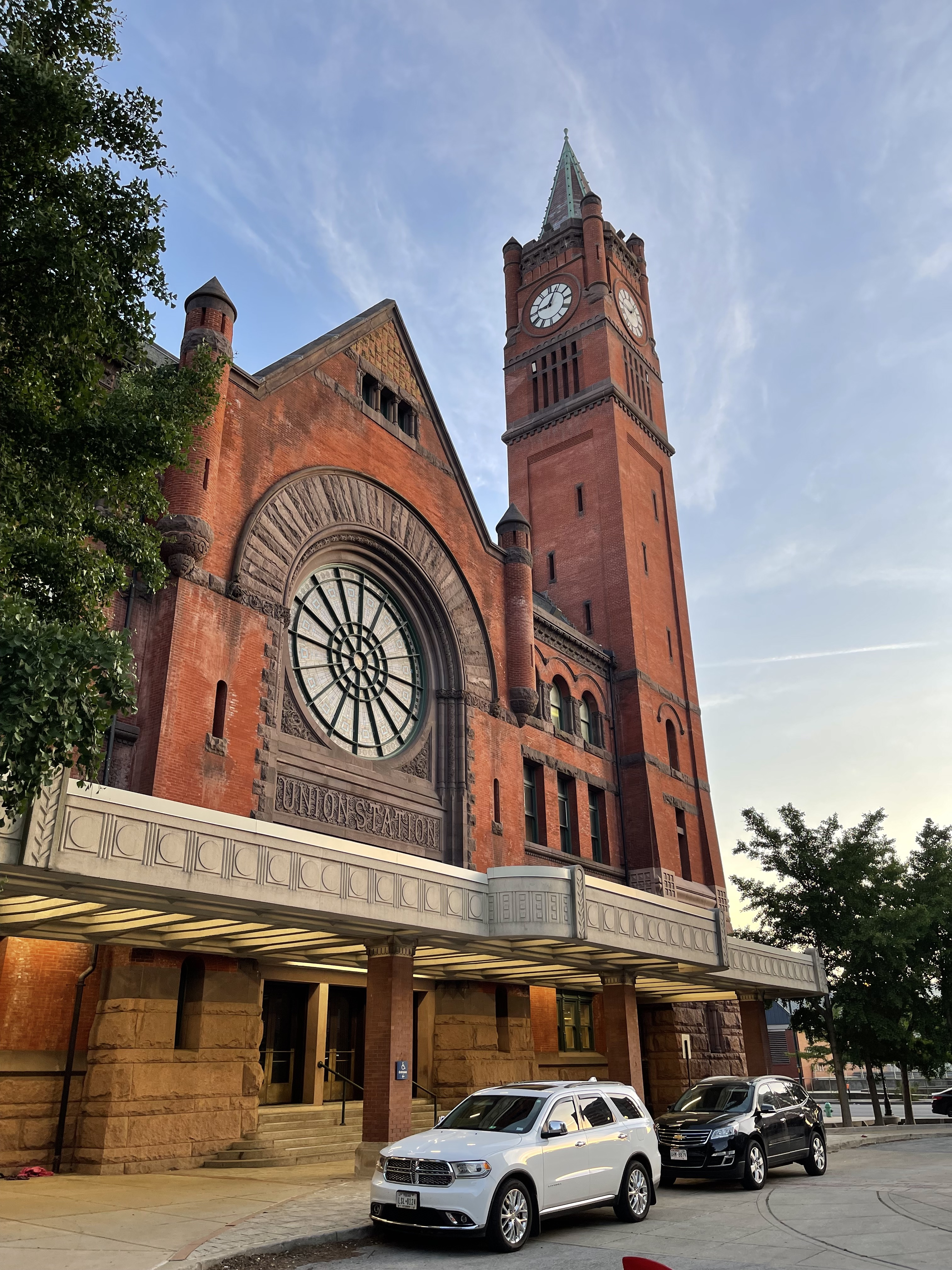
- Union Station, 2022

General information
- Location: 350 South Illinois Street; Indianapolis, Indiana; United States
- Owner: City of Indianapolis
- Platforms: 1 island platform (formerly more)
- Tracks: 2 (formerly 12)
- Connections: Burlington Trailways; Greyhound Lines

Construction
- Accessible: Yes

Other information
- Station code: Amtrak: IND

History
- Opened: September 20, 1853; 172 years ago
- Rebuilt: 1888, 1984, 2002

Passengers
- FY 2025: 12,655 (Amtrak)

Services
Preceding station	Amtrak	Following station
Crawfordsville toward Chicago	Cardinal	Connersville toward New York
Former services
Preceding station	Amtrak	Following station
Crawfordsville toward Chicago	Hoosier State	Terminus
Crawfordsville toward Chicago	Kentucky Cardinal	Jeffersonville toward Louisville
Terre Haute toward Kansas City	National Limited	Richmond toward New York or Washington, D.C.
Logansport toward Chicago	Floridian 1971–1975	Louisville toward St. Petersburg or Miami
Lafayette 1971–1972 toward Chicago–Central	Floridian 1971–1975	Louisville toward St. Petersburg or Miami
Lafayette toward Chicago	James Whitcomb Riley and George Washington 1971–1974	Cincinnati (River Road) toward Washington, D.C. or Newport News
Preceding station	Baltimore and Ohio Railroad	Following station
Speedway toward Springfield	Springfield – Hamilton	New Palestine toward Hamilton
Preceding station	Illinois Central Railroad	Following station
Frances toward Effingham	Effingham – Indianapolis	Terminus
Preceding station	Monon Railroad	Following station
Massachusetts Avenue toward Monon	Monon – Indianapolis	Terminus
Preceding station	New York Central Railroad	Following station
Terre Haute toward St. Louis	Big Four Route Main Line	Anderson toward Cleveland
Avon toward St. Louis	Big Four Route Main Line	Lawrence toward Cleveland
Augusta toward Chicago	Chicago – Cincinnati	Beech Grove toward Cincinnati
Brownsburg toward Peoria	Peoria & Eastern Railway	Terminus
Terminus	Indianapolis – Springfield	Massachusetts Avenue toward Springfield, OH
Preceding station	Nickel Plate Road	Following station
Massachusetts Avenue toward Michigan City	Michigan City – Indianapolis	Terminus
Preceding station	Pennsylvania Railroad	Following station
Lebanon toward Chicago	Chicago – Louisville	Southport toward Louisville
Bridgeport toward St. Louis	St. Louis – Pittsburgh	Cumberland toward Pittsburgh
Lebanon toward South Bend	South Bend – Indianapolis	Terminus
Maywood toward Vincennes	Vincennes – Indianapolis	Terminus
- Indianapolis Union Railroad Station
- U.S. National Register of Historic Places
- Interactive map of Indianapolis Union Railroad Station
- Location: 39 Jackson Place, Indianapolis
- Coordinates: 39°45′47″N 86°9′34″W
- Area: 1.3 acres (0.5 ha)
- Built: 1886–1888 (head house); 1915–1922 (train shed)
- Architect: Thomas Rodd
- Architectural style: Richardsonian Romanesque
- NRHP reference No.: 74000032
- Added to NRHP: July 19, 1974
Location

The Indianapolis Union Station is an intercity train station in the Wholesale District of Indianapolis, Indiana. Currently, Amtrak's Cardinal line serves the terminal, passing through Indianapolis three times a week each way.

Initially, Indianapolis created the world's first union station in 1848. Subsequently, the station building opened on September 20, 1853, at 39 Jackson Place, operated by the Indianapolis Union Railway. Later, a larger Richardsonian Romanesque station designed by Pittsburgh architect Thomas Rodd, was built at the same location starting in November 1886 and opened in September 1888. The head house (main waiting area and office) and clock tower of this second station still stand today.

Today, Amtrak, the national rail passenger carrier, continues to serve Union Station from a waiting area beneath the train shed. The station is served by the Cardinal (Chicago–New York City, via Cincinnati and Washington, DC), and was the eastern terminus of the Hoosier State until its discontinuation on June 30, 2019.

== Architecture ==
Thomas Rodd's design clearly shows the influence of architect Henry Hobson Richardson (1838–1886). Historian James R. Hetheringon concluded that Rodd, who was from Pittsburgh, studied the nearly completed Allegheny County Courthouse designed by Richardson before his death in 1886. Richardson considered the Courthouse his best work. It was highly influential, and Union Station is one of the oldest surviving examples of this style.

The three-story Union Station is built of granite and brick trimmed with Hummelstown brownstone. It features a battered water table and massive brick arches characteristic of the Romanesque style. Additionally, it includes an enormous rose window, slate roof, bartizans at section corners, and a soaring 185-foot (56 m) clock tower. The 1888 station also held a large street-level iron train shed.

== History ==
=== Early history ===
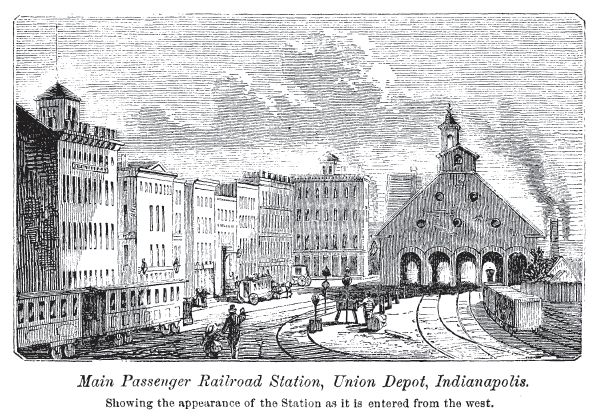
An 1865 illustration of the original Union Station depot

The first railroad to reach Indianapolis was the Madison and Indianapolis Railroad, which began service there in 1847. Competing railroads began connecting Indianapolis to other locations, but each had its own station in various parts of the young city, creating problems for passengers and freight alike. This problem was common to many U.S. cities, but Indianapolis was the first to solve it with a union station, which all railroads were to use. In August 1849, the Union Railway Company was formed, and it began to lay tracks to connect the various railroads. Then in 1853, it built a large brick train shed at the point where all the lines met. Between these dates, nearby Columbus, Ohio had built Columbus Union Station in 1851, becoming the first union station built. However, Indianapolis's station had more elements of a cooperative union station, especially as the Columbus station had one railroad lease space to another, while the Indianapolis station was a joint effort and ownership agreement.

As Indianapolis and its railroad traffic grew, the limitations of the original structure became increasingly obvious. In 1886, Thomas Rodd was hired. At the time, Rodd was employed by the Pennsylvania Railroad, but did independent civil engineering and architectural projects on the side. The new station was completed in 1888, and during 1889 320,996 passenger train cars (across 45,204 trains) and 861,991 freight cars passed through the station. In 1893, approximately 25,000 passengers rode an average of 120 passenger trains daily.

By 1900, over 200 trains a day were being serviced, forcing the station to eventually build an expansive train shed on an elevated platform (built from 1915 to 1922) so as not to interfere with regular street traffic. It was once second only to Chicago's Union Station as a Midwest railroad hub.

=== After World War II ===
In the 1940s, several railroads still called at the station: the Baltimore & Ohio, the Chicago, Indianapolis and Louisville Railroad (Monon Railroad), the Illinois Central, the New York Central, the New York, Chicago & St. Louis Railroad (Nickel Plate Road), and the Pennsylvania Railroad. After World War II, intercity passenger rail travel in the United States began to decline.

Passenger services, particularly named trains, at the union station included:

Operators	Named trains	Western or northern destination	Eastern or southern destination	Year discontinued
Amtrak	Cardinal	Chicago (Union Station)	New York, New York (Penn Station)	Still active
Amtrak	Hoosier State	Chicago	terminus	2019
Amtrak	James Whitcomb Riley	Chicago	New York	1974
Amtrak	Kentucky Cardinal	Chicago	Louisville, Kentucky (Union Station)	2003
Amtrak	National Limited	Kansas City (Union Station)	New York	1979
Amtrak	Floridian	Chicago (Union Station)	St. Petersburg or Miami	1979
Monon Railroad	Hoosier	Chicago	terminus	1959
Monon Railroad	Tippecanoe	Chicago	terminus	1959
New York Central	Corn Belt Special	Pekin, Illinois	terminus	1957
New York Central	Southwestern Limited / Knickerbocker	St. Louis, Missouri (Union Station)	New York	1967
New York Central	Cincinnati Special / Sycamore	Chicago (La Salle Street)	Cincinnati, Ohio (Union Station)	1967
Pennsylvania Railroad	Indianapolis Limited	terminus	New York (old Penn Station)	1957
Pennsylvania Railroad	Kentuckian	Chicago	Louisville (Union Station)	1968
Pennsylvania Railroad	St. Louisan	St. Louis	New York	1968
Pennsylvania Railroad, and Penn Central, 1967–1970	Penn Texas	St. Louis	New York (new Penn Station)	1970
Pennsylvania Railroad, and Penn Central, 1967–1971	South Wind	Chicago	St. Petersburg, Sarasota and Miami	1971
Pennsylvania Railroad, and Penn Central, 1967–1971	Spirit of St. Louis	St. Louis	New York	1971

=== Decline ===
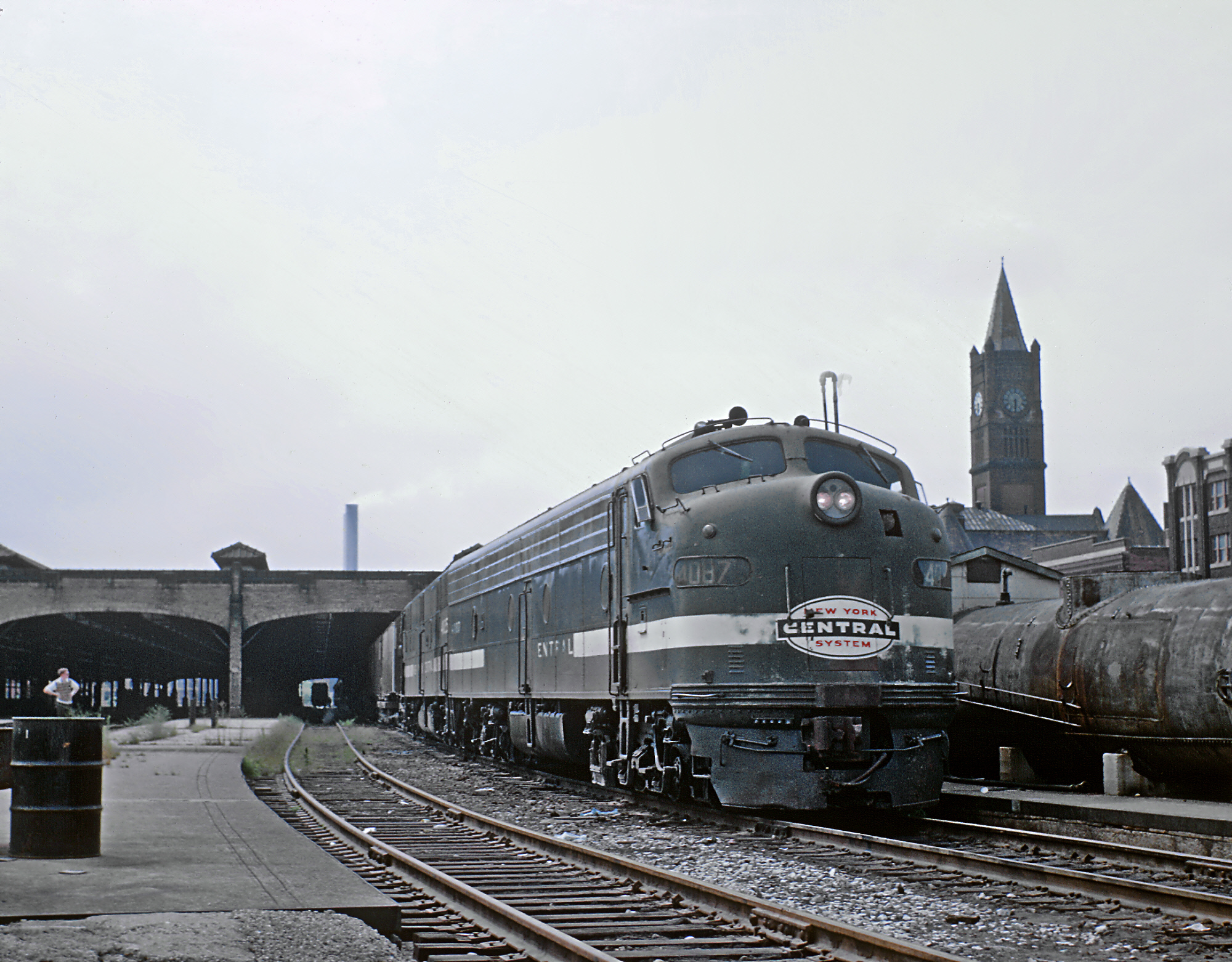
New York Central Railroad passenger train at Union Station in 1967

Throughout the 1960s and well into the Amtrak era, the number of train passengers declined to such a trickle that, in cities in which rail stations did not serve commuter traffic, most were allowed to physically decline to a point where many were closed and some demolished. Indianapolis's Union Station almost suffered that fate. By the late 1970s, vagrants and vandals had taken over much of the facility and numerous police and fire runs were made to the cavernous building. Local business and political leaders began looking for some way to preserve Union Station and transform it into a vital part of the city again. Also in the 1970s, Amtrak planned to run its proposed AutoTrak service out of the Indianapolis Union Station, but this planned service was ultimately scrapped.

In 1971, the city's mayor allocated $197,000 toward purchasing the building.

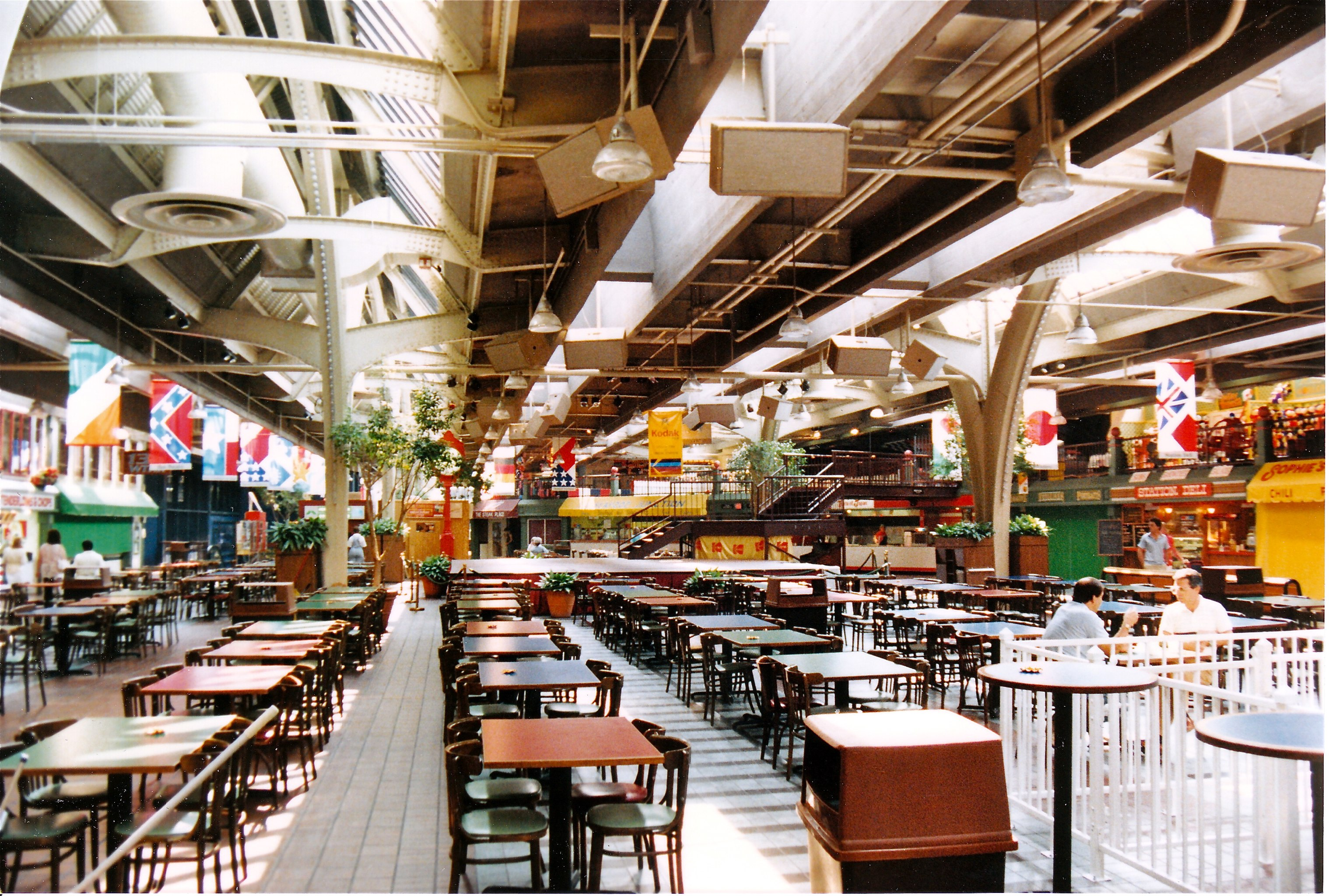
Interior of Union Station in 1988 following its conversion to a festival marketplace

The station was placed on the National Register of Historic Places on July 14, 1982. Beginning in 1984, the facility was renovated and converted from its primary use as a railroad station to a festival marketplace. The Indianapolis architecture firm of Woollen, Molzan and Partners was responsible for the restoration of the station's historic shed, which reopened in 1986. Union Station became a collection of restaurants, nightclubs, and specialty stores that included an NBC Store and a model train retailer. The eastern end of the former train platform area featured a large food court, plus several self-contained bars and nightclubs. Statues of individuals who might have been seen in the railroad station in prior years were installed throughout the facility. The 273-room Crowne Plaza Hotel took up much of the western portion of the train shed, with 26 of its rooms being housed within thirteen old Pullman cars.

In 1997, the facility's marketplace era concluded with the departure of the last non-hotel and non-transportation tenant: a Hooters restaurant, which relocated to another nearby downtown building. The September 1995 opening of the Circle Centre Mall, just a block to the north, had drawn off the overwhelming majority of Union Station's retail customers. A planned pedestrian bridge between these two structures had been denied by officials for historic preservation reasons, and a direct underground connection was deemed to not be economically feasible. The city of Indianapolis was forced to take ownership of Union Station and began to try to find another reuse for much of the building. After some time, it began leasing out space for a wide variety of purposes, including office use and an indoor go-kart track.

=== 21st century ===
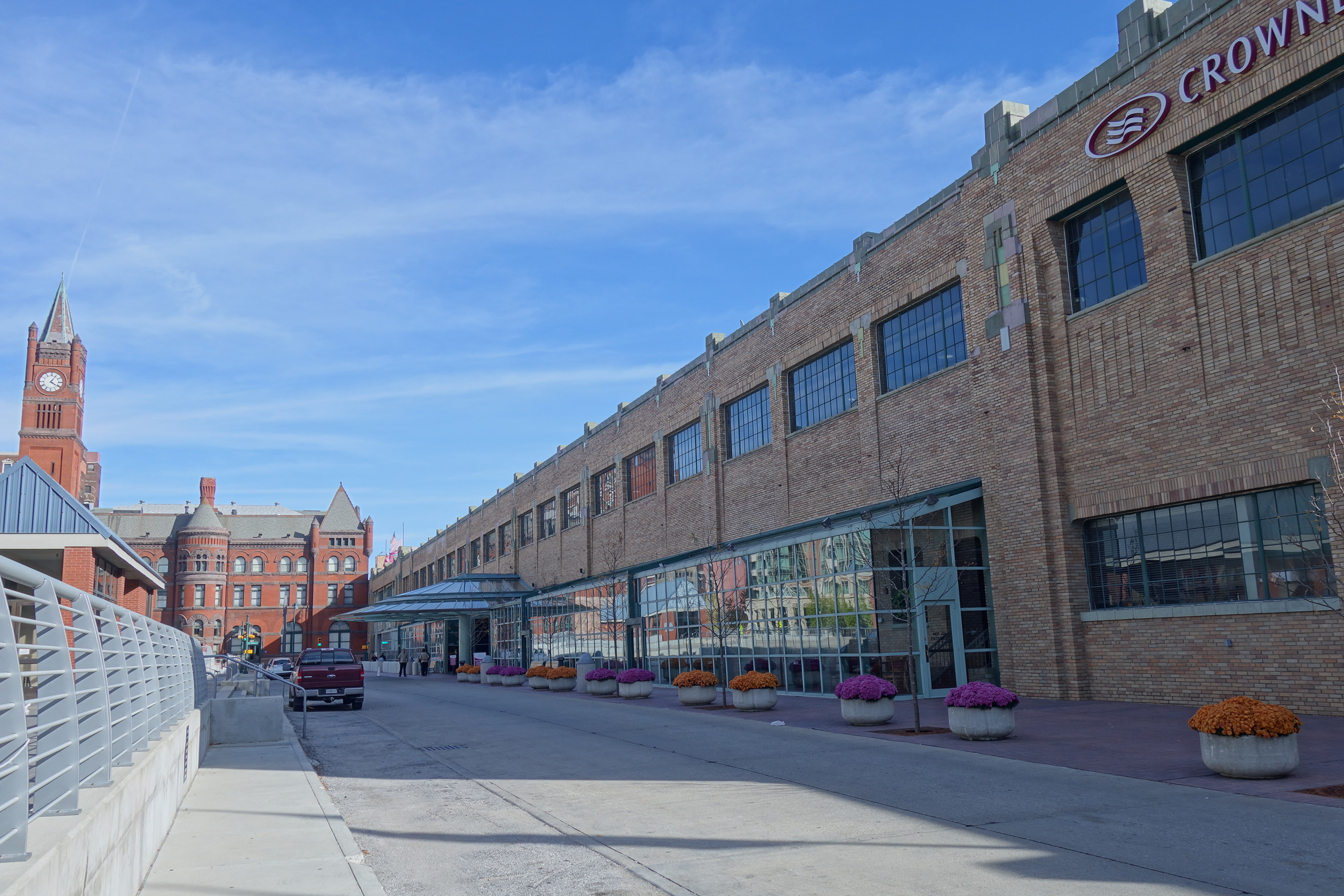
Union Station (background) and Crowne Plaza Hotel (foreground) in 2015

In 2002, the 21st Century Charter School was started within the facility. The still-successful hotel expanded to take up a larger portion of the building. Additional companies and organizations began to inquire about and lease space in the station. In 2006, tenants included Bands of America, the Consulate of Mexico (which has since relocated elsewhere downtown), the Indiana Museum of African American History, the Japan-America Society of Indiana, and the Indiana Pacers academy (another charter school). Many of the building's internal directories still display Spanish as well as English, reflecting the demographic changes in Indianapolis, as well as being a left over from the days when the building housed the Mexican Consulate. The Grand Hall of Union Station is also rented out for banquets and other special events.

In January 2011, a new underground walkway between the newly expanded Indiana Convention Center (ICC) and nearby Lucas Oil Stadium opened. It also contains a connection to the Crowne Plaza hotel at the west end of Union Station. This climate-controlled pedestrian path replaces an above-ground link between the hotel and the now-demolished RCA Dome, which stood where the new wing of the convention center is now situated.

Passenger train service has been very limited in the Amtrak era. When Amtrak began operations in 1971, it ran three trains through Indianapolis–the South Wind, the James Whitcomb Riley, and the Spirit of St. Louis. However, most of these trains ran over deteriorating Penn Central trackage, and Amtrak eventually routed all of them away from Indianapolis except for the National Limited, successor of the Spirit of St. Louis.

Amtrak withdrew the National Limited in 1979, severing Indianapolis from the national rail network. It also isolated Amtrak's primary maintenance facility, the Beech Grove Shops in nearby Beech Grove. Rail service returned to Indianapolis in 1980, when the Hoosier State began running daily to Chicago. Northbound trains would leave in the morning, while southbound trains would arrive in the evening. It was joined in 1986 by the New York-to-Chicago Cardinal, successor of the James Whitcomb Riley. For most of the time from 1986 until Indiana withdrew its support for the train in June 2019, the Hoosier State ran on the four days that the Cardinal did not operate, thereby providing daily service along the route.

From 1999 to 2003, the station was served by the Kentucky Cardinal, an extension of the Hoosier State that ran to Louisville, operating as a section of the Cardinal on the days that the Cardinal ran. The southbound train split from the eastbound Cardinal at Union Station, while the northbound train joined the westbound Cardinal for the journey to Chicago. With the discontinuation of the Hoosier State, Indianapolis is served by only one train for only the second time in its history.

The station is served by two Amtrak Thruway lines–one serving western and central Illinois (the Quad Cities, Peoria, Bloomington-Normal, Champaign-Urbana, and Danville) and another that stops at Nashville, Louisville, and Cincinnati en route to Chicago.

Since 1979, Amtrak passengers use a waiting area in the southern portion of Union Station's old train shed, at street level along Illinois Street. The Amtrak station is co-located with the city's Greyhound bus depot, making this a multi-modal transportation hub, albeit a small one. There is no commuter or light rail service in Indianapolis. The Greyhound ticket office is located along a wall opposite the Amtrak ticket office.

In FY 2013, Indianapolis averaged about 99 passengers daily, among the fewest for a station serving a metropolitan area of more than two million people. It is the busiest stop in Indiana served by Amtrak.

The 1888 station building is mostly leased for offices to pay for the building upkeep. The city struggled with finding a use for the building that is financially viable and high-profile. The Crowne Plaza Hotel still operates in the train shed structure, and leases out the main concourse, the Grand Hall, for weddings and other events.

== Gallery ==
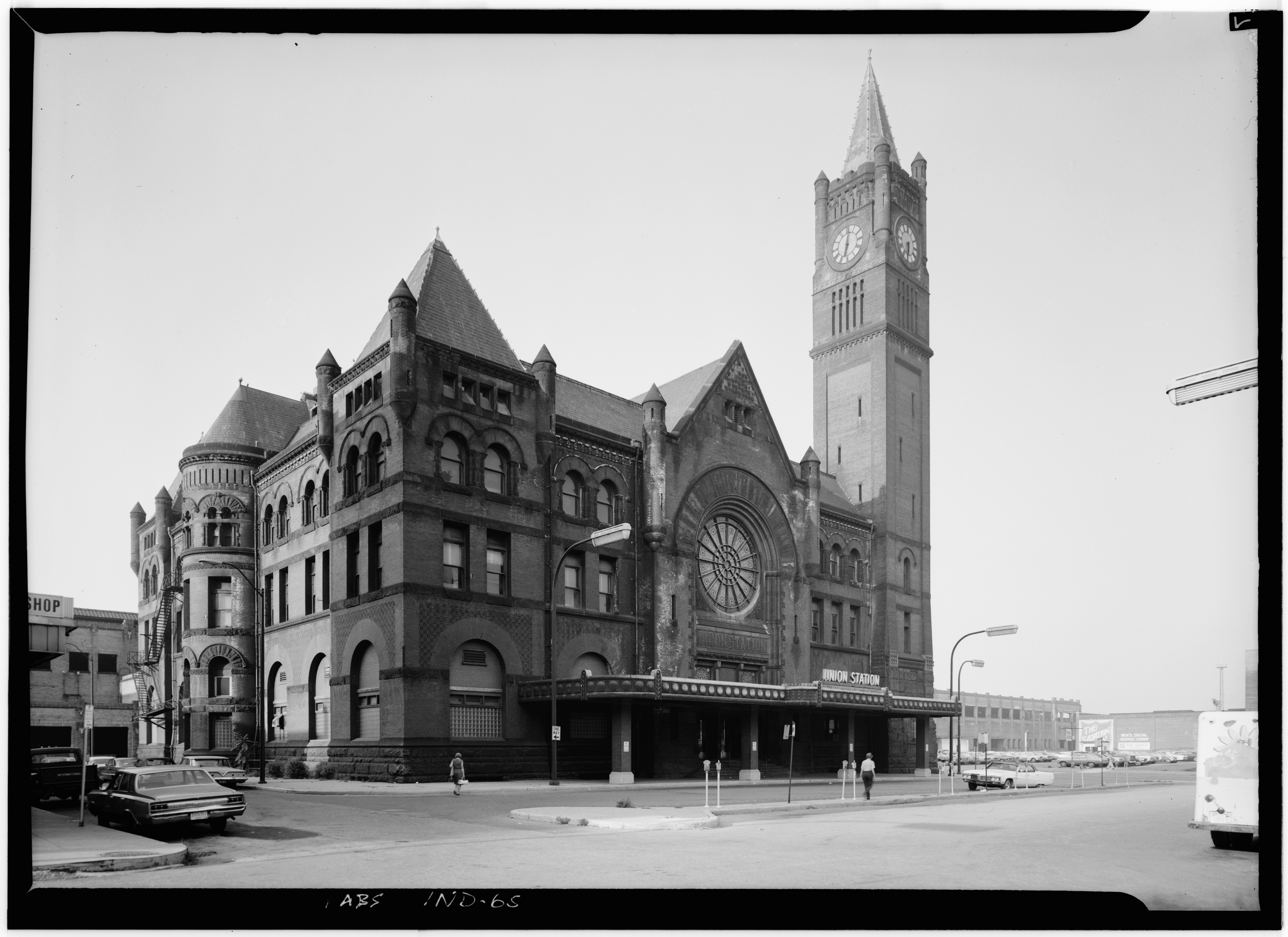
North front, 1970

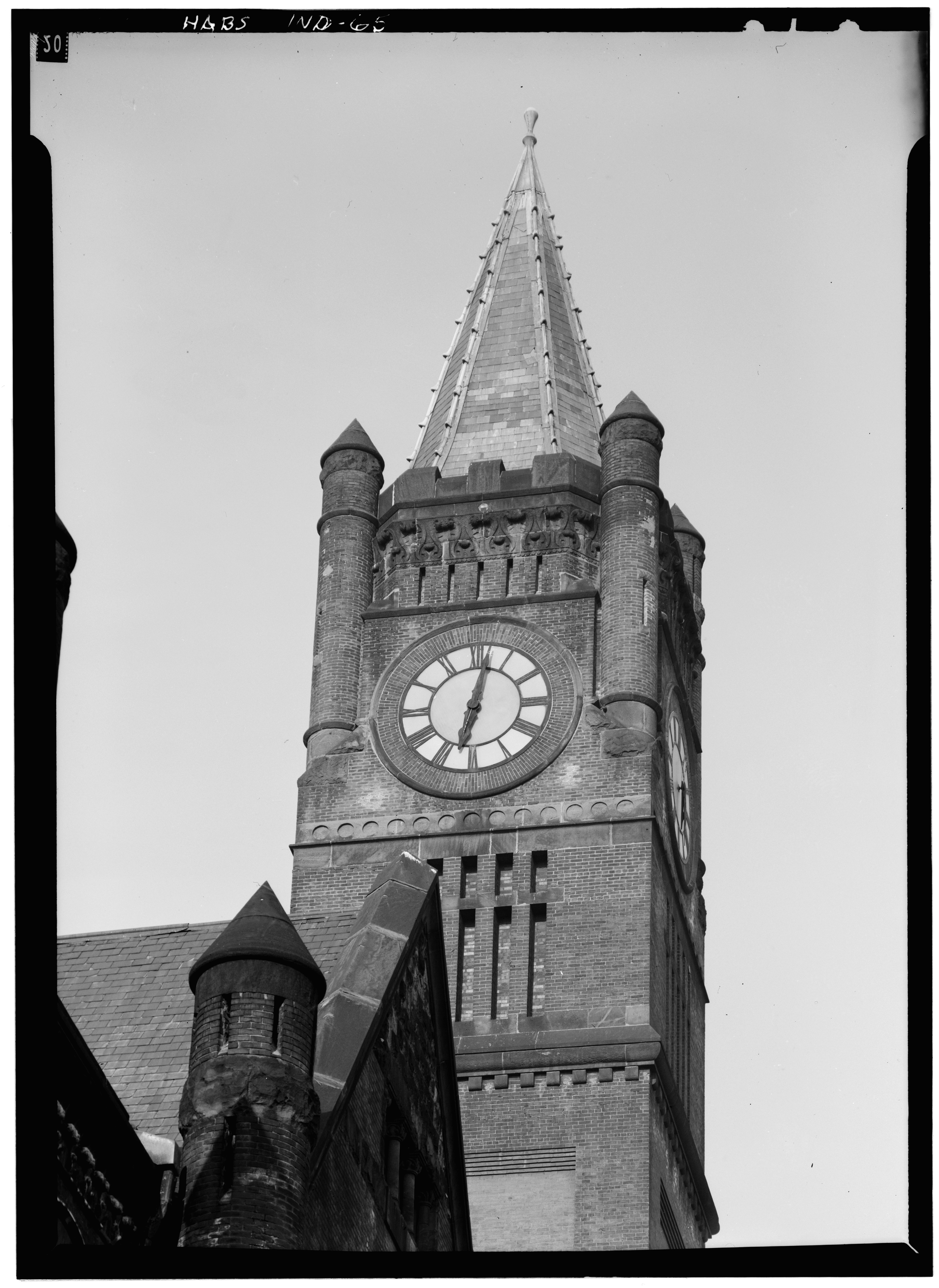
Tower detail, 1970

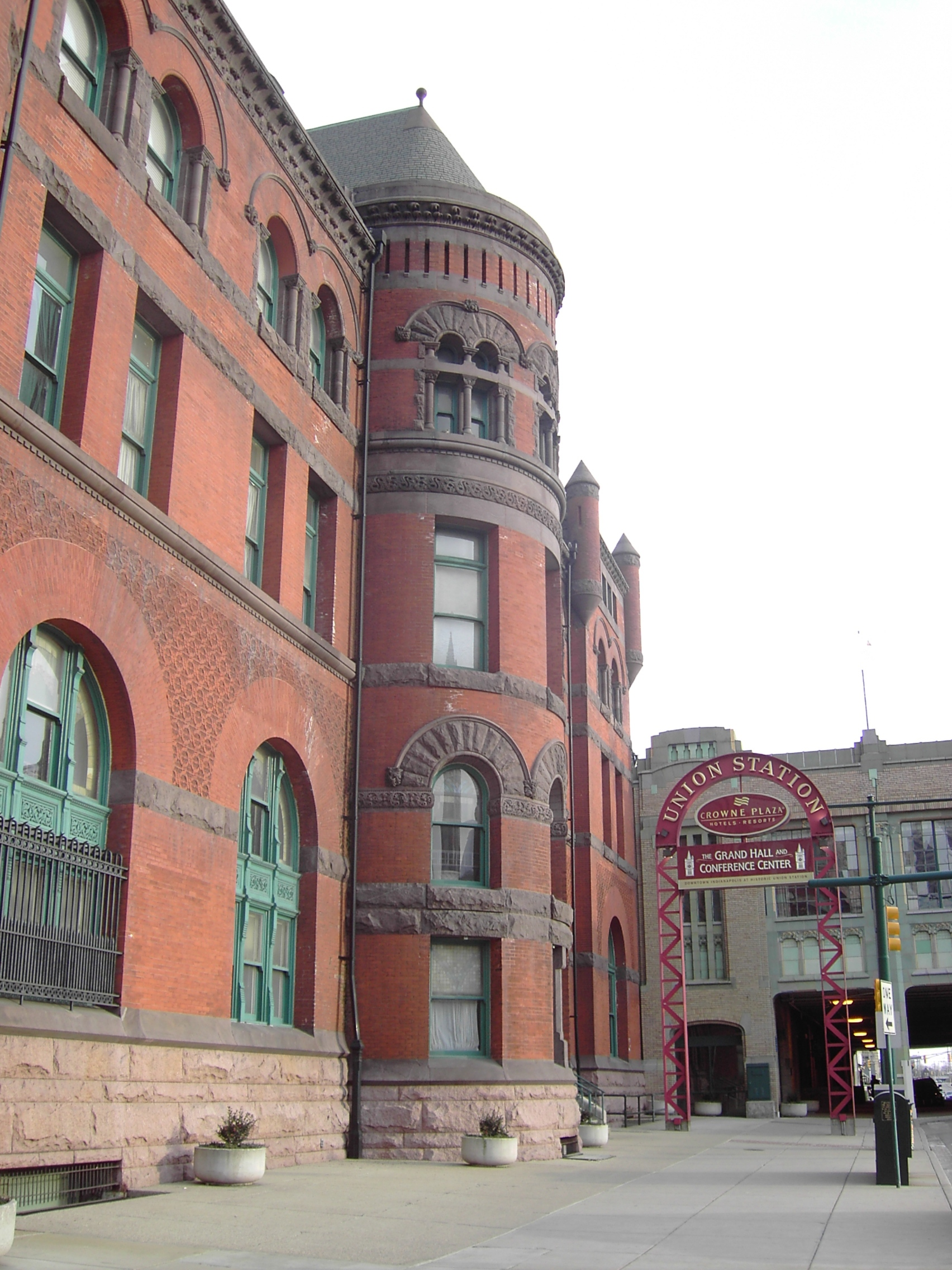
South Illinois Street entrance

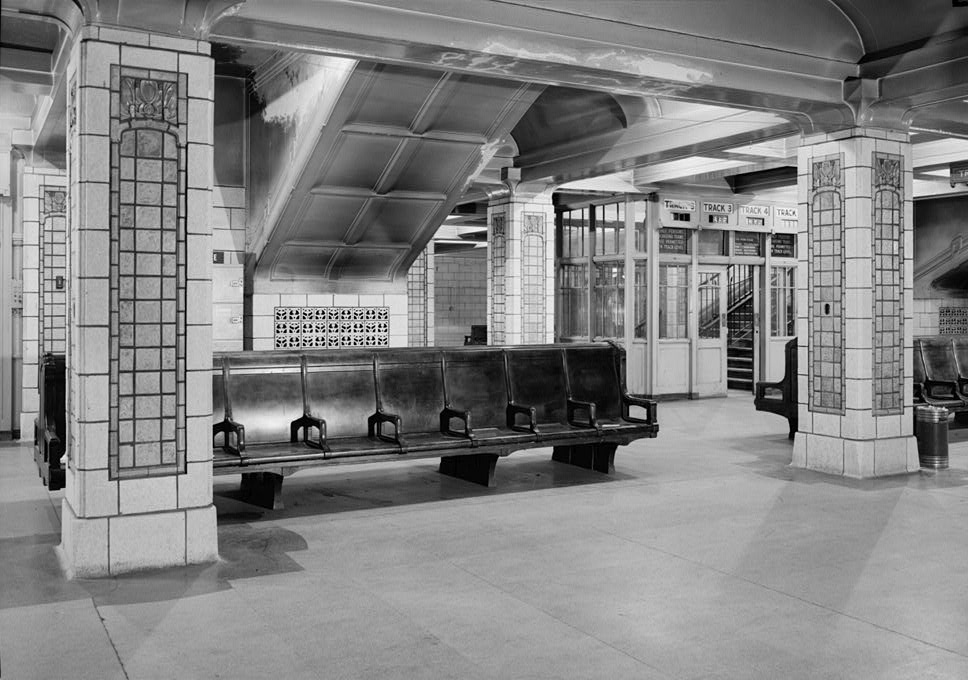
Train gates, 1970

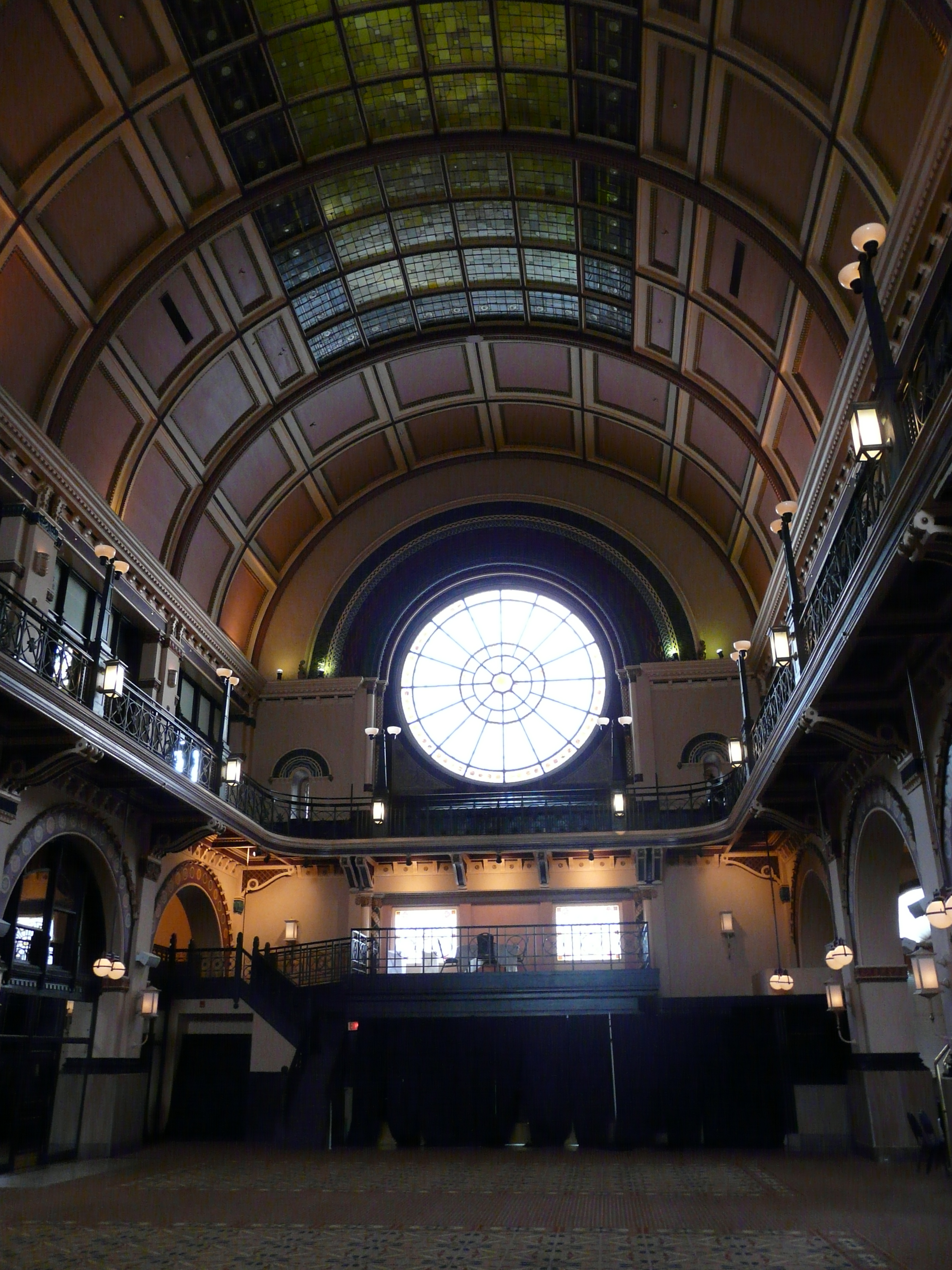
Main hall

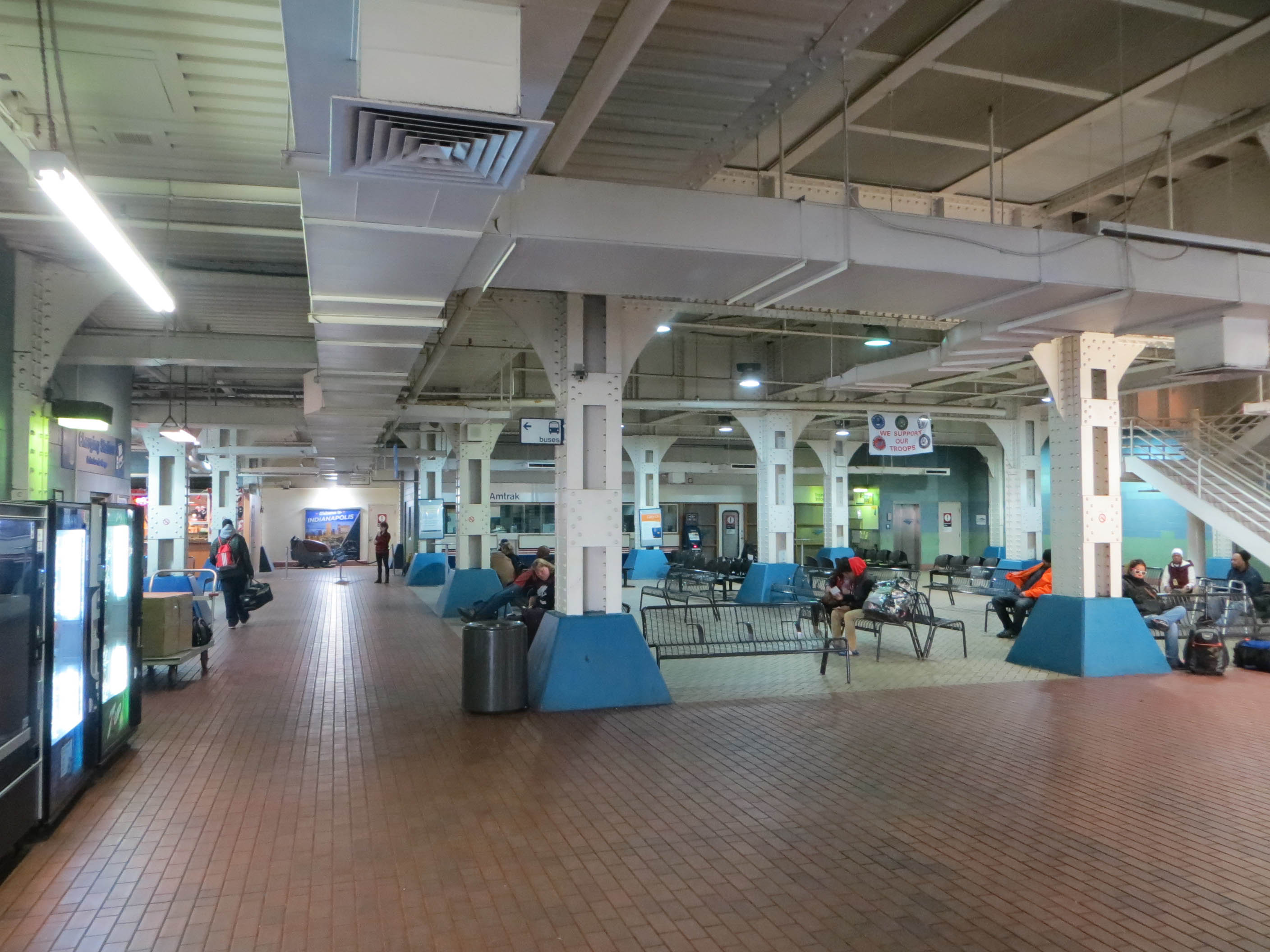
Waiting room

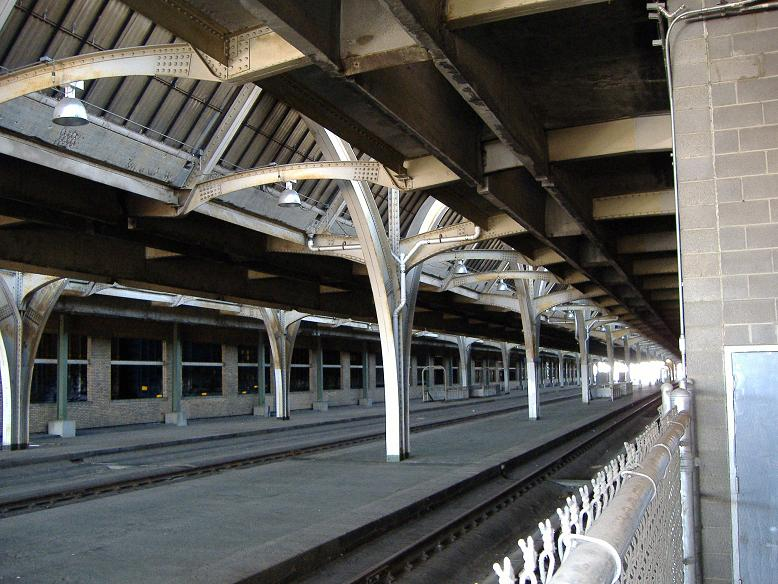
Platforms

== See also ==
- Transportation in Indianapolis
- Indianapolis Historic Preservation Commission
- List of attractions and events in Indianapolis
- List of Amtrak stations
- List of Greyhound Bus stations
- List of tallest clock towers
- National Register of Historic Places listings in Center Township, Marion County, Indiana
