= New Albany station =

- New Albany and Salem Railroad Station
- Formerly listed on the U.S. National Register of Historic Places
- Location within Indiana Location within the United States
- Location: Pearl and Oak Sts., New Albany, Indiana
- Area: 1.3 acres (0.53 ha)
- Built: c. 1851
- Architectural style: Howe truss type
- NRHP reference No.: 84001031

Significant dates
- Added to NRHP: January 12, 1984
- Removed from NRHP: March 25, 1996

New Albany and Salem Railroad Station, also known as Monon Station, was a historic train station located at New Albany, Indiana. The head-house was built about 1851, and was a two-story rectangular brick head-house. It had one-story wings and a long train shed at the rear added in the late 19th century.

The station was listed on the National Register of Historic Places in 1984. The building caught fire in March 1995, weakening the structure. It was torn down later that year. It was subsequently delisted from the National Register in 1996.

Preceding station	Monon Railroad	Following station
Smiths toward Chicago	Main Line	Louisville Terminus
