= Floridian (train, 1971–1979) =

Former Amtrak train between Chicago and Florida

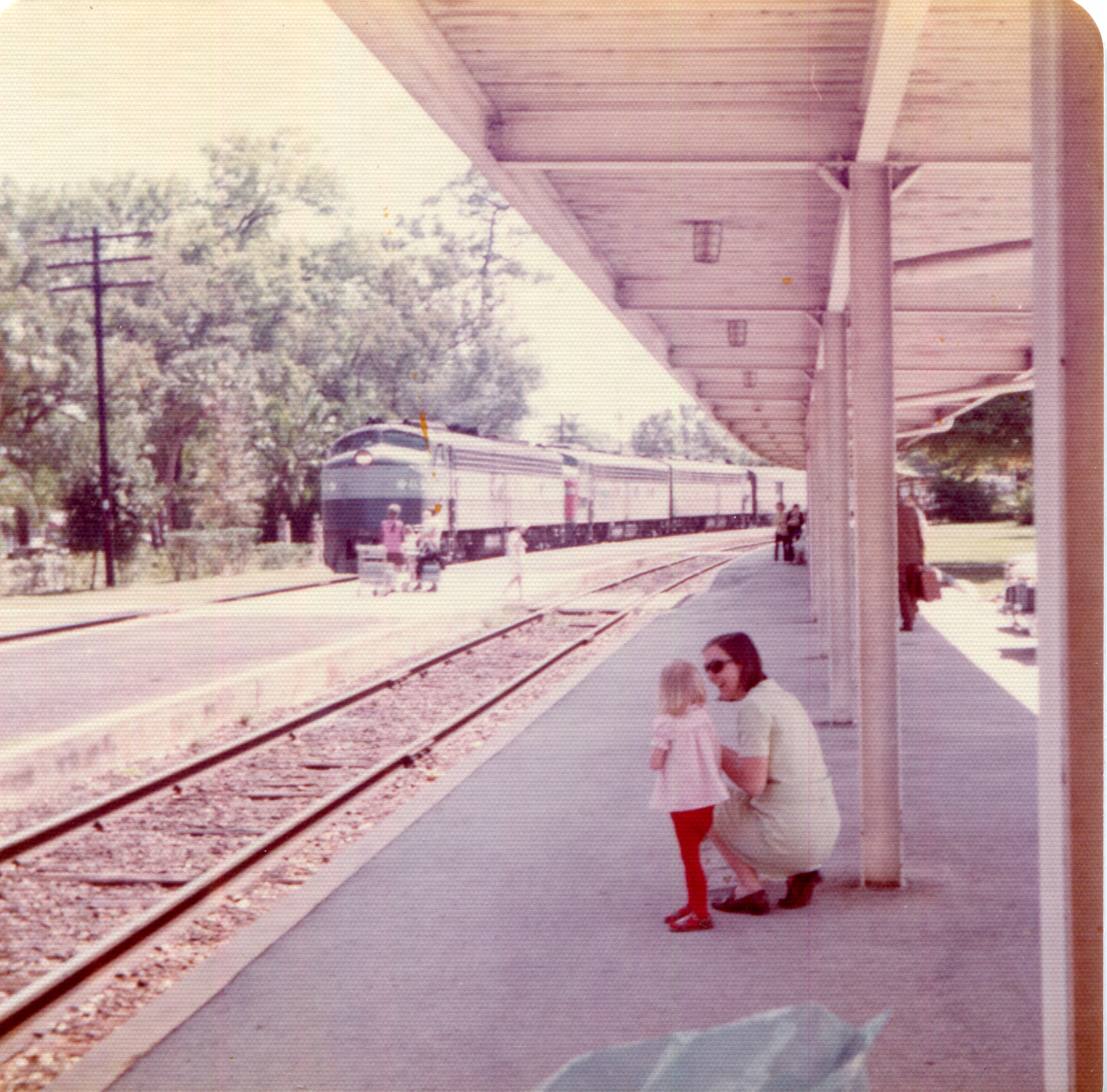
- The Floridian at Winter Park in 1973

Overview
- Service type: Inter-city rail
- Status: Discontinued
- Locale: Eastern United States
- Predecessor: South Wind
- First service: November 14, 1971
- Last service: October 9, 1979
- Former operator: Amtrak

Route
- Termini: Chicago, Illinois; St. Petersburg, Florida; Miami, Florida
- Stops: 32
- Distance travelled: 1,597 miles (2,570 km) (Miami); 1,481 miles (2,383 km) (St. Petersburg)
- Average journey time: 38 hours 40 minutes (Miami); 38 hours 33 minutes (St. Petersburg)
- Service frequency: Daily
- Train number: 56, 57

On-board services
- Classes: Sleeping cars and reserved coach
- Catering facilities: Dining car and café-lounge car
- Observation facilities: Dome cars
- Baggage facilities: Baggage car

Technical
- Track gauge: 4 ft 8 1/2 in (1,435 mm)
- Track owners: Louisville and Nashville Railroad; Seaboard Coast Line Railroad

The Floridian was a train operated by Amtrak from 1971 to 1979 that ran between Chicago and Florida, with two branches south of Jacksonville terminating at Miami and St. Petersburg. For its Nashville to Montgomery segment, its route followed that of several former Louisville & Nashville Railroad (L&N) passenger trains, including the Pan-American and the Humming Bird (Cincinnati–Louisville–New Orleans). Originating in Chicago, the train served Lafayette and Bloomington, Indiana; Louisville and Bowling Green, Kentucky; Nashville, Tennessee; Decatur, Birmingham, Montgomery and Dothan, Alabama; and Thomasville, Valdosta and Waycross, Georgia.

The Floridian was notorious for lackluster on-time performance, owing to poor track conditions and the poor condition of the equipment it inherited from railroads previously operating on the route. The train used the lines of L&N (including the former Monon Railroad in Indiana, which merged into the L&N shortly after the formation of Amtrak), and Seaboard Coast Line. All are now part of CSX Transportation; some parts of the former route have since been abandoned by CSX.

Amtrak discontinued the Floridian in October 1979, leaving Louisville and Nashville without passenger train service, two of the largest such cities in the nation to have this distinction. (Louisville briefly regained Amtrak service with the Kentucky Cardinal, which operated 1999–2003.) The train was also the very last of a number of long-distance trains that ran between Chicago and Miami for much of the 20th century. Previous trains, on different route configurations between those endpoints, passing through different cities on their respective routes, included City of Miami, Dixie Flagler and South Wind.

A new Chicago–Miami train, also called Floridian, began service in November 2024 on a different routing as a temporary merger of the Capitol Limited and Silver Star.

== History ==
=== Pre-Amtrak ===
The Floridian as conceived by Amtrak was a successor of the Pennsylvania Railroad's (PRR) South Wind, which operated over PRR track from Chicago to Louisville via Logansport and Indianapolis, Indiana; then L&N from Louisville to Montgomery, Alabama; the Atlantic Coast Line (ACL) from Montgomery via Waycross to Jacksonville; and then either the Florida East Coast Railway (FEC) to Miami or the Atlantic Coast Line to St. Petersburg.

=== Amtrak ===
Amtrak retained the South Wind as a through daily Chicago–Miami train. However, the train was rerouted away from Logansport to the James Whitcomb Riley route via Indianapolis, changing its northern terminus to Chicago's Central Station (owned by Illinois Central Railroad [IC]), which it shared with the Panama Limited) until that facility was vacated later in favor of consolidating all Amtrak services at Chicago's Union Station. The Floridian began using Union Station on January 23, 1972. A passenger stop was re-established at Logansport on October 29th, after a few months of use as an unofficial stop during crew changes.

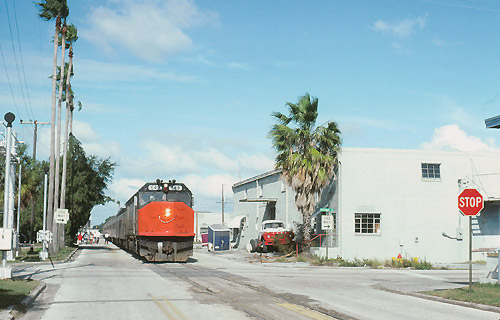
The southbound St. Petersburg section of the Floridian at Clearwater in 1979

Amtrak also began serving the west coast of Florida by splitting the now-daily South Wind into St. Petersburg and Miami sections. The train split at Auburndale, with one section continuing to Miami and another going to St. Petersburg via Tampa. On November 14, the South Wind was reconfigured as the Floridian. The St. Petersburg and Miami sections were retained, but the split now occurred in Orlando, with the St. Petersburg section serving Tampa and the Miami section serving Winter Haven. The split was moved further north to Jacksonville by the implementation of the April 1973 timetable.

On paper, the new Floridian should have been a success. It ran through several major Midwestern and Southern cities (Chicago, Louisville, Nashville, Birmingham) en route to Florida, and its predecessor had existed for over three decades. As well as Chicago–Florida passengers, the Floridian carried significant intra-Florida traffic as well as short-distance passengers on the L&N portion.

However, it was fraught with problems. It had to contend with deteriorating Penn Central (PC) track in Illinois, Indiana and Kentucky, which resulted in occasional use of MoPac (former Chicago & Eastern Illinois) and L&N (former Chicago, Indianapolis & Louisville: Monon) routes north of Louisville. In January 1977, the Floridian was cancelled for two weeks due to severe winter weather in Chicago. Two other long-distance Penn Central trains retained by Amtrak, the National Limited (successor to another PRR mainstay, the Spirit of St. Louis) and the James Whitcomb Riley, were plagued by similar problems.

During Amtrak's tenure, it continued to utilize E-units from many railroads before replacing them with then-new EMD SDP40F locomotives which began arriving in the mid-1970s. Unfortunately, these engines had a tendency to derail, especially on rickety PC trackage. The train suffered terrible delays and frequent derailments, including one at 10 miles per hour (16 km/h). The consists remained steam-heated, and never received Head-End Power (HEP) equipment.

The Floridian was briefly combined with the Auto-Train Corporation's Louisville, Kentucky–Sanford, Florida Auto-Train service in the mid-1970s. The success with the original Lorton, Virginia–Sanford Auto-Train did not replicate itself on the Louisville–Sanford run, in part due to the severe delays on the Floridian, and the Louisville–Sanford Auto-Train was suspended indefinitely a few years before Auto-Train Corporation itself finally succumbed to financial difficulties in April 1981. As part of this move Amtrak stopped serving Union Station in Louisville on November 1, 1976, instead using Auto-Train Corp's station near Louisville International Airport. This continued until the Floridian's discontinuance.

In 1979, the United States Department of Transportation compiled a report that recommended the reduction of services on several routes that did not meet a metric for cost coverage. Per this report, the Carter administration required all Amtrak routes to meet a minimum cost/farebox ratio or face discontinuance. Unfortunately, the aforementioned track issues and delays resulted in a steep decline in ridership for the Floridian. It made its last run on October 9, 1979, and was shuttered along with the National Limited, North Coast Hiawatha, Lone Star, and Champion, thus rolling back some of the key parts of the Amtrak system and also alleviating some of the losses it had incurred since its May 1, 1971, founding.

=== Proposed restoration ===
There has been no concrete effort to re-establish direct Chicago–Miami service, either on the route of the South Wind/Floridian or on that of its partners the City of Miami and Dixie Flagler. During the early 2000s, Amtrak extended the Kentucky Cardinal to a re-opened Louisville Union Station, then discontinued the train again.

In the 2000s, Nashville residents proposed restoring train service to the city. However, in 2007 Tennessee state officials said resumption of service was unlikely, since federal funds were unavailable. Officials also stated that there was insufficient demand to justify restoring rail service at the time.

In June 2021, Senator Jon Tester (D-Montana) added an amendment to the Surface Transportation Investment Act of 2021 which requires the Department of Transportation (not Amtrak itself) to evaluate the restoration of discontinued long-distance routes, such as the Floridian. The bill passed the Senate Commerce Committee with bipartisan support, and was later rolled into President Biden's Infrastructure Investment and Jobs Act (IIJA), which was passed into law in November 2021. The report must be delivered to Congress within two years. The law also provides $2.4 billion in new funds to Amtrak's long-distance route network.

On October 28, 2022, the FRA announced the beginning of the Amtrak Daily Long-Distance Service Study as required by the IIJA. Its purpose is to evaluate the restoration and addition of discontinued and new long-distance passenger services, as well as the upgrading of tri-weekly long-distance services (the Sunset Limited and the Cardinal) to daily operation. The criteria for either restoring or creating new long-distance routes are that they connect large and small communities as part of a "regional rail network", provide economic and social well-being for rural areas, provide "enhanced connectivity" for the existing long-distance passenger trains, and reflect the support and engagement of the locals and region for restored long-distance passenger service. These criteria include the Floridian, among other trains. The study will take place through 2023, and will engage with stakeholders, the rail companies, and communities as it "evaluates how to better connect people with long-distance rail services".

A new Chicago–Miami train, also called Floridian, began service in November 2024. It is a temporary merger of the Capitol Limited and Silver Star and operates via Cleveland, Pittsburgh, and Washington D.C. rather than the previous Floridian routing.
