= Union Station (Louisville, Kentucky) =

Railroad station in Louisville, Kentucky

Louisville, KY
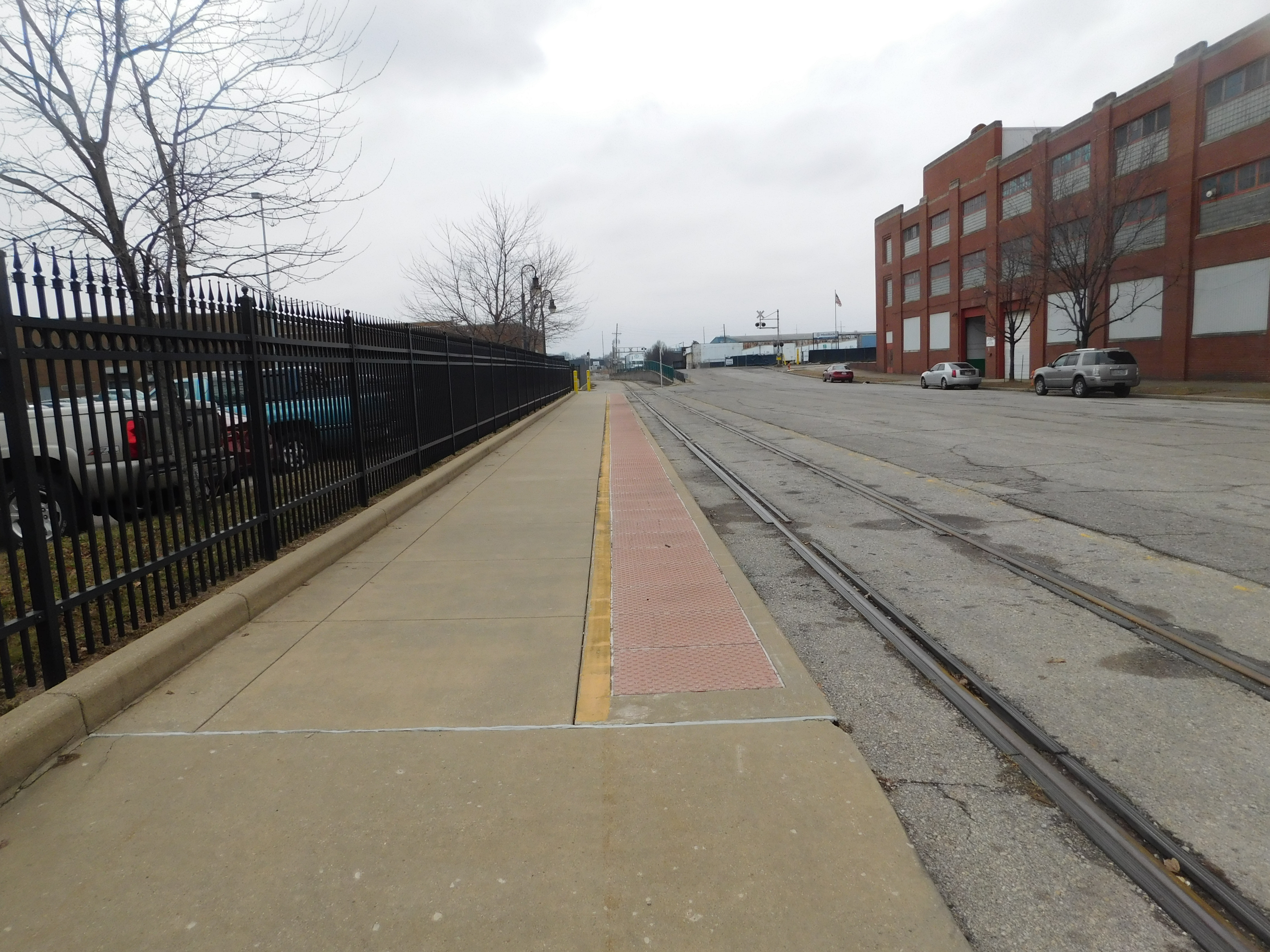
- The former platform for the Kentucky Cardinal at Louisville Union Station.

General information
- Location: 1000 West Broadway, Louisville, Kentucky; USA
- Coordinates: 38°14′46″N 85°46′8″W
- System: inter-city rail station
- Tracks: 1

Construction
- Architect: F.W. Mowbray, Col Henry C. Wolters
- Architectural style: Romanesque

History
- Opened: 1891
- Closed: 1979 (first time); July 5, 2003 (second time)

Former services
Preceding station	Amtrak	Following station
Bowling Green toward St. Petersburg or Miami	Floridian	Indianapolis 1971–1975 toward Chicago
Bowling Green toward St. Petersburg or Miami	Floridian	Bloomington 1975–1976 toward Chicago
Jeffersonville toward Chicago	Kentucky Cardinal	Terminus
Preceding station	Pennsylvania Railroad	Following station
Jeffersonville toward Chicago	Chicago – Louisville	Terminus
Preceding station	Louisville and Nashville Railroad	Following station
Shepherdsville toward New Orleans	Main Line	St. Matthews toward Cincinnati
Kenwood Hill toward St. Louis	St. Louis – Louisville	Terminus
Preceding station	Monon Railroad	Following station
New Albany toward Chicago	Main Line	Terminus
Former services at Auto-Train station
Preceding station	auto-train	Following station
Terminus	Sanford–Louisville 1974–1977	Sanford Terminus
Preceding station	Amtrak	Following station
Bloomington toward Chicago	Floridian 1976–1979	Bowling Green toward St. Petersburg or Miami
- Union Station
- U.S. National Register of Historic Places
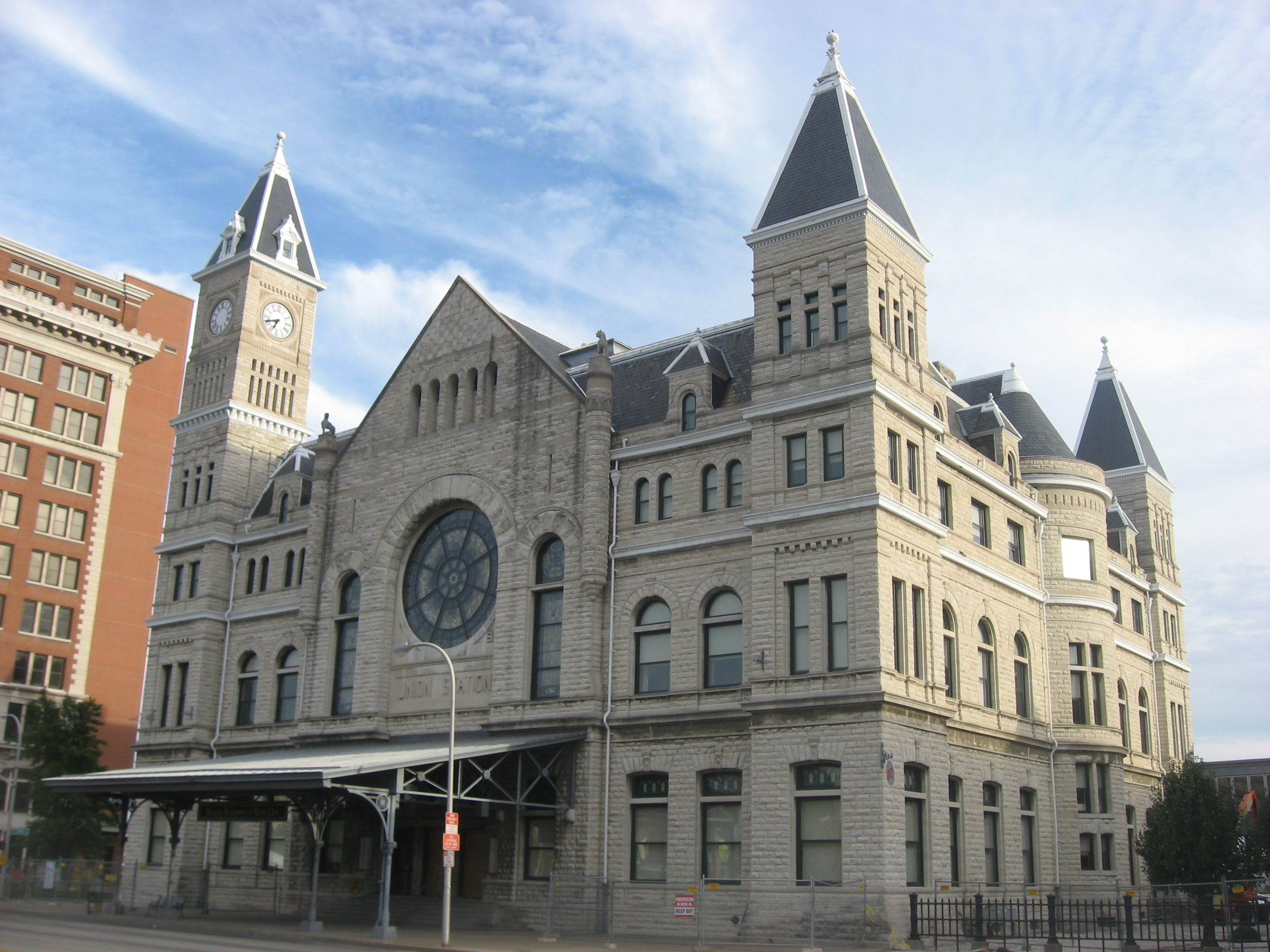
- Front and western side at sunset
- NRHP reference No.: 75000777
- Added to NRHP: August 11, 1975
Location
- Location within Kentucky

The Union Station of Louisville, Kentucky is a historic railroad station that serves as offices for the Transit Authority of River City (TARC), as it has since mid-April 1980 after receiving a year-long restoration costing approximately $2 million. It was one of at least five union stations in Kentucky, amongst others located in Lexington, Covington, Paducah and Owensboro. It was one of three stations serving Louisville, the others being Central Station and Southern Railway Station. It superseded previous, smaller, railroad depots located in Louisville, most notably one located at Tenth and Maple in 1868–1869, and another L&N station built in 1858. The station was formally opened on September 7, 1891, by the Louisville and Nashville Railroad. There was a claim made at the time that it was the largest railroad station in the Southern United States, covering forty acres (16 hectares). The other major station in Louisville was Central Station, serving the Baltimore and Ohio, the Illinois Central and other railroads.

== Construction ==
Construction of the station began in 1880, but completion was delayed until 1889–91 due to rising costs totaling at $310,656.47. Local contractors constructed all but the clock tower. Architect Col Henry C. Wolters is credited with the design and supervision of the original structure. Architect F. W. Mowbray was specifically hired for the project, which was to reflect the Richardsonian Romanesque style of architecture. Its exterior was made of limestone ashlar, mostly from Bowling Green, Kentucky, although that from Bedford, Indiana was used for its trim. The roof was made of a slate covering protecting iron and heavy wood. Architectural features include a clock tower, smaller towers, turrets, a facade of considerable size, and barreled vaulting. This station was a street-running station.

The interior was no less impressive. The atrium, dining, and ladies' retiring rooms on the first floor were quite spacious. A wrought iron balcony overlooked the atrium. Soft lighting of the facility came from rose-colored windows on both sides of the atrium. The walls were made of marble from Georgia, as well as oak and southern pine. Ceramic tiles covered the floor.

== History ==
Union Station provided the entrance to Louisville for many visitors, with its height being the 1920s, when it served 58 trains a day. As a Union Station, it served not only the L&N railroad, but also the Monon Railroad, the Pennsylvania Railroad and the Louisville, Henderson, & St. Louis, the latter eventually merging with the L&N. Many of those traveling to the Kentucky Derby would use the Union Station as their first place of celebration, with twenty special trains coming to the facility, and Pullman cars allowing overnight accommodations, a trend that continued until the mid-1960s.

Three separate United States presidents arrived in Louisville by Union Station. The lobby was once graced by a performance by Sarah Bernhardt.

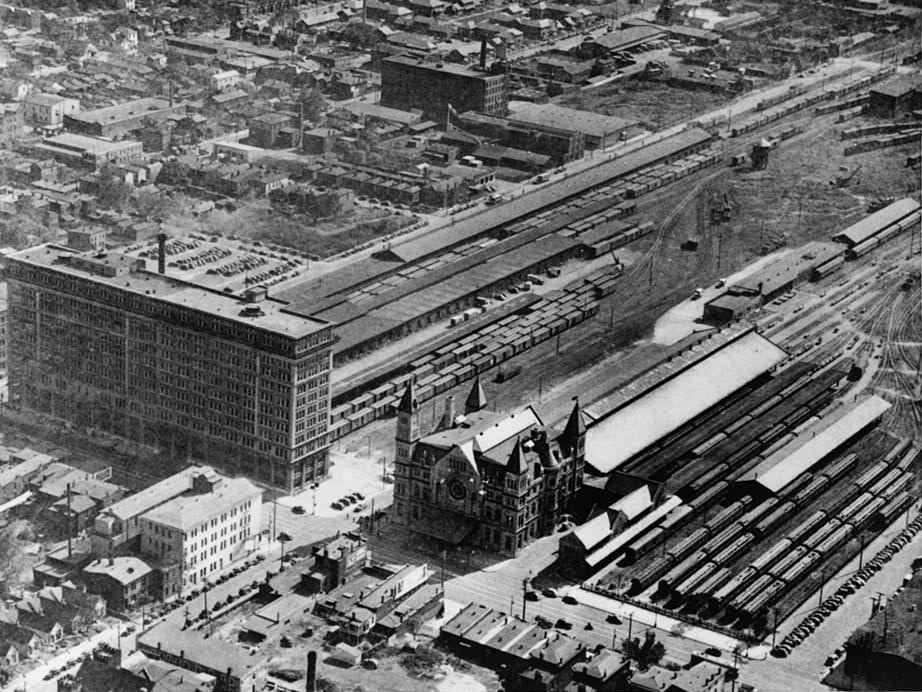
Aerial view of the Louisville passenger and freight terminals showing Union Station in the first half of the 20th century.

On July 17, 1905, a fire occurred in the facility. The structure was unusable until it reopened the following December. A temporary structure was used in its place during the restoration. The rose-colored windows were replaced due to the fire with an 84-paneled stained glass skylight that became a feature of the barrel-vaulting tower. The Ohio River flood of 1937 also saw the structure close for twelve days.

Amtrak used the facility regularly from May 1971 until October 1976, when it began running the Floridian in conjunction with the Auto-Train from a suburban station near Louisville International Airport. This arrangement would last until the discontinuation of the Floridian. From December 4, 2001, to July 4, 2003, a track on the west side of the parking lot served Amtrak's Kentucky Cardinal, which ran to Chicago via Indianapolis. However, this effort to return intercity rail to Louisville failed. This was primarily because the Indianapolis-Louisville leg ran along jointed rail that limited its speed to 30 miles per hour (48 km/h), slower than automobile traffic along Interstate 65.

L&N would eventually sell Union Station to TARC, which spent two million dollars from 1979 to 1980 to restore it. Since then it has served as administration offices for TARC.

In October 2010, TARC announced plans to use a grant from the U.S. Department of Transportation to restore all 278 windows at the 120-year-old Union Station, including 40 made of stained glass. Union Station will also get a new geothermal-energy system. Combined with the window restoration, TARC estimates its energy savings will be $58,000 per year.

=== Major named trains served at the station ===
Until the 1950s and 1960s the station served several prominent trains.

- Chicago, Indianapolis, and Louisville Railway (Monon Railroad):
  - Thoroughbred, – Chicago, Illinois – Louisville
- Louisville & Nashville:
  - Azalean, New York, New York – New Orleans, Louisiana, with western branch to Memphis, Tennessee
  - Flamingo, (for a period in the 1940s) – Cincinnati, Ohio – Jacksonville, Florida
  - Florida Arrow (winter train, pooled with the Pennsylvania Railroad and others), Chicago–Miami (and Sarasota and St. Petersburg)
  - Humming Bird, Cincinnati, Ohio – New Orleans
  - Pan-American, New York, New York – New Orleans
  - South Wind, Chicago – Miami, Florida
  - unnamed trains to St. Louis via Evansville
  - unnamed trains to Lexington, Kentucky via Frankfort, Kentucky
- Pennsylvania Railroad (PRR):
  - Kentuckian, Chicago – Louisville
  - Union, Chicago – Louisville branch (diverting from Chicago-Cincinnati branch at Logansport, Indiana)

Connecting PRR trains to Indianapolis for St. Louis, Missouri – New York City trains:

  - American, Metropolitan, Penn Texas and St. Louisan

Connecting PRR train to Fort Wayne for:

  - Northern Arrow (Mackinaw City, Michigan – Cincinnati)

== See also ==
- List of attractions and events in the Louisville metropolitan area
- Union Station (Owensboro, Kentucky)
