= Kentucky Cardinal =

Former Amtrak passenger train

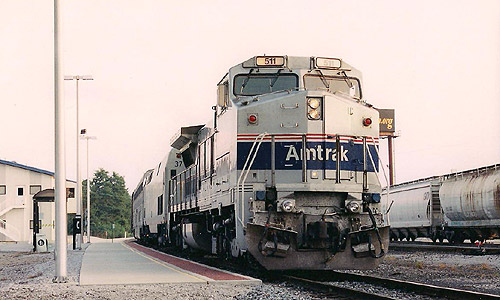
- The Kentucky Cardinal at Jeffersonville, Indiana in 2001

Overview
- Service type: Inter-city rail
- Locale: Midwestern United States
- Predecessor: Hoosier State
- First service: December 17, 1999
- Last service: July 5, 2003
- Successor: Hoosier State
- Former operator: Amtrak

Route
- Termini: Chicago; Louisville
- Stops: 6
- Distance travelled: 312 miles (502 km)
- Service frequency: Daily
- Train number: 850/851

Technical
- Track gauge: 4 ft 8 1/2 in (1,435 mm)
- Track owners: Louisville and Indiana Railroad; CSX Transportation; Cascade Investment Railway (as the privatization of CN); Union Pacific Railroad; Metra

The Kentucky Cardinal was a nightly 312-mile (502 km) passenger train operated by Amtrak from 1999 to 2003 between Chicago, Illinois, and Louisville, Kentucky, via Indianapolis, Indiana. On the three days that the Cardinal ran, the Kentucky Cardinal operated as a section, splitting at Indianapolis. On the other four days, it ran on its own to Chicago.

== History ==
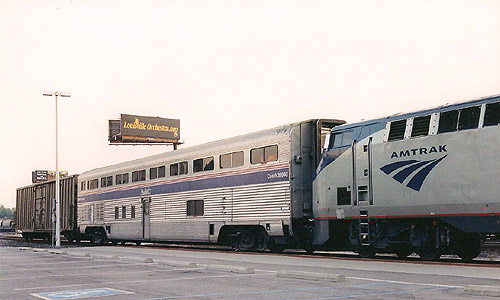
A typical Kentucky Cardinal consist: a Dash 8-32BWH locomotive (out of frame), a P42DC locomotive, a Hi-Level coach, and a boxcar

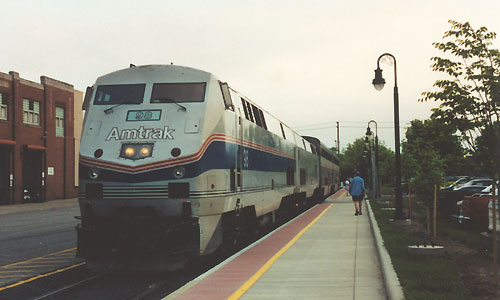
The Kentucky Cardinal at Louisville in May 2002

Between May 1971 and August 1974 Amtrak's Floridian ran from Chicago to Florida via Indianapolis and Louisville. Due to deteriorating Penn Central track in Indiana, the train was rerouted to the west north of Nashville, Tennessee. In April 1975 the train was routed back east over the former Monon Railroad, again serving Louisville, but bypassing Indianapolis to the west. The Floridian served Louisville until its discontinuance in October 1979.

On December 17, 1999, the Kentucky Cardinal started running as a rebranding and extension of the Hoosier State, which ran four days a week between Chicago and Indianapolis (filling in the gaps in the Cardinal schedule). The Kentucky Cardinal ran as trains 850 southbound and 851 northbound, the same numbers as the Hoosier State. The train ran along former Pennsylvania Railroad/Penn Central trackage that had been used by the Floridian. It was an attempt to attract express business from United Parcel Service, which maintains its air-express hub at Louisville International Airport. At first the train only ran from Indianapolis south to Jeffersonville, Indiana, a Louisville suburb, where a new Amtrak Mail and Express facility was built. The city of Louisville spent $370,000 in 2001 to renovate Louisville Union Station for the service, and on December 4 the Kentucky Cardinal started to use a new track on the west side of the Union Station parking lot, marking Amtrak's return to Louisville after a 20-year absence.

Unlike its predecessor, the Kentucky Cardinal was a full-fledged daily train. On the days the Cardinal operated, the southbound Kentucky Cardinal split from the eastbound Cardinal (train 50) at Indianapolis and continued to Louisville, while the northbound Kentucky Cardinal combined with the westbound Cardinal (train 51) in Indianapolis for the journey to Chicago. On the remaining four days of the week, the Kentucky Cardinal ran independently from Louisville to Chicago. The Texas Eagle operates in a similar manner, running as a section of the Sunset Limited on the three days that the latter train operates.

The train was handicapped by inconvenient departure and arrival times, as it ran on the same schedule as the Indianapolis-Chicago leg of the Cardinal. It was also plagued by slow travel times, especially on the segment from Indianapolis south to Louisville. This segment was operated over the Louisville and Indiana Railroad, which had purchased the line from Conrail in 1994, and had a speed limit of 30 miles per hour (48 km/h) over most of the route due to its jointed rail. This made travel on the southern leg of the Kentucky Cardinal slower than automobile traffic on the parallel Interstate 65.

With the opening in 1999, Greyhound began running Amtrak Thruway bus connections from Jeffersonville south to Nashville, Tennessee, with stops at Elizabethtown and Bowling Green, Kentucky. Though rail passenger advocates tried to get the train's route extended to Nashville in an effort to increase ridership, Amtrak lost its mail contract, and the Kentucky Cardinal last ran July 4, 2003, restoring the old Hoosier State on July 6 (the Cardinal ran both ways on July 5).

== Route details ==
The tracks used were originally part of the Pennsylvania Railroad system, and are now owned by the Louisville and Indiana Railroad. The following lines were used:

- Louisville Bridge and Terminal Railway (PRR), Louisville, Kentucky, to Clarksville, Indiana, now L&I
- Jeffersonville, Madison and Indianapolis Railroad (PRR), Clarksville to Indianapolis, Indiana, now L&I

== Bibliography ==
- Comer, Kevin (2012). Louisville & Nashville Railroad in South Central Kentucky. Images of Rail (1st ed.). Arcadia Publishing. ISBN 978-0738592145.
- Sanders, Craig (2006). Amtrak in the Heartland. Bloomington, Indiana: Indiana University Press. ISBN 978-0-253-34705-3.
