= Thoroughbred (train) =

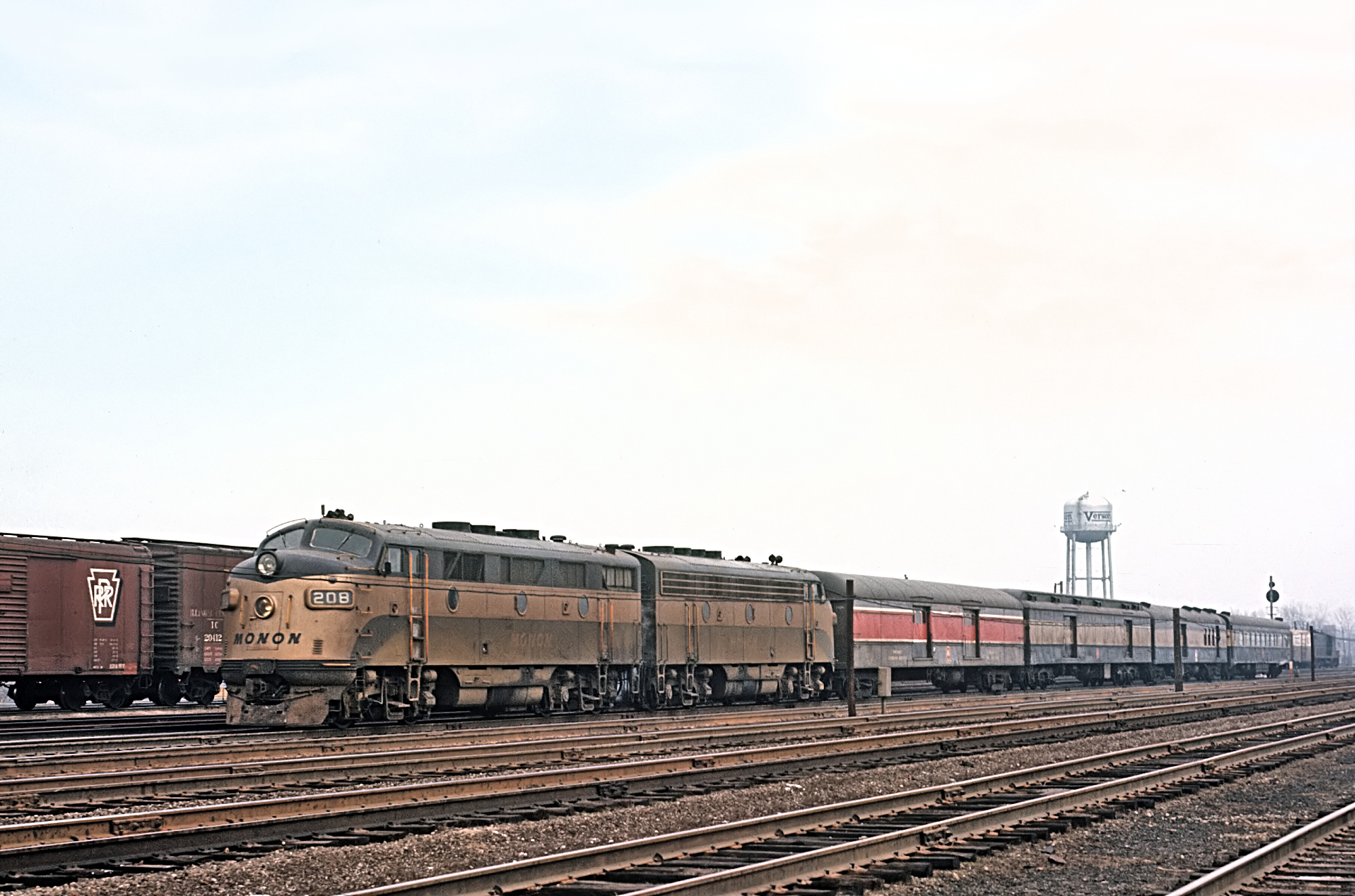
- Two EMD F3s lead the Thoroughbred through South Chicago in 1965

Overview
- Service type: Inter-city rail
- Status: Discontinued
- Locale: Midwestern United States
- Predecessor: Day Express
- First service: February 15, 1948
- Last service: September 30, 1967
- Former operator: Monon Railroad

Route
- Termini: Chicago, Illinois; Louisville, Kentucky
- Distance travelled: 324.1 miles (521.6 km)
- Service frequency: Daily
- Train number: 5 southbound / 6 northbound

The Thoroughbred was a streamlined passenger train operated by the Chicago, Indianapolis and Louisville Railway (Monon) between Chicago, Illinois and Louisville, Kentucky via Monon, Indiana. It operated from 1948 to 1967. The Thoroughbred was the last passenger train operated by the Monon. It was named for the Thoroughbred horse breeds, a nod to the horse racing heritage of Louisville.

== History ==
Following World War II new Monon president John W. Barriger III embarked on a program to renew the Monon's passenger service, long neglected. The centerpiece of this program was a group of 28 surplus hospital cars originally built by the American Car and Foundry Company (ACF) in 1944–1945 for the U.S. Army. The Monon rebuilt these cars in their shops, creating enough lightweight coaches, parlor-observation cars, dining cars and mail/baggage cars to create three new streamliners: the Chicago-Indianapolis Hoosier and Tippecanoe, and the Chicago-Louisville Thoroughbred.

The Thoroughbred made its first run on February 15, 1948, replacing the Day Express. Monon discontinued the Thoroughbred on September 30, 1967. It was the final passenger service on the Monon, although Amtrak's Hoosier State utilized part of Monon's route between Indianapolis and Chicago.

== Route ==
The route length was 324 miles (521 km); the train operated as #5 (southbound) and #6 (northbound) and used Dearborn Station in Chicago.
