= John F. Nash =

John F. Nash may refer to:

- John Francis Nash (1909–2004), American railroad executive
- John Forbes Nash Jr. (1928–2005), American mathematician and Nobel laureate
- John F. Nash (ship), U.S. Army tug built in 1943 which served in the Normandy landings, named for the Buffalo, New York engineer and official in the U.S. Army Corps of Engineers
