= Dakotan =

Dakotan may refer to:

- Sioux language, particularly the dialect of the Santee
  - Dakotan, a member of the Sioux, especially the Santee tribe
  - Dakotan, a branch of the Siouan languages including Sioux, Assiniboine and Stony
- SS Dakotan, a 1912 American-Hawaiian ship
- Dakotan (train), a named passenger train of the United States
- Dakotan, of or relating to the Dakota Territory in the United States

== See also ==
- North Dakota
- South Dakota
