= Easterner =

Easterner may refer to:

- a person from the Eastern world
- a person from the Eastern United States
- Easterner (MP train), a Missouri Pacific train; see List of named passenger trains of the United States (D–H) § E
- Easterner (NYC train), a New York Central train; see List of named passenger trains of the United States (D–H) § E
- Easterners (Korean political faction), a political faction in 16th-century Korea

== See also ==
- Bjǫrn the Easterner, a Viking
- Vardan Areveltsi, also known as "Vardan the Easterner"
- The Easterner (newspaper), the student newspaper of Eastern Washington University
