= List of named passenger trains of the United States (D–H) =

This article contains a list of named passenger trains in the United States, with names beginning D through H.

== D ==
| Train Name | Railroad | Train Endpoints in a typical [year] | Operated |
|---|---|---|---|
| Dakota 400 | Chicago & North Western | Chicago, Illinois - Rapid City, South Dakota [1952] | 1950–1960 |
| Dakota Express | Chicago & North Western | St. Paul, Minnesota - Pierre, South Dakota [1919] | 1897-1901; 1911–1913; 1919–1923 |
| Dakota Express | Great Northern | St. Paul, Minnesota - Grand Forks, North Dakota [1907] | 1903-1909 |
| Dakota Express | Minneapolis, St. Paul and Sault Ste. Marie Railroad | St. Paul, Minnesota - Bismarck, North Dakota [1915] | 1911-1918 |
| Dakotan | Great Northern | Williston, North Dakota - St. Paul, Minnesota [1950] | 1947-1971 |
| Dallas Express | Katy Railroad | Dallas, Texas - Shreveport, Louisiana [1910] | 1903-1920 |
| Dan'l Webster | New Haven | New York, New York - Boston, Massachusetts | 1957-? |
| Dartmouth | New Haven, Boston & Maine, Central Vermont | New York, New York - White River Junction, Vermont - Berlin, New Hampshire [1937] | 1928-1944; 1956 |
| Davy Crockett | San Antonio and Aransas Pass Railway | San Antonio, Texas - Houston, Texas [1912] | 1903-1915 |
| Day Cape Codder | New Haven | New York, New York - Woods Hole, Massachusetts [1937] | 1937-1944; 1946–1958; 1960–1964 |
| Day Coach De Luxe | New York Central | New York, New York - Buffalo, New York [1930] | 1929-1935 |
| Day Express | New York Central | New York, New York - Rochester, New York [1915] | 1890-1916 |
| Day Express | Pennsylvania | New York, New York - Pittsburgh, Pennsylvania [1924] | 1874-1942 |
| Day Express | Erie Railroad | New York, New York - Buffalo, New York [1913] | 1868-1870; 1874–1879; 1885–1915 |
| Day Express | New Haven | New York, New York - Boston, Massachusetts [1910] | 1881-1911 |
| Day Express | Chicago, Milwaukee, St. Paul and Pacific Railroad | Chicago, Illinois - Minneapolis, Minnesota [1917] | 1910-1938 |
| Day Express | Cleveland, Cincinnati, Chicago and St. Louis Railway | Indianapolis, Indiana - Peoria, Illinois [1932] | 1917-1941 |
| Day Express | Illinois Central, Nashville, Chattanooga and St. Louis Railway | St. Louis, Missouri - Nashville, Tennessee [1909] | 1900-1914 (the Illinois Central had many trains with this name and many destinations) |
| Day Express | Chicago, Rock Island and Pacific Railroad | Chicago, Illinois - Omaha, Nebraska [1915] | 1903-1904; 1913–1918 |
| Day Express | Chicago Great Western Railway | Saint Paul, Minnesota - Omaha, Nebraska [1905] | 1904-1910 |
| Day Express | Great Northern Railway | Minneapolis–Saint Paul - Duluth, Minnesota [1915] | 1910-1918 |
| Day White Mountains | New Haven and Boston & Maine | New York, New York - White River Junction, Vermont [1926] | 1926-1940; 1943-1956 (pre-1947 called the 'Day White Mountains Express') |
| Daylight Express | St. Louis–San Francisco Railway | Kansas City, Missouri - Memphis, Tennessee [1905] | 1902-1906 |
| Daylight Express | Florida East Coast Railway | Jacksonville, Florida - Miami, Florida [1948] | 1941-1959 |
| Daylight Flyer | Alton Railroad | St. Louis, Missouri - Kansas City, Missouri [1908] | 1908-1927 |
| Daylight Flyer | Chicago, Burlington and Quincy Railroad | Chicago, Illinois - Kansas City, Missouri [1915] | 1914-1918; 1923–1927 |
| Daylight Limited | Southern Pacific | San Francisco, California - Los Angeles, California [1925] | 1922-1939 (after 1928 called the 'Daylight') |
| Daylight Limited | Illinois Central | Chicago, Illinois - St. Louis, Missouri [1950] | 1897-1958 (pre-1931 called the 'Daylight Special') |
| Daylight Limited | Chicago, Indianapolis & Louisville | Chicago, Illinois - Cincinnati, Ohio [1914] | 1911-1918; 1924–1932 |
| Daylight Speedliner | Baltimore and Ohio Railroad | Philadelphia, Pennsylvania - Pittsburgh, Pennsylvania [1958] | 1957-1962 |
| Daylight Train | Baltimore and Ohio Railroad | Philadelphia, Pennsylvania - Cincinnati, Ohio [1907] | 1906-1916 |
| Dayton Express | Pennsylvania | Chicago, Illinois - Dayton, Ohio [1930] | 1928-1933 |
| Daytonian | Pennsylvania | Chicago, Illinois - Dayton, Ohio [1947] | 1946-1948 |
| De Luxe | Santa Fe | Chicago, Illinois - Los Angeles, California | 1911–1917 |
| Dearborn | Chicago and Eastern Illinois Railroad | Chicago, Illinois - St. Louis, Missouri [1928] | 1925-1933 |
| Del Monte | Southern Pacific | Monterey, California - San Francisco, California [1922] | 1919–1971 |
| Del-Mar-Va Express | Pennsylvania | New York, New York - Cape Charles, Virginia [1943] | 1926-1957 |
| Delaware Valley Express | Pennsylvania (and successor lines) | Philadelphia, Pennsylvania - Trenton, New Jersey [1965] | 1962-1978 |
| Delta Eagle | Missouri Pacific | Memphis, Tennessee - Tallulah, Louisiana [1948] | 1941–1954 |
| Delta Express | Illinois Central | Memphis, Tennessee - Greenville, Mississippi[1952] | 1927-1933; 1950–1964 |
| Denali Star | Alaska Railroad | Anchorage, Alaska - Fairbanks, Alaska | ?-present |
| Denver and Eastern Express | Denver and Rio Grande Railroad, Western Pacific Railroad | San Francisco, California - Denver, Colorado [1921] | 1918-1930 |
| Denver Express | Denver and Rio Grande Railroad | Denver, Colorado - Alamosa, Colorado [1913] | 1900-1901; 1912–1914 |
| Denver Express | Colorado Midland Railway | Denver, Colorado - Ogden, Utah [1913] | 1913-1918 |
| Denver Express | Wabash, Union Pacific Railroad | St. Louis, Missouri - Denver, Colorado - Cheyenne, Wyoming [1918] | 1916-1933 |
| Denver Express | Santa Fe | Denver, Colorado - La Junta, Colorado [1910] | 1906-1915 |
| Denver Limited | Union Pacific Railroad | Kansas City, Missouri - Cheyenne, Wyoming [1910] | 1910-1915 |
| Denver Limited | Union Pacific Railroad | Denver, Colorado - St. Louis, Missouri [1938] | 1935-1941 |
| Denver Limited | Chicago, Burlington & Quincy | Chicago, Illinois - Denver, Colorado [1910] | 1910-1917; 1929–1930 |
| Denver Special | Union Pacific Railroad, Chicago and Northwestern | Chicago, Illinois - Denver, Colorado [1916] | 1911-1917; 1921–1930 |
| Denver Zephyr | Chicago, Burlington & Quincy (1936–1971); Amtrak (1971–1973) | Chicago, Illinois - Denver, Colorado [1937] | 1936–1973 |
| Denver - Cripple Creek Express | Colorado Midland Railway | Denver, Colorado - Cripple Creek, Colorado [1913] | 1913-1916 |
| Des Moines Express | Chicago Great Western Railway | Chicago, Illinois - Des Moines, Iowa [1925] | 1923-1930 |
| Des Moines Limited | Wabash | St. Louis, Missouri - Des Moines, Iowa [1948] | 1940-1959 |
| Des Moines Rocket | Rock Island | Chicago, Illinois - Des Moines, Iowa [1952] | 1950-1967 |
| Des Moines - Chicago Rocket | Rock Island | Chicago, Illinois - Des Moines, Iowa [1945] | 1941-1949 |
| Des Moines - Omaha Limited | Rock Island | Chicago, Illinois - Omaha, Nebraska [1948] | 1948-1952 |
| Desert Wind | Amtrak | Los Angeles, California - Chicago, Illinois [1982] | 1979-1997 |
| Detroit and Kalamazoo Express | Michigan Central Railroad | Detroit, Michigan - Kalamazoo, Michigan [1916] | 1914-1928 |
| Detroit and New York Express | Grand Trunk Western, Lehigh Valley Railroad | New York, New York - Chicago, Illinois [1908] | 1902-1916 |
| Detroit Arrow | Pennsylvania and Wabash | Chicago, Illinois - Detroit, Michigan [1940] | 1935-1949 |
| Detroiter | New York Central | New York, New York - Detroit, Michigan | |
| Detroit Express | Duluth, South Shore & Atlantic | Mackinaw City, Michigan - Duluth, Minnesota [1916] | 1890-1892; 1901–1916 |
| Detroit Express | Grand Trunk Western | Chicago, Illinois - Detroit, Michigan [1916] | 1903-1916 |
| Detroit Express | Pennsylvania | Detroit, Michigan - Pittsburgh, Pennsylvania [1933] | 1929-1958 |
| Detroit Express | Wabash, Pennsylvania Railroad | Chicago, Illinois - Detroit, Michigan [1940] | 1939-1941 |
| Detroit Express | Detroit and Mackinac Railway | Detroit, Michigan - Alpena, Michigan [1921] | 1919-1935 |
| Detroit Express | New York Central | Detroit, Michigan - Pittsburgh, Pennsylvania [1930] | 1926-1931 |
| Detroit Limited | Wabash | St. Louis, Missouri - Detroit, Michigan [1940] | 1939-1968 |
| Detroit Mail and Express | Detroit and Mackinac Railway | Detroit, Michigan - Alpena, Michigan [1921] | 1921-1935 |
| Detroit Night Express | Michigan Central | Chicago, Illinois - Detroit, Michigan (with through cars to northern Michigan) [1916] | 1893-1941 |
| Detroit Night Express | New York Central | Detroit, Michigan - St. Louis, Missouri [1952] | 1952-1958 |
| Detroit Special | New York Central | Chicago, Illinois - Detroit, Michigan [1946] | 1913-1931; 1936–1940; 1946–1948 |
| Detroit Special | Wabash (train renamed train Wabash Cannon Ball in 1950) | St. Louis, Missouri - Detroit, Michigan [1939] | 1939-1949 |
| Detroit - Cleveland Special | New York Central | Detroit, Michigan - Cleveland, Ohio [1927] | 1926-1931 |
| Detroit - Toledo Express | Cleveland, Cincinnati, Chicago and St. Louis Railway | Detroit, Michigan - Cincinnati, Ohio [1923] | 1917-1928 |
| Detroit - Toledo Special | Cleveland, Cincinnati, Chicago and St. Louis Railway | St. Louis, Missouri - Detroit, Michigan [1930] | 1930-1935 |
| Detroit - Washington Limited | Baltimore and Ohio Railroad | Detroit, Michigan - Philadelphia, Pennsylvania [1928] | 1925-1930 |
| Detroit, Grand Rapids and Kalamazoo Express | Michigan Central | Detroit, Michigan - Kalamazoo, Michigan - Grand Rapids, Michigan [1901] | 1895-1906; 1901–1913 |
| Detroiter | New York Central | New York, New York - Detroit, Michigan [1948] | 1911–1958 |
| DeWitt Clinton | New York Central | New York, New York - Toronto, Ontario [1957] | 1927-1946; 1949; 1957–1960 |
| DeWitt Clinton | Amtrak | New York, New York - Albany, New York [1991] | 1974-1980; 1984; 1991 |
| Diamond | Illinois Central Railroad | Chicago, Illinois - St. Louis, Missouri [1918] | 1892-1946 |
| Diplomat | Baltimore and Ohio Railroad, Reading Railroad, Central Railroad of New Jersey | St. Louis, Missouri - Washington, DC - Jersey City, New Jersey [1930] | 1930–1961 |
| Diplomat | Baltimore and Ohio Railroad | Chicago, Illinois - Washington, D.C. [1965] | 1964–1968 |
| Dirigo | Maine Central Railroad Company, Boston and Maine | Boston, Massachusetts - Bangor, Maine [1951] | 1951-1955 |
| Dixiana | Chicago and Eastern Illinois, Louisville and Nashville, Nashville, Chattanooga, and St. Louis, Central of Georgia, Atlantic Coast Line, Florida East Coast | Chicago, Illinois - Miami, Florida [1942] | 1942 |
| Dixie Express | Chicago & Eastern Illinois, Louisville & Nashville | Chicago, Illinois - New Orleans, Louisiana [1945] | 1925-1927; 1932–1933; 1943–1946 |
| Dixie Flagler | Chicago and Eastern Illinois, Louisville and Nashville, Nashville, Chattanooga, and St. Louis, Atlantic Coast Line, Florida East Coast | Chicago, Illinois - Miami, Florida | 1940–1954 |
| Dixie Flyer | Chicago and Eastern Illinois, Louisville and Nashville, Nashville, Chattanooga, and St. Louis, Central of Georgia, Atlantic Coast Line | Chicago, Illinois - Jacksonville, Florida (with through trains to southern Florida many years) [1930] | 1892–1969 |
| Dixie Limited | Chicago and Eastern Illinois, Louisville and Nashville, Nashville, Chattanooga, and St. Louis, Central of Georgia, Atlantic Coast Line, Florida East Coast | Chicago, Illinois - Miami, Florida [1948] | 1923-1953; 1958 |
| Dixie Mail | Chicago and Eastern Illinois Railroad | Chicago, Illinois - Evansville, Indiana [1948] | 1932-1949 |
| Dixieland | Chicago and Eastern Illinois, Louisville and Nashville, Nashville, Chattanooga, and St. Louis, Central of Georgia, Atlantic Coast Line, Florida East Coast | Chicago, Illinois - Miami, Florida - Tampa, Florida [1938] | 1938-1942; 1947–1949; 1955–1957 |
| Dominion | Canadian Pacific, Michigan Central Railroad | Montreal, QC/Toronto, ON – Chicago [1916] | 1915-1920 |
| Dominion Express | Pennsylvania | Washington, DC - Buffalo, New York [1940] | 1913-1958 |
| Dominion-Overseas | Michigan Central Railroad, Canadian Pacific Railway | Chicago, Illinois - Montreal, Quebec [1937] | 1923-1942 |
| Down Easter (group of trains) | New York, New Haven & Hartford, Boston & Maine, Maine Central, Canadian Pacific, Canadian National | New York, New York - Portland, Maine with through cars to Halifax, Nova Scotia, [1927] and through cars to Plymouth, New Hampshire | 1927-1942; 1949–1950 |
| Downeaster | Amtrak | Boston, Massachusetts - Brunswick, Maine [2014] | 2002–present |
| Dubuque Express | Illinois Central | Chicago, Illinois - Waterloo, Iowa [1906] | 1906-2909; 1919–1931 |
| Duluth and Ashland Express | Chicago & North Western | Minneapolis, Minnesota - Duluth, Minnesota [1911] | 1910-1915 |
| Duluth and Boston Express | Duluth, South Shore & Atlantic | Duluth, Minnesota - Sault Ste. Marie, Michigan | ? |
| Duluth and Crookston Night Express | Great Northern | Duluth, Minnesota - Crookston, Minnesota [1906] | 1906-1914 |
| Duluth and Grand Forks Day Express | Great Northern | Duluth, Minnesota - Grand Forks, North Dakota [1910] | 1906-1924 |
| Duluth and Grand Forks Night Express | Great Northern | Duluth, Minnesota - Grand Forks, North Dakota [1923] | 1906-1909; 1915–1946 |
| Duluth Express | Duluth, South Shore & Atlantic | Mackinaw City, Michigan - Duluth, Minnesota [1916] | 1890-1902; 1905–1916 |
| Duluth - Superior Express | Chicago & North Western | Chicago, Illinois - Madison, Wisconsin - Duluth, Minnesota [1911] | 1909-1915 |
| Duluth-Superior Limited | Chicago & North Western | Chicago, Illinois - Madison, Wisconsin - Duluth, Minnesota [1948] | 1900; 1906–1961 |
| Duquesne | Pennsylvania Railroad, in 1968 Penn Central, in 1971 Amtrak | New York, New York - Pittsburgh, Pennsylvania [1952] | 1921-1971 |
| Duquesne Limited (later Duquesne Express) | Baltimore and Ohio Railroad | Jersey City, New Jersey - Pittsburgh, Pennsylvania [1942] | 1900-1917 |

== E ==
| Train Name | Railroad | Train Endpoints in a typical [year] | Operated |
|---|---|---|---|
| Eagle | Amtrak | Chicago, Illinois - St. Louis, Missouri [1989] | 1982-1990; 1997–1999 |
| Early Bird | Alton Railroad | St. Louis, Missouri - Kansas City, Missouri [1908] | 1907-1915 |
| East Coast Champion | Pennsylvania Railroad, Richmond, Fredericksburg and Potomac Railroad, Atlantic Coast Line Railroad, Florida East Coast Railway | New York, New York - Miami, Florida [1952] | 1949-1967 |
| East Coast Express | Florida East Coast Railway | Jacksonville, Florida - Miami, Florida [1944] | 1943-1953 |
| East Coast Flyer | Pere Marquette | Chicago, Illinois - Grand Rapids, Michigan [1930] | 1928-1932 |
| East Wind | Pennsylvania, New York, New Haven & Hartford, Boston & Maine | Washington, DC - Bangor, Maine [1945] | 1940–1942; 1946-1955 |
| East Wind | Amtrak | New York, New York - Boston, Massachusetts [1971] | 1971-1975 |
| Eastern Express | New York Central (and affiliated lines) | New York, New York - Chicago, Illinois (with through cars to several other points) [1916] | 1894-1931 |
| Eastern Express | Pennsylvania | New York, New York - Chicago, Illinois (with through cars to several other points) [1916] | 1885-1942 |
| Eastern Express | Toledo, St. Louis and Western Railroad | St. Louis, Missouri - Toledo, Ohio [1908] | 1902-1908 |
| Eastern Express | Colorado Midland Railway | Denver, Colorado - Grand Junction, Colorado (with through cars to Los Angeles and Chicago) [1908] | 1901-1908; 1914–1916 |
| Eastern Express | Chicago & North Western | Chicago, Illinois - Pueblo, Colorado [1906] | 1902-1914 |
| Eastern Express | Illinois Central | Chicago, Illinois - Cairo, Illinois [1905] | 1904-1908 |
| Eastern Express | Santa Fe | Los Angeles, California - San Francisco, California - Chicago, Illinois [1911] | 1911-1915 |
| Eastern Express | Louisville and Nashville Railroad | Nashville, Tennessee - Birmingham, Alabama (with through cars to New York) [1924] | 1919-1928 |
| Eastern Express | Chicago, Milwaukee, St. Paul and Pacific Railroad | Chicago, Illinois - Minneapolis, Minnesota [1922] | 1921-1924 |
| Eastern Express | Northern Pacific Railway | Minneapolis, Minnesota - Fargo, North Dakota [1924] | 1921-1931 |
| Eastern Limited | Chicago North Shore and Milwaukee Railroad | Chicago, Illinois - Milwaukee, Wisconsin [1930] | 1929-1933 |
| Eastern Mail | Pennsylvania | St. Louis, Missouri - Pittsburgh, Pennsylvania [1924] | 1909-1914; 1921–1924 |
| Eastern Mail | Cleveland, Cincinnati, Chicago and St. Louis Railway | Cleveland, Ohio - Cincinnati, Ohio [1917] | 1917-1918; 1925–1928 |
| Easterner | Missouri Pacific Railroad | Kansas City, Missouri - St. Louis, Missouri [1936] | 1936 |
| Easterner | New York Central | Cleveland, Ohio - New York, New York [1948] | 1929-1931; 1942–1960 |
| Ebb Tide | Long Island Rail Road | New York, New York - Montauk, New York [1965] | 1963-1966 |
| Edison | Pennsylvania | Washington, DC - New York, New York [1948] | 1931-1968 |
| Edison | Amtrak | New York, New York - Philadelphia, Pennsylvania [1980] | 1980-1981 |
| Egypitan | Cleveland, Cincinnati, Chicago and St. Louis Railway | Chicago, Illinois - Evansville, Indiana [1933] | 1930-1942 |
| Egypitan | New York Central | Chicago, Illinois - Harrisburg, Illinois [1955] | 1952-1957 |
| Egyptian Zipper | Chicago and Eastern Illinois Railroad | Danville, Illinois - Cypress, Illinois [1948] | 1937–1946 |
| El Capitan | Santa Fe (Amtrak 1971–1972) | Chicago, Illinois - Los Angeles, California [1940] | 1938–1972 |
| El Paso Express | Southern Pacific (and connecting lines) | Los Angeles, California - San Francisco, California - St. Louis, Missouri [1907] | 1907-1913 |
| El Pasoan | Santa Fe | Albuquerque, New Mexico - El Paso, Texas [1948] | 1948-1968 |
| El Yaqui | Southern Pacific | Nogales, Arizona - Guadalajara, Mexico [1955] | 1952-1964 |
| Electric City Express | Amtrak | New York, New York - Schenectady, New York [1982] | 1981-1994 |
| Electroliner | Chicago North Shore & Milwaukee | Chicago, Illinois - Milwaukee, Wisconsin [1945] | 1941–1963 |
| Eleven Come Seven | Colorado Midland Railway | Denver, Colorado - Cripple Creek, Colorado [1901] | 1900-1904 |
| Eleven O'Clock Katy | Missouri–Kansas–Texas Railroad | Dallas, Texas - San Antonio, Texas [1925] | 1922-1935 |
| Embassy | Pennsylvania Railroad; Penn Central (1969–1971) (Amtrak from 1971) | New York, New York - Washington, DC [1948] | 1933-1971; 1976–1981; 1986–1994; 1997–1998 |
| Empire Builder | Burlington and Great Northern (1929–1970); Burlington Northern (1970 - 1971); Amtrak (1971–present) | Chicago, Illinois - Seattle, Washington - Tacoma, Washington - Portland, Oregon [1948] | 1929–present |
| Empire Express | New York Central, Pittsburgh and Lake Erie Railroad | Pittsburgh, Pennsylvania - Massena, New York - Boston, Massachusetts [1955] | 1931-1955 |
| Empire Limited | Lake Shore and Michigan Southern Railway, Pittsburgh and Lake Erie Railroad | Pittsburgh, Pennsylvania - Buffalo, New York [1920] | 1910-1930 |
| Empire State Express | New York Central | New York, New York - Detroit, Michigan [1948] | 1892-1967 |
| Empire State Express | Amtrak | New York, New York - Buffalo, New York [1982] | 1974-1998 |
| Erie Express | Pennsylvania | Pittsburgh, Pennsylvania - Erie, Pennsylvania [1933] | 1919-1948 |
| Erie Limited | Erie | New York, New York - Chicago, Illinois [1930] | 1929–1961 |
| Erie-Lackawanna Limited | Erie Lackawanna | New York, New York - Chicago, Illinois [1962] | 1961–1963 |
| Ethan Allen Express | Amtrak | New York, New York - Rutland, Vermont [2012] | 1996–present |
| Evansville-Chicago Express | Chicago and Eastern Illinois Railroad | Chicago, Illinois - Evansville, Indiana [1922] | 1919-1924 |
| Evening Keystone | Pennsylvania; Penn Central (1969–1971) | New York, New York - Philadelphia, Pennsylvania [1962] | 1956-1971 |
| Evening Liberty Express | Amtrak | Boston, Massachusetts - Philadelphia, Pennsylvania [1978] | 1978-1979 |
| Evening Metropolitan | Amtrak | Boston, Massachusetts - Washington, DC [1997] | 1997-1998 |
| Evening Steel King | Pittsburgh and Lake Erie Railroad, Baltimore and Ohio Railroad | Baltimore, Maryland - Cleveland, Ohio [1953] | 1953-1962 |
| Everglades | New Haven, Pennsylvania, Atlantic Coast Line, Florida East Coast | Boston, Massachusetts - Miami, Florida (Everglades Limited 1920–1925; many other destinations over its history) [1948] | 1920-1932; 1938; 1946–1971 |
| Executive | Pennsylvania; Penn Central (1969–1971) | New York, New York - Washington, DC [1944] | 1941-1971 |
| Executive | Amtrak | New York, New York - Washington, DC [1988] | 1987-1994 |
| Exposition Flyer | New York Central | New York, New York - Chicago, Illinois [1903] | 1893; 1903; 1933–1934 |
| Exposition Flyer | Chicago, Burlington & Quincy, Denver & Rio Grande Western, Western Pacific | Chicago, Illinois - Oakland, California [1942] | 1939–1949 |

== F ==
| Train Name | Railroad | Train Endpoints in a typical [year] | Operated |
|---|---|---|---|
| Fairfield | Amtrak | New York, New York - New Haven, Connecticut [1992] | 1992-1995 |
| Fall River Line Special | New Haven Railroad | Boston, Massachusetts – New Bedford, Massachusetts and Newport, Rhode Island [1931] | c.1929-c. 1938 |
| Fargo Fast Mail and Express | Santa Fe | Chicago, Illinois - Los Angeles, California [1918] | 1915-1922 |
| Fast Fifteen | Santa Fe | Chicago, Illinois - Galveston, Texas [1938] | 1932-1948 |
| Fast Flying Virginian (later FFV) | Pennsylvania, Chesapeake & Ohio | New York, New York - Cincinnati, Ohio - Norfolk, Virginia - Louisville, Kentucky [1952] | 1889–1968 |
| Fast Mail | Chicago & North Western | Council Bluffs, Iowa - Chicago, Illinois [1959] | 1959-1960 |
| Fast Mail | Great Northern | Seattle, Washington - Minneapolis, Minnesota [1910] | 1906-1960 |
| Fast Mail | Milwaukee Road | Chicago, Illinois - Minneapolis, Minnesota [1913] | 1904-1919; 1927–1971 |
| Fast Mail | Michigan Central | New York, New York - Chicago, Illinois [1904] | 1904-1908 |
| Fast Mail | New York Central | Many different trains and destinations over the years, one example being New York, New York - Boston, Massachusetts - Chicago, Illinois - Massena, New York - Watertown (city), New York [1945] | 1888-1946 |
| Fast Mail | Pennsylvania | Many different trains and destinations over the years, one example being New York, New York - St. Louis, Missouri [1932] | 1896-1932 |
| Fast Mail | Illinois Central | Chicago, Illinois - New Orleans, Louisiana [1945] | 1897-1914; 1922–1940; 1943–1946 |
| Fast Mail | Baltimore and Ohio Railroad | Jersey City, New Jersey - St. Louis, Missouri [1915] | 1900-1916 |
| Fast Mail | Chicago, Indianapolis & Louisville | Chicago, Illinois - Cincinnati, Ohio [1912] | 1899-1914 |
| Fast Mail | Rock Island | Memphis, Tennessee - Amarillo, Texas [1911] | 1911-1918; 1932 |
| Fast Mail | Union Pacific Railroad | Chicago, Illinois - Portland, Oregon [1914] | 1914-1920 |
| Fast Mail | Missouri Pacific Railroad | St. Louis, Missouri - Kansas City, Missouri [1917] | 1916-1924 |
| Fast Mail | Alton Railroad | Chicago, Illinois - St. Louis, Missouri [1924] | 1922-1925; 1936–1945 |
| Fast Mail | Santa Fe | Chicago, Illinois - Kansas City, Missouri [1925] | 1902-1910; 1916–1942 |
| Fast Mail | Chicago, Burlington and Quincy Railroad | Chicago, Illinois - Lincoln, Nebraska [1932] | 1930-1953 |
| Fast Mail | Amtrak | Washington, DC - Boston, Massachusetts [1985] | 1984-1998 |
| Fast Pittsfield and North Adams Special | New York Central | New York, New York - North Adams, Massachusetts [1902] | 1901-1906 |
| Fast Western Express | Michigan Central Railroad and affiliated lines | Boston, Massachusetts - Chicago, Illinois - Cincinnati, Ohio [1890] | 1885-1905 |
| Feather River Express | Western Pacific Railroad | San Francisco, California - Portola, California [1931] | 1931-1932; 1939–1948 |
| Federal / Federal Express | New Haven; Pennsylvania; Penn Central (1969–1971) | Washington, DC - Boston, Massachusestts | 1894–1971; 2003 (Amtrak) |
| Fifth Avenue Special | New York Central | Chicago, Illinois - New York, New York [1952] | 1921-1967 |
| Fireball | Ann Arbor | Toledo, Ohio - Frankfort, Michigan | ? |
| Firefly | Frisco | Kansas City, Missouri - Oklahoma City, Oklahoma [1952] | 1939–1960 |
| Firefly | Rock Island | Kansas City, Missouri - Dallas, Texas [1915] | 1911-1938 |
| First State | Amtrak | New York, New York - Wilmington, Delaware [1984] | 1984-1994 |
| Fisherman | Chicago, Milwaukee, St. Paul and Pacific Railroad | Chicago, Illinois - Star Lake, Wisconsin [1936] | 1936-1940 |
| Fisherman's Special | Long Island Rail Road | Jamaica, Queens, New York - Canoe Place, Hampton Bays, New York or Montauk, New York | 1932–1973 |
| Fisherman's Special | Pennsylvania-Reading Seashore Lines | Philadelphia, Pennsylvania - Cape May Harbor, New Jersey [1940] | 1940-c.1941 |
| Fisherman's Special | Detroit and Mackinac Railway | Detroit, Michigan - Alpena, Michigan [1943] | 1943-1949 |
| Five Hour Train | Baltimore and Ohio Railroad | Jersey City, New Jersey - Washington, DC [1910] | 1904-1910 |
| Flambeau 400 | Chicago and North Western | Chicago, Illinois - Green Bay, Wisconsin - Ashland, Wisconsin (1936-1950 just the Flambeau) | 1936–1971 |
| Flamingo | New York Central; Pennsylvania; Louisville & Nashville; Central of Georgia; Atlantic Coast Line; Florida East Coast | Cincinnati, Ohio - Miami, Florida (but many other destinations over the years) [1952] | 1925-1962 |
| Flamingo | Pennsylvania Railroad, Richmond, Fredericksburg and Potomac Railroad; Seaboard Air Line Railroad | New York, New York - Miami, Florida [1910] | 1909-1918 |
| Florida Arrow | Pennsylvania; Louisville & Nashville; Atlantic Coast Line; Florida East Coast | Chicago, Illinois - Miami, Florida - St. Petersburg, Florida [1935] | 1935-1942; 1948–1949 |
| Florida Limited | Cleveland, Cincinnati, Chicago and St. Louis Railway, Queen and Crescent Route, Southern Railway, Florida East Coast Railway | Chicago, Illinois - St. Augustine, Florida (this train was perhaps also called 'Florida Special') [1909] | 1901-1910 |
| Florida Mail | Pennsylvania Railroad, Richmond, Fredericksburg and Potomac Railroad, Atlantic Coast Line Railroad | New York, New York - Jacksonville, Florida [1911] | 1911-1918 |
| Florida Mail | Richmond, Fredericksburg and Potomac Railroad, Atlantic Coast Line Railroad | Washington, DC - Jacksonville, Florida [1952] | 1943-1957 |
| Florida Special | Pennsylvania Railroad, Richmond, Fredericksburg and Potomac Railroad, Atlantic Coast Line Railroad, Florida East Coast Railway (Amtrak 1971–1972) | New York, New York - Miami, Florida [1923] | 1888-1972 |
| Florida Sunbeam | Southern Railway; Seaboard Air Line Railroad | Cincinnati, Ohio - St. Petersburg, Florida and Miami, Florida [1940] | 1936-1949 |
| Florida-Cuba Special | Pennsylvania Railroad, Richmond, Fredericksburg and Potomac Railroad; Seaboard Air Line Railroad | New York, New York - Tampa, Florida [1912] | 1911-1923 |
| Floridan | Illinois Central Railroad, Central Railroad of Georgia, Atlantic Coast Line Railroad, Florida East Coast Railway | Chicago, Illinois - Miami, Florida [1928] | 1923-1941 |
| Floridian | Amtrak | Chicago, Illinois - St. Petersburg, Florida - Miami, Florida [1973] | 1971-1979 |
| Floridian | Amtrak | Chicago, Illinois - Miami, Florida | 2024 (planned |
| Flyer | | | see Katy Flyer |
| Flying Crow | Kansas City Southern | Kansas City, Missouri - Port Arthur, Texas - New Orleans, Louisiana [1948] | 1928–1968 |
| Flying Spray | Pennsylvania Railroad | New York, New York - Atlantic City, New Jersey [1937] | 1937-1942 |
| Flying Yankee | Boston & Maine, Maine Central | Bangor, Maine - Boston, Massachusetts [1952] | 1927-1958 |
| Flying Yankee | Amtrak | New York, New York - Boston, Massachusetts [1975] | 1974-1977 |
| Foggy Bottom | Amtrak | New York, New York - Washington, DC [1997] | 1997-1998 |
| Forest City | New York Central | Chicago, Illinois - Buffalo, New York [1948] | 1928-1964 |
| Forest City Limited | Cleveland, Cincinnati, Chicago and St. Louis Railway | Columbus, Ohio - Cleveland, Ohio - Detroit, Michigan [1917] | 1917-1918; 1923–1929 |
| Fort Crevecouer | Illinois Terminal Railroad | St. Louis, Missouri - Peoria, Illinois [1950] | 1949–1956 |
| Fort Dearborn | Pennsylvania, Chesapeake & Ohio | New York, New York - Chicago, Illinois (with sections to Cincinnati, Ohio and Detroit, Michigan) [1933] | 1932-1938 |
| Fort Dodge Day Express | Illinois Central | Chicago, Illinois - Fort Dodge, Iowa [1908] | 1906-1911 |
| Fort Dodge Express | Illinois Central | Chicago, Illinois - Fort Dodge, Iowa [1929] | 1919-1930 |
| Fort Dodge-Chicago Day Express | Chicago Great Western Railway | Chicago, Illinois - Fort Dodge, Iowa [1914] | 1913-1917 |
| Fort Hayes | Pennsylvania Railroad | Chicago, Illinois - Columbus, Ohio [1952] | 1935-1956 |
| Fort Orange | New York Central | New York, New York - Syracuse, New York [1930] | 1926-1939 |
| Fort Pitt | Pennsylvania Railroad | Chicago, Illinois - Pittsburgh, Pennsylvania [1948] | 1947-1968 |
| Fort Pitt | Amtrak | Pittsburgh, Pennsylvania - Altoona, Pennsylvania [1981] | 1981–1983 |
| Fort Pitt Limited | Baltimore and Ohio Railroad, Reading Railroad, Central Railroad of New Jersey | Jersey City, New Jersey - Chicago, Illinois [1937] | 1928-1940 |
| Forty-Niner | Union Pacific, Chicago and North Western | Chicago, Illinois - San Francisco, California [1940] | 1937–1941 |
| Forty-Second Street Express | New Haven | New York, New York - Boston, Massachusetts [1944] | 1938-1968 |
| FrontRunner | Utah Transit Authority | Provo, Utah - Salt Lake City, Utah - Pleasant View, Utah [2014] | 2008–present |
| Furlough | Pennsylvania Railroad | New York, New York - Cape Charles, Virginia [1947] | 1944-1955 |
| Furniture City Special | Pere Marquette | Chicago, Illinois - Muskegon, Michigan (and other points in Northern Michigan) [1920] | 1920-1936 |

== G ==
| Train Name | Railroad | Train Endpoints in a typical [year] | Operated |
|---|---|---|---|
| Garden State | Amtrak | New York, New York - Philadelphia, Pennsylvania [1980] | 1980-1981; 1955 |
| Garden State Limited | Delaware, Lackawanna and Western Railroad | New York, New York - Buffalo, New York [1927] | 1927-1933 |
| Garden State Special | Amtrak | New York, New York - Washington, DC [1984] | 1983-1990 |
| Gateway | Baltimore & Ohio | Chicago, Illinois - Pittsburgh, Pennsylvania [1969] | 1969 |
| Gateway | New York Central | Cleveland, Ohio - St. Louis, Missouri [1948] | 1930-1959 |
| General | Pennsylvania | New York, New York - Chicago, Illinois [1937] | 1937-1967 |
| General Custer | Chicago, Burlington & Quincy, Northern Pacific Railway | Kansas City, Missouri - Seattle, Washington - Portland, Oregon [1938] | 1936-1942 |
| General Pershing Zephyr | Chicago, Burlington & Quincy | St. Louis, Missouri - Kansas City, Missouri [1941] | 1939-1942; 1948 |
| General Wood | | St. Louis, Missouri - San Francisco, California | ? |
| Genesee | New York Central | Buffalo, New York - New York, New York [1952] | 1927-1952 |
| George Washington | Chesapeake and Ohio Railway, Pennsylvania Railroad | Cincinnati, Ohio and Louisville, Kentucky - Washington, DC - New York, New York - Phoebus, Virginia (with through trains to other destinations) [1952] | 1932–1971 |
| George Washington | Amtrak | Boston, Massachusetts - Cincinnati, Ohio - Chicago, Illinois [1971] | 1971-1973 |
| George Washington | Amtrak | New York, New York - Washington, DC [1982] | 1982 |
| Georgetown | Amtrak | New York, New York - Washington, DC [1997] | 1997-1998 |
| Georgia Cannonball | Georgia Railroad | Atlanta, Georgia - Augusta, Georgia | ?-1983 |
| Georgian | Louisville & Nashville, Nashville, Chattanooga & St. Louis, Atlantic Coast Line Railroad, Florida East Coast Railway | Chicago, Illinois and St. Louis, Illinois - Atlanta, Georgia (but many other destinations over the years) [1949] | 1929-1931; 1947–1968 |
| Gilt Edge | New Haven | New York, New York - Boston, Massachusetts [1944] | 1891-1968 |
| Glacier Discovery | Alaska Railroad | Anchorage, Alaska - Whittier, Alaska [2012] | -present |
| Glacier Park Limited | Great Northern Railway | Minneapolis, Minnesota - St. Paul, Minnesota - Seattle, Washington [1928] | |
| Gold Coast | Chicago & North Western; Union Pacific; Southern Pacific | Chicago, Illinois - Oakland, California (aka Gold Coast Limited; many different destinations over the years) [1929] | 1927-1932; 1947–1954 |
| Gold Runner | Amtrak | Oakland, California and Sacramento, California - Bakersfield, California | 2025- |
| Golden Arrow | Pennsylvania | New York, New York - Chicago, Illinois [1930] | 1929–1946 |
| Golden Gate | Santa Fe | Oakland, California - Bakersfield, California [1953] | 1948-1964 |
| Golden Gate Special | Union Pacific | Omaha, Nebraska - San Francisco, California | ? |
| Golden Rocket | Rock Island and Southern Pacific | Chicago, Illinois - Los Angeles, California | (cancelled before it could start in 1948) |
| Golden Special | Chicago & North Western | Chicago, Illinois - Milwaukee, Wisconsin [1915] | 1914-1928 |
| Golden State | Southern Pacific and Rock Island | Chicago, Illinois - Los Angeles, California [1950] | 1947–1968 |
| Golden State Limited | Southern Pacific and Rock Island | Chicago, Illinois - Los Angeles, California [1921] | 1902-1947 then renamed Golden State (see above entry). |
| Golden Triangle | Pennsylvania | Chicago, Illinois - Pittsburgh, Pennsylvania [1944] | 1938-1966 |
| Goldenrod | Southern Railway | Birmingham, Alabama - Mobile, Alabama [1952] | 1939-1958 |
| Gopher | Great Northern | Minneapolis, Minnesota - St. Paul, Minnesota - Duluth, Minnesota - Superior, Wisconsin [1933] | 1925-1971 |
| Gopher State Express | Great Northern | Minneapolis, Minnesota - St. Paul, Minnesota - Duluth, Minnesota - Superior, Wisconsin [1920] | 1904-1924 |
| Gotham | Amtrak | New York, New York - Philadelphia, Pennsylvania [1980] | 1980-1981 |
| Gotham Limited | Amtrak | New York, New York - Newport News, Virginia [1997] | 1997-1998 |
| Gotham Limited | Pennsylvania | Chicago, Illinois - New York, New York [1922] | 1922-1956 |
| Government Fast Mail | Missouri Pacific | St. Louis, Missouri - Denver, Colorado [1900] | 1897-1905 |
| Governor | St. Louis-San Francisco | Oklahoma City, Oklahoma - Tulsa, Oklahoma - Joplin, Missouri [1921] | 1914-1918; 1921–1931 |
| Governor | Pennsylvania | Philadelphia, Pennsylvania - Harrisburg, Pennsylvania [1952] | 1937-1956 |
| Governor's Special | Illinois Central | Chicago, Illinois - Springfield, Illinois [1970] | 1968–1971 |
| Grand Canyon | Santa Fe | Chicago, Illinois - Los Angeles, California - Oakland, California [1952] | 1929-1971 |
| Grand Forks and Duluth Night Express | Great Northern | Duluth, Minnesota - Grand Forks, North Dakota [1933] | 1928-1946 |
| Grand Rapids and Chicago Express | Michigan Central, Grand Rapids and Indiana Railroad | Chicago, Illinois - Grand Rapids, Michigan [1916] | 1901-1918 |
| Grand Rapids and Chicago Night Express | Michigan Central | Chicago, Illinois - Grand Rapids, Michigan [1908] | 1906-1914 |
| Grand Rapids Express | Michigan Central | Chicago, Illinois - Grand Rapids, Michigan [1918] | 1890-1918 |
| Grand Rapids Limited | Pere Marquette Railway | Chicago, Illinois - Grand Rapids, Michigan [1923] | 1920-1926 |
| Grand Rapids- Detroit Express | Michigan Central | Detroit, Michigan - Grand Rapids, Michigan [1914] | 1913-1918 |
| Grand Rapids, Kalamazoo and Detroit Express | Michigan Central | Detroit, Michigan - Grand Rapids, Michigan - Kalamazoo, Michigan [1902] | 1895-1912 |
| Great Lakes Aerotrain | New York Central | Chicago, Illinois - Cleveland, Ohio [1956] | 1956 |
| Great Lakes Limited | Baltimore and Ohio Railroad | Detroit, Michigan - Cincinnati, Ohio [1937]; Detroit - Louisville, Kentucky (1949) | 1929-1934; 1937–1950 |
| Great Northern Express | Great Northern, Chicago, Burlington and Quincy Railroad | Kansas City, Missouri - Seattle, Washington [1914] | 1909-1929 |
| Great Northern Flyer | Great Northern | Minneapolis–Saint Paul - Seattle, Washington [1903] | 1899-1905 |
| Great Valley Flyer | SEPTA | Thorndale, Pennsylvania - Philadelphia, Pennsylvania | Unknown- |
| Great Western Limited | Chicago Great Western | Chicago, Illinois - Minneapolis, Minnesota [1913] | 1898-1924 |
| Great Western Special | Chicago Great Western | Chicago, Illinois - Minneapolis, Minnesota [1916] | 1914-1922 |
| Green Bay 400 | Chicago & North Western | Chicago, Illinois - Green Bay, Wisconsin [1960] | 1959-1968 |
| Green Diamond | Illinois Central | Chicago, Illinois - St. Louis, Missouri | 1936–1968 |
| Green Mountain Flyer | Boston & Maine, New York Central Railroad; Rutland, and Canadian National | Boston, Massachusetts/New York City - Montreal, Quebec [1930] | 1892-1896; 1900–1917; 1928–1953 |
| Greylock | Boston and Maine | Boston, Massachusetts - Troy, New York [1952] | 1951-1956 |
| Gulf Breeze | Amtrak | Birmingham, Alabama - Mobile, Alabama [1994] | 1991–1994 |
| Gulf Coast Express | Kansas City Southern Railway | Kansas City, Missouri - Port Arthur, Texas [1925] | 1925-1928 |
| Gulf Coast Limited | Pennsylvania Railroad, Richmond, Fredericksburg and Potomac Railroad, Atlantic Coast Line Railroad | New York, New York - St. Petersburg, Florida [1930] | 1927-1939 |
| Gulf Coast Limited | Amtrak | Mobile, Alabama - New Orleans, Louisiana [1984] | 1984–1985 |
| Gulf Coast Rebel | Gulf, Mobile & Ohio | St. Louis, Missouri - Mobile, Alabama [1943] | 1940–1958 |
| Gulf Coast Special | Colorado and Southern | Denver, Colorado - Dallas, Texas [1940] | 1940-1948 |
| Gulf Coast Special | Mobile & Ohio | St. Louis, Missouri - Mobile, Alabama [1928] | 1927–1940 |
| Gulf Coast Special | Pennsylvania Railroad, Richmond, Fredericksburg and Potomac Railroad, Atlantic Coast Line Railroad (1967-1971: as Seaboard Coast Line) | New York, New York - Tampa, Florida [1964] | 1964-1971 |
| Gulf Stream | Florida East Coast Railway | Jacksonville, Florida - Miami, Florida (many more destinations in earlier years) [1952] | 1929-1932; 1938; 1941–1942; 1947–1953 |
| Gulf Wind | Louisville and Nashville, Seaboard Air Line (1967-1971: as Seaboard Coast Line) | New Orleans, Louisiana - Jacksonville, Florida [1953] | 1949–1971 |
| The Gull | Boston & Maine, Maine Central, Canadian Pacific, and Canadian National | Boston, Massachusetts - Halifax, Nova Scotia [1933] | 1929-1960 |

== H ==
| Train Name | Railroad | Train Endpoints in a typical [year] | Operated |
|---|---|---|---|
| Half Moon | Amtrak | New York, New York – Albany, New York [1994] | 1994-1995 |
| Hampton Express | Long Island Rail Road | New York, New York – Montauk, New York [1930] | 1928-1941; 1947–1949 |
| Harpooner | New Haven Railroad | New York, New York – New Bedford, Massachusetts and Newport, Rhode Island [1931] | c.1929-c. 1931 |
| Harrisburg Express | Pennsylvania | New York, New York – Pittsburgh, Pennsylvania [1926] | 1906-1910; 1919–1930 |
| Harrisburg Special | Reading Railroad, Central Railroad of New Jersey | Harrisburg, Pennsylvania – Jersey City, New Jersey [1918] | 1910-1953 |
| Harrisburg-New Yorker | Reading Railroad, Central Railroad of New Jersey | Harrisburg, Pennsylvania – Jersey City, New Jersey [1924] | 1919-1953 |
| Harrisburger | Central Railroad of New Jersey | Harrisburg, Pennsylvania – Jersey City, New Jersey [1955] | 1954-1963 |
| Hartford Line Express | New Haven | New York, New York – Boston, Massachusetts [1901] | 1901-1913 |
| Havana Special | Pennsylvania, Richmond, Fredericksburg & Potomac, Atlantic Coast Line, Florida East Coast | New York, New York – Key West, Florida (to 1935) [1918] New York, New York – Miami, Florida (destinations vary considerably by year) | 1917-1963 |
| Hawkeye | Illinois Central | Chicago, Illinois – Sioux City, Iowa [1963] | 1922-1971 |
| Heartland Flyer | Amtrak | Oklahoma City, Oklahoma – Fort Worth, Texas [2010] | 1999–present |
| HeartToHub | Massachusetts Bay Transportation Authority | Boston, Massachusetts – Worcester, Massachusetts [2019] | 2016-2020; 2022-2023 |
| Hell Gate | New Haven | New York, New York – Boston, Massachusetts (Hell Gate Express, 1926–1937; 1942–1949) [1953] | 1959-1969 |
| Hendrick Hudson | New York Central, Amtrak (from 1989) | Albany, New York – New York, New York [1960] | 1957-1966; 1989–1994 |
| Hendrik Hudson | Baltimore and Ohio Railroad | Jersey City, New Jersey – Washington, DC [1933] | 1931-1935 |
| Henry Hudson | New York Central | Chicago, Illinois – New York, New York (endpoints vary by year) [1945] | 1939-1942; 1945–1946 |
| Henry Hudson | Amtrak | New York, New York – Albany, New York [1976] | 1974-1980 |
| Henry M. Flagler | Florida East Coast | Jacksonville, Florida – Miami, Florida [1940] | 1939–1940 |
| Herald Square | Amtrak | New York, New York – Philadelphia, Pennsylvania [1980] | 1980-1982; 1995 |
| Hiawatha | Amtrak | Chicago, Illinois – Minneapolis, Minnesota [1971] | 1971-1973 |
| Hiawatha | Milwaukee Road | Chicago, Illinois – Minneapolis, Minnesota [1943] | 1936-1955 |
| Hilltopper | Amtrak | Boston, Massachusetts – Catlettsburg, Kentucky [1977] | 1977-1979 |
| Hoosier | Monon Railroad | Chicago, Illinois – Indianapolis, Indiana (at times called the Hoosier Limited) [1912] | 1911-1958 |
| Hoosier State | Amtrak | Chicago, Illinois – Indianapolis, Indiana [2010] | 1980-1985; 1988–1995; 1999; 2004–2019 |
| Hopi | Santa Fe | Chicago, Illinois – Los Angeles, California [1929] | 1929-1932 |
| Hot Springs Limited | Rock Island | St. Louis, Missouri – Hot Springs, Arkansas [1925] | 1924–1948 |
| Hot Springs Limited | Illinois Central | Chicago, Illinois – Hot Springs, Arkansas [1916] | 1913-1918 |
| Hot Springs Special | Missouri Pacific | St. Louis, Missouri – Hot Springs, Arkansas [1936] | 1902-1907; 1917–1926; 1929–1949 |
| Hot Springs-Panama Limited | Rock Island | Memphis, Tennessee – Hot Springs, Arkansas [1925] | 1925-1932 |
| Housatonic Express | New Haven | New York, New York – Pittsfield, Massachusetts [1952] | 1940; 1949–1955 |
| Houstonian | Missouri Pacific | New Orleans, Louisiana – Houston, Texas [1952] | 1925-1963 |
| Hub | New Haven | New York, New York – Boston, Massachusetts [1944] | 1925-1931; 1942–1951; 1957 |
| Hudson Highlander | Amtrak | New York, New York – Albany, New York [1988] | 1981-1995 |
| Hudson River and Mohawk Express | West Shore Railroad | New York, New York – Albany, New York [1916] | 1897-1916 |
| Hudson River Express | West Shore Railroad (later New York Central Railroad) | New York, New York – Albany, New York (different endpoints in earlier years) [1924] | 1892-1914; 1917; 1923–1942; 1951–1956 |
| Hudson River Express | Amtrak | New York, New York – Albany, New York [1988] | 1986-1990 |
| Hudson River Limited | New York Central and its affiliated lines | New York, New York – Cincinnati, Ohio [1925] | 1923-1928 |
| Hudson River Special | New York Central | New York, New York – Syracuse, New York (the name might be a variant of 'Hudson River Express') [1937] | 1906-1914; 1927–1941; 1957 |
| Hummer | Alton | Chicago, Illinois – Kansas City, Missouri [1923] | 1906-1946 |
| Humming Bird | Louisville & Nashville, Chicago and Eastern Illinois Railroad | Chicago, Illinois - St. Louis, Missouri (originally Cincinnati, Ohio) – New Orleans, Louisiana (endpoints differ considerably by year) [1951] | 1946–1969 |
| Hunterdon Hills Express | Central Railroad of New Jersey | Jersey City, New Jersey – Hampton, New Jersey [1948] | 1947-1953 |
| Huron Shore Express | Detroit and Mackinac Railway | Bay City, Michigan – Alpena, Michigan | ? |
| Hurricane Turn | Alaska Railroad | Talkeetna, Alaska – Hurricane Gulch, Alaska | |
| Hustler | Southern Pacific | Dallas, Texas – Houston, Texas [1938] | 1923-1931; 1938–1954 |
| Hustler | Louisiana and Arkansas Railway | New Orleans, Louisiana – Shreveport, Louisiana [1935] | 1933-1939 |
