= John Francis Nash =

American railroad executive

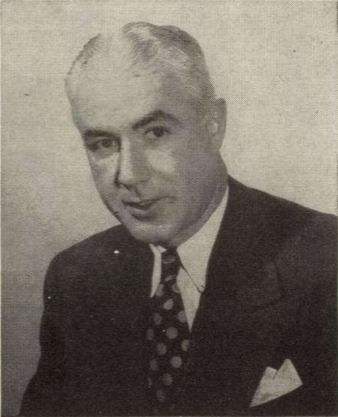
- Nash in 1956
- Born: September 18, 1909; Syracuse, New York
- Died: August 29, 2004 (aged 94)
- Occupation: American railroad executive

John Francis Nash (September 18, 1909 – August 29, 2004) was an American railroad executive. He served as president of the Pittsburgh and Lake Erie Railroad and later the Lehigh Valley Railroad.

== Biography ==
Nash was born in Syracuse, New York, to Roger and Mary Nash. His career began in 1925, at the age of fifteen, when the New York Central Railroad hired him as a freight station clerk in his native Syracuse. He married Ethel Howey in 1931; they had one daughter, Jan Perry. He worked his way up through the New York Central over the next 27 years. He was promoted to traveling car agent in 1941, assistant trainmaster (later trainmaster) in Buffalo, New York in 1942, assistant to the general manager back at Syracuse in 1948, then assistant superintendent in Boston, Massachusetts. In 1950 he became superintendent in Albany, New York; the following year he was made general manager of the Boston and Albany Railroad (B&A), a New York Central subsidiary.

Nash was elected vice president of the Pittsburgh and Lake Erie Railroad, another New York Central subsidiary, in July 1952. He was named president in January 1956. Nash was president for just a few months, with John W. Barriger III succeeding him in July. Nash returned to the New York Central as vice president of operations. He was promoted to senior vice president in 1963. Nash departed the New York Central system to become president of the ailing Lehigh Valley Railroad, then controlled by the Pennsylvania Railroad, on October 28, 1965.

The Lehigh had not been profitable since 1956, and toward the end of the 1960s depended on its owner, first the Pennsylvania and then Penn Central, to keep afloat. It followed the Penn Central into bankruptcy in July 1970. The bankruptcy court appointed Nash and Robert Haldeman as bankruptcy trustees; Nash also held the title of chief operating officer. Nash resigned as co-trustee in August 1974 after a salary dispute with the Interstate Commerce Commission. He took the title of president and chief executive officer until his retirement in January 1975, at the age of 65.

After his retirement, Nash moved to Florida and was an active member of the Boca Raton Historical Society. Nash died on August 29, 2004.
