= Monon Railroad =

Defunct American Class I railway

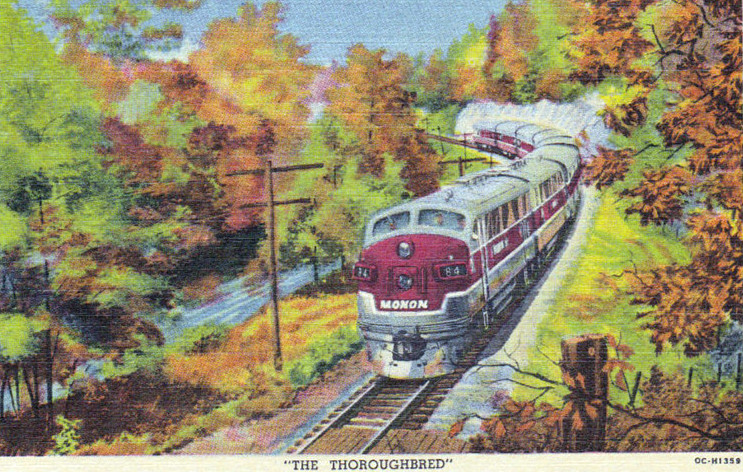
- A postcard depiction of the Thoroughbred, with an EMD F3 in the lead

Overview
- Headquarters: Chicago, Illinois
- Reporting mark: CIL, MON
- Locale: Illinois, Indiana, and Kentucky
- Dates of operation: 1897–1971
- Successor: Louisville and Nashville

Technical
- Track gauge: 4 ft 8 1/2 in (1,435 mm)

The Monon Railroad (reporting mark MON), also known as the Chicago, Indianapolis, and Louisville Railway (reporting mark CIL) from 1897 to 1971, was an American railroad that operated almost entirely within the state of Indiana. The Monon was merged into the Louisville and Nashville Railroad in 1971, and much of the former Monon right of way is owned today by CSX Transportation. In 1970, it operated 540 miles (870 km) of road on 792 miles (1,275 km) of track; that year it reported 1320 million ton-miles of revenue freight and zero passenger-miles. (It also showed zero miles of double track, the longest such Class I railroad in the country.)

== Timeline ==
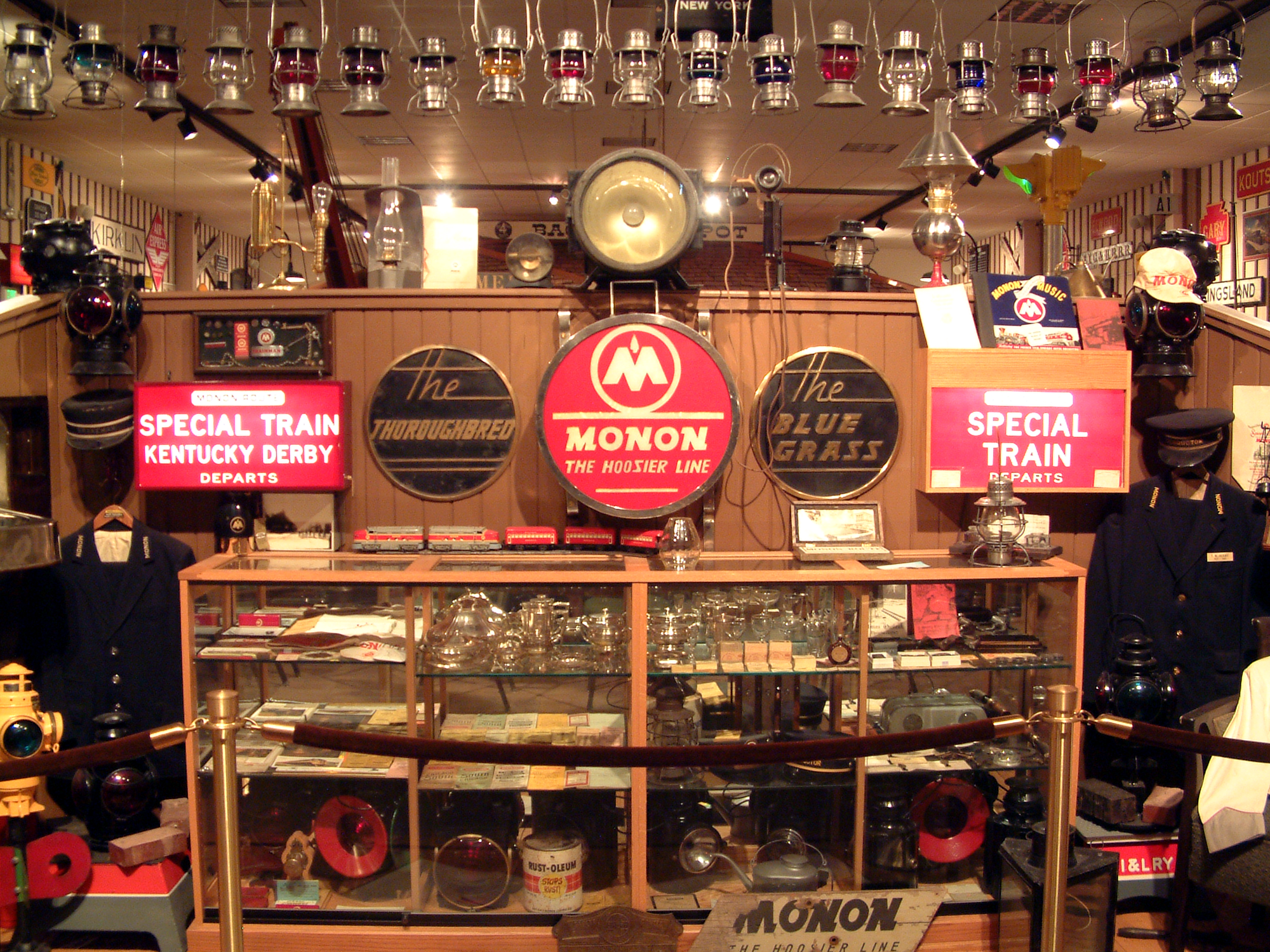
Railroad artifacts on display at the Monon Connection Museum

- 1847: The New Albany and Salem Railroad (NA&S) is organized with James Brooks as president.
- 1854: The NA&S trackage stretches from the Ohio River (at New Albany) to Lake Michigan (at Michigan City).
- 1859: The overextended and struggling NA&S is renamed the Louisville, New Albany and Chicago Railroad (LNA&C).
- April 30, 1865: The LNA&C becomes one of twenty railroads to haul Abraham Lincoln's funeral train, its portion being from Lafayette to Michigan City, Indiana.
- 1873: The LNA&C Railroad is reorganized as the Louisville, New Albany and Chicago Railway.
- 1881: The LNA&C consolidates with the Chicago and Indianapolis Air Line Railway, and the trackage of the new division is soon extended to reach into its namesake cities.
- July 1, 1897: The LNA&C is reorganized as the Chicago, Indianapolis, and Louisville Railway.
- 1932: The 300 pound (136 kg) Monon Bell is first presented as the trophy of the annual football game between DePauw University and Wabash College.
- 1946: John W. Barriger III becomes president of the Monon, bringing aggressive plans for modernization.
- June 29, 1949: Final day of steam locomotive service, as the Monon becomes one of the first Class I railroads to fully convert to diesel motive power.
- January 11, 1956: The CI&L officially adopts its longtime nickname, Monon, as its corporate title.
- 1959: The Monon's passenger service between Chicago and Indianapolis is discontinued. By 1965, only the Thoroughbred remained, with its single daily roundtrip from Chicago to Louisville.
- September 30, 1967: Final day of regularly scheduled passenger train service on the Monon.
- March 21, 1968: Merger with Louisville and Nashville Railroad announced to placate the Monon's fear of lost business due to L&N's acquisition of a competing route, the Chicago and Eastern Illinois Railroad.
- July 31, 1971: The Monon is merged into the Louisville and Nashville Railroad.
- 1972-1979: Amtrak operates the Floridian Chicago-Miami service over the former Monon Railroad's tracks in Indiana. With the termination of this service in 1979, Bloomington, Indiana, and the rest of southern Indiana lose passenger railway service.
- 1999: Portions of the line around Indianapolis are converted to a bicycle and pedestrian trail known as the Monon Trail.
- 2004: CSX Transportation stops using the former Monon Railroad's tracks through Bloomington, Indiana. Over the next decade, Bloomington sections of the tracks are converted to the B-Line Trail (within the city proper) and the Rail-Trail (south of the city).
- After 2009, the tracks between Munster and Hammond, Indiana, are removed and the line converted into another section of the Monon Trail.
- 2024: CSX unveils ES44AH No. 1897 (ex-CSXT 3058), from the CSX paint shops in Waycross, Georgia. The unit is designed with the cab staying in YN3C and the long hood being painted in the Monon Gold and Black scheme used on freight locomotives. It was numbered #1897 in homage of when the Monon was formed.
- 2026: The South Shore Line (of the Northern Indiana Commuter Transportation District) opens its Monon Corridor line using a rebuilt and newly electrified portion of the old Monon Railroad's route from Hammond through Munster to the northern edge of Dyer. The project included constructing some new and relocated sections of the adjacent Monon Trail.

== Colleges served ==
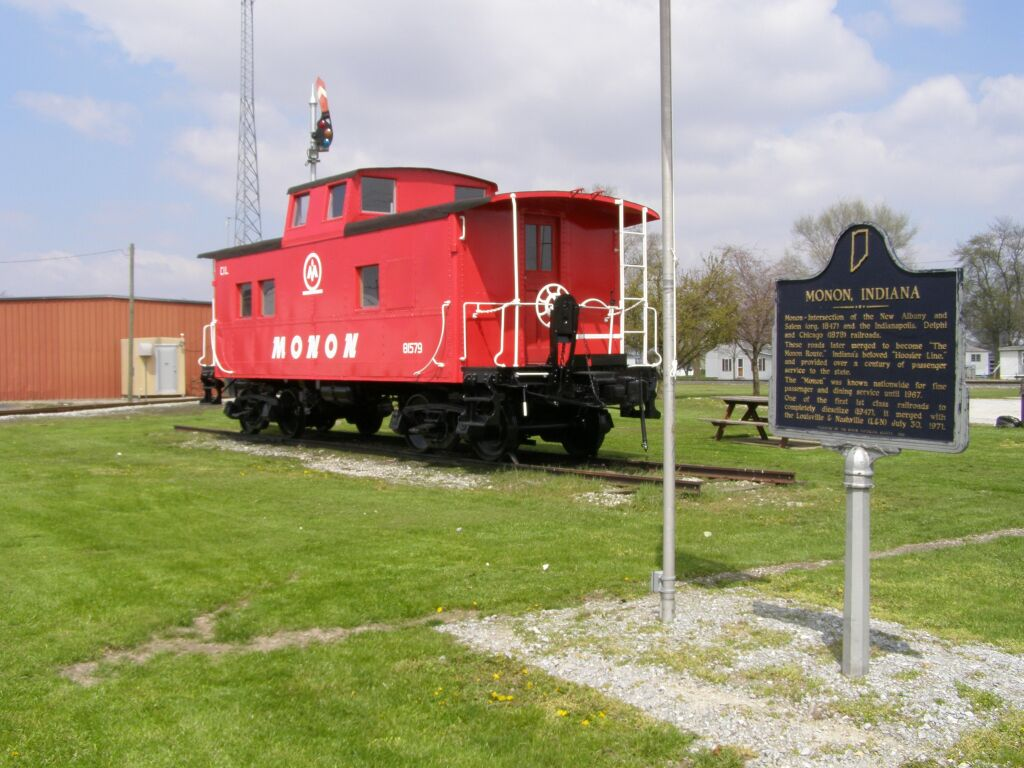
Restored Reading Railroad caboose painted as a Monon, in Monon, Indiana

The Monon served seven colleges and universities along its line:

- Purdue University in West Lafayette, Indiana
- Wabash College in Crawfordsville, Indiana
- DePauw University in Greencastle, Indiana
- Indiana University in Bloomington, Indiana
- Butler University in Indianapolis, Indiana
- St. Joseph's College in Rensselaer, Indiana
- West Baden Northwood Institute/College in West Baden Springs, Indiana.

The university traffic was important enough to the Monon that the railroad used the schools' colors on its rolling stock. The red and white of Wabash College (and similar to the colors of Indiana University) was used on the railroad's passenger equipment, and the black and gold used by both DePauw University and Purdue University adorned the railroad's diesel freight locomotives and later replaced the red and white on passenger equipment as well.

== Genealogy ==
- Monon Railroad
  - Chicago and South Atlantic Railroad 1879
  - Chicago, Indianapolis, and Louisville Railroad 1956
    - Chicago and Wabash Valley Railroad 1914
    - Indianapolis and Louisville Railroad 1916
    - Louisville, New Albany and Chicago Railroad 1898
      - Bedford and Bloomfield Railroad 1886
      - Chicago and Indianapolis Air Line Railway 1883
      - Indianapolis, Delphi and Chicago Railroad 1881
      - New Albany and Salem Railroad 1873
        - Crawfordsville and Wabash Railroad 1852
      - Orleans, Paoli and Jasper Railway 1886

== Monon route ==
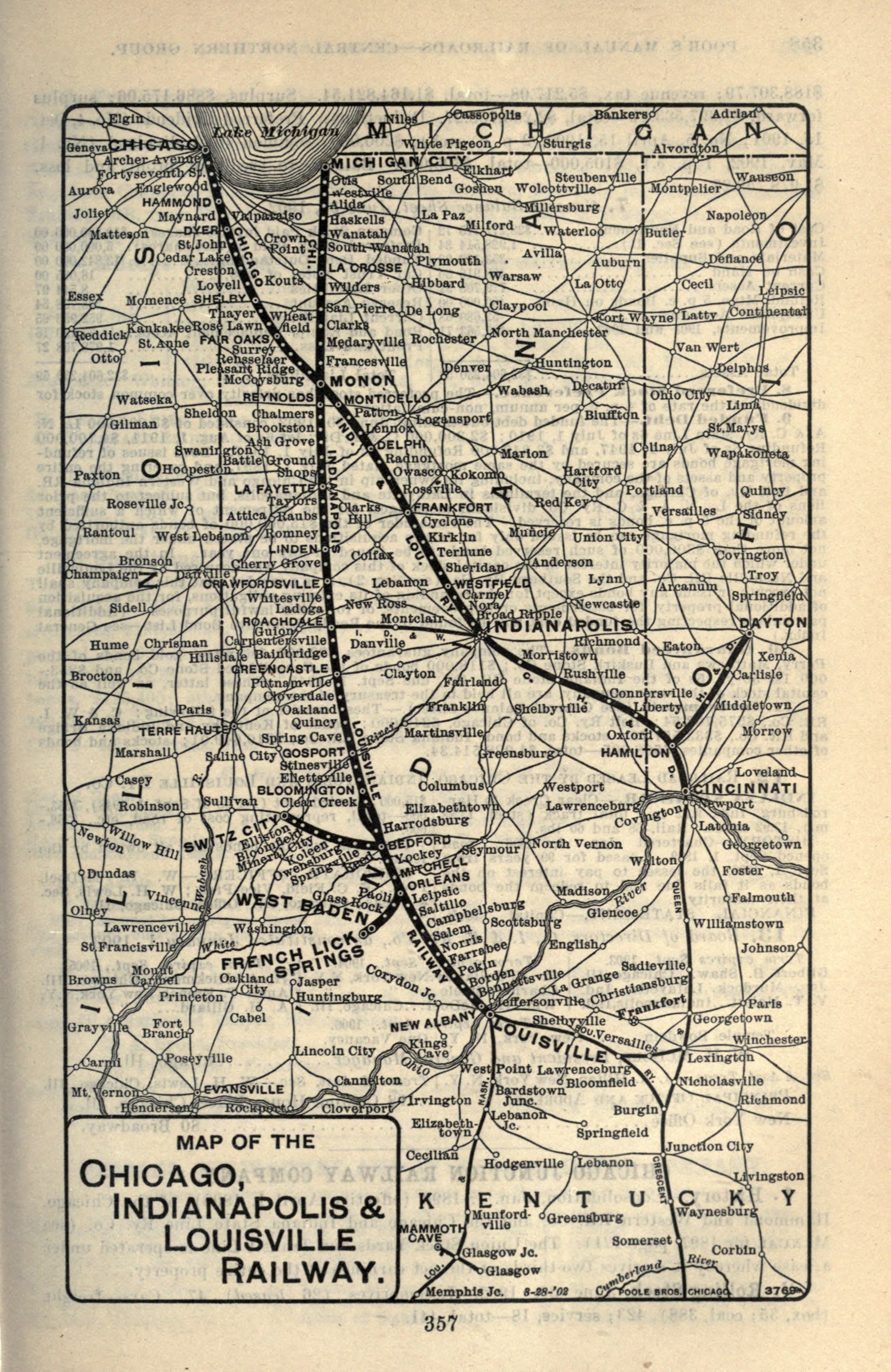
Route map, 1903

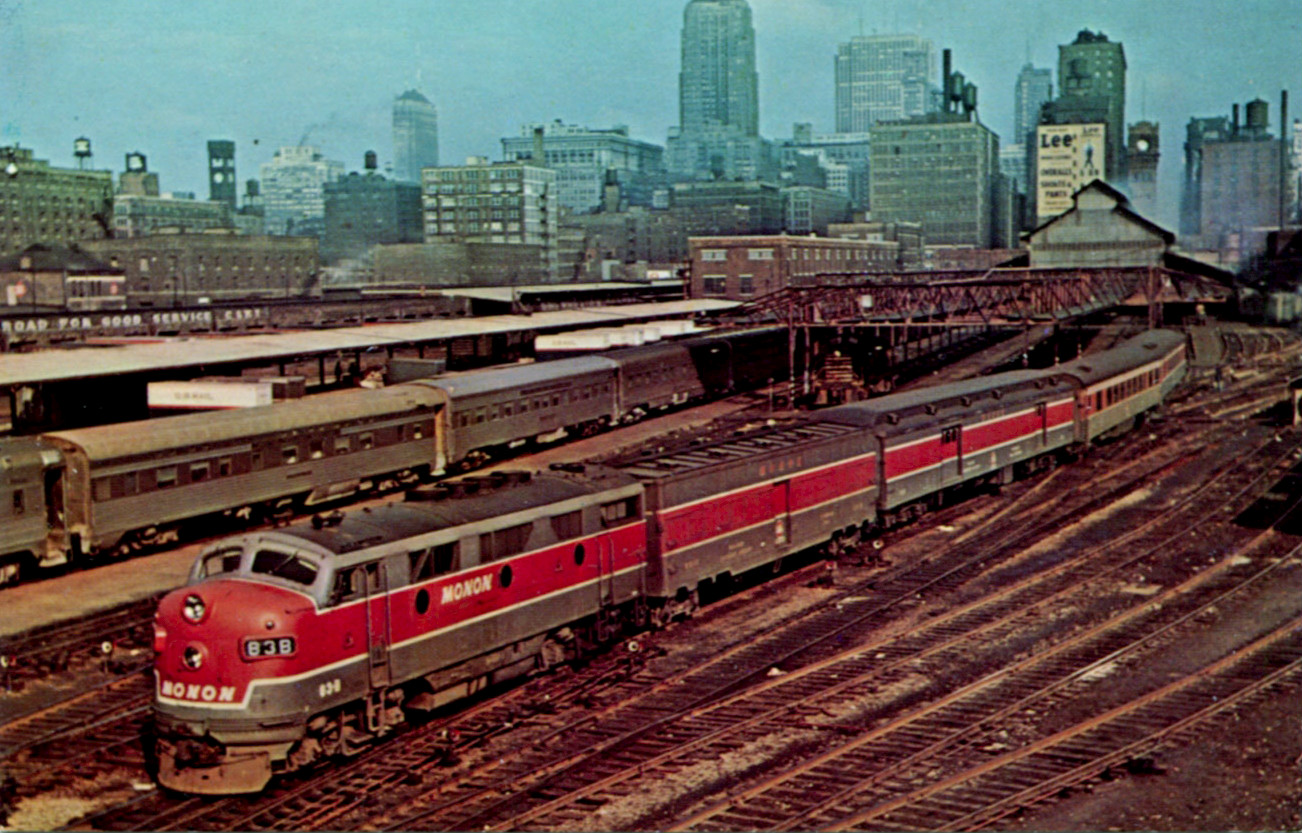
The Monon's Hoosier departing Chicago

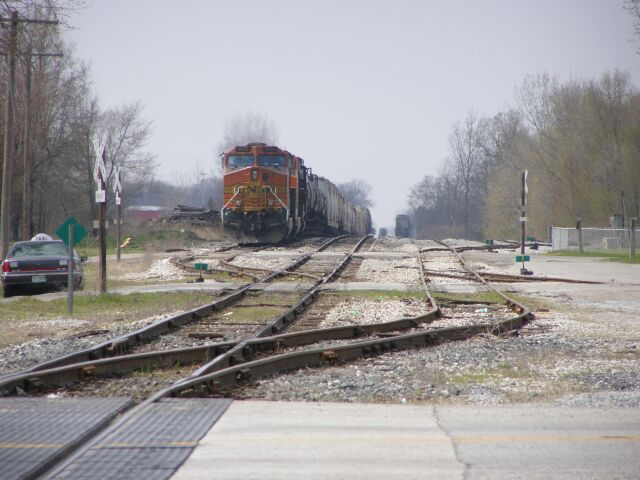
A CSX freight train with run-through BNSF power waits for yard clearance in Monon, Indiana.

The railroad got the name Monon from the convergence of its main routes in Monon, Indiana. From Monon, the mainlines reached out to Chicago, Louisville, Indianapolis, and Michigan City, Indiana. In Chicago the Monon's passenger trains served Dearborn Station. Branches connected the Louisville mainline to Victoria and French Lick in Indiana.

The Monon's main line ran down the middle of streets in several cities, notably Lafayette, New Albany, and Bedford. It also installed an unusual "home grown" warning signal at many grade crossings; these used a green signal light (similar to and adapted from a standard highway traffic signal) that stayed lit at all times, except when a train was approaching. A sign below or to the side of the signal read, "STOP When Signal Is Out" or "DANGER when light is out cross at your own risk". This design was fail-safe, in that when the signal bulb was burned out, approaching vehicle drivers would assume a train was coming — until they eventually realized there was no train and just a burned-out signal.

The Monon had seven sections. Beginning in the north, Section One was from the Indiana line to Lafayette, passing through the Monon switch in Monon. As a primary passenger route, it connected to Section Four running between Lafayette and Bloomington. This route reached the Ohio River over Section Five from Bloomington to New Albany. From this southern route, Sections Six and Seven were spurs to the west. Section Six served the coal fields between Midland and Clay City, connecting to the main line at Wallace Junction, just south of Cloverdale. Section Seven provided passenger service to the resort hotels in West Baden and French Lick, through a connection at Orleans.

The other primary line, mainly a freight line, included Section Two from Michigan City on Lake Michigan to Monon and then Section three from Monon to Indianapolis. Although each route had its primary traffic type, freight and passengers were carried over all parts of the line.

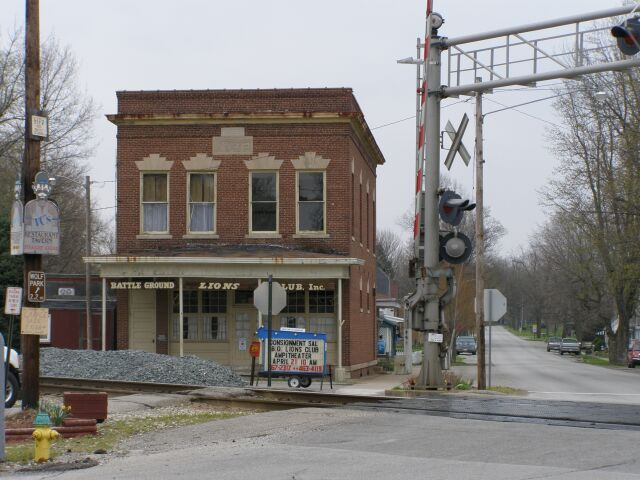
Monon Crossing in Battle Ground, Indiana

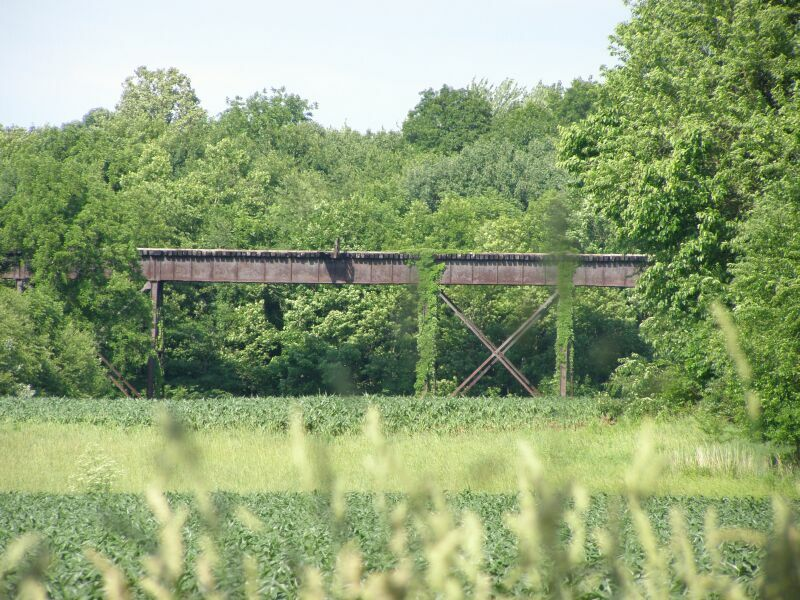
Abandoned Monon Trestle over Wildcat Creek

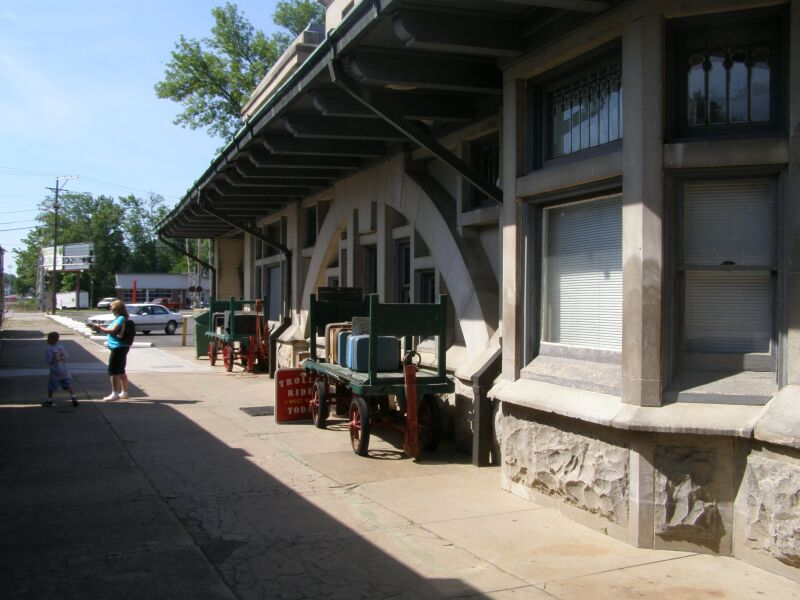
Monon Station in French Lick, Indiana

== Mid-20th century passenger trains ==
- Thoroughbred, train 5 southbound / train 6 northbound, daily from Chicago, Illinois (Dearborn Station) to Louisville, Kentucky (Union Station), via Monon, Indiana and Lafayette, Indiana.
- Bluegrass, nos. 3/4, night train, with sleeping car service for the above Thoroughbred route.
- Tippecanoe, nos. 11/12, daily from Chicago to Indianapolis' Union Station, via Monon and Frankfort, Indiana.
- Hoosier, nos. 15/16, same route as the Tippecanoe.
- Nos. 49/48, 57/56, daily Michigan City, Indiana to Monon, Indiana service.

== The line today ==
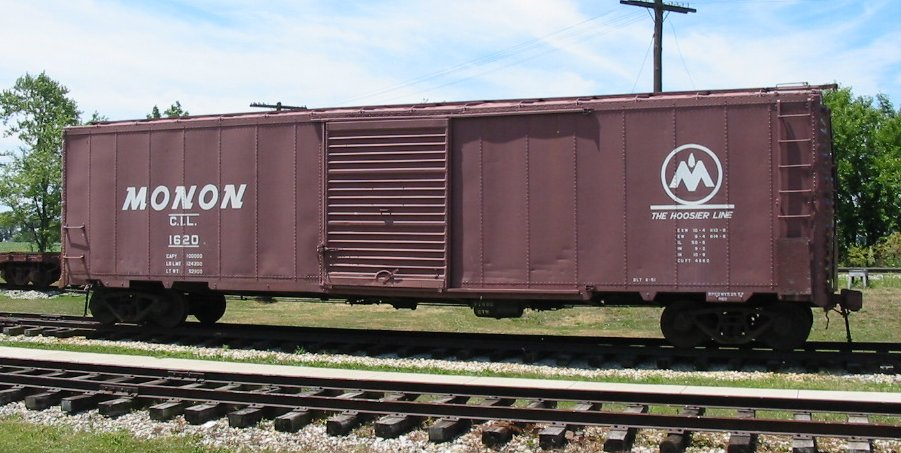
A restored Monon boxcar CIL 1620 at the Linden Railroad Museum in Linden, Indiana. The former Monon mainline is in the background.

The remains of the line are operated by CSX Transportation. Large segments have been abandoned in recent years: most of the line from Monon southeast to Indianapolis, the line north from Monon to Michigan City, and the line segment between Cloverdale and Bedford (this segment was abandoned due largely to a washout). A portion of the French Lick branch is now home to a railroad museum.

Between Bedford and Mitchell, CSX owned the line but did not operate any of its own trains. Until 2009, the only service came from trains of the Indiana Rail Road, which in 2006 purchased the former Latta Subdivision of the Canadian Pacific Railway that connected with the former Monon at Bedford. INRD operated over the old Monon from Bedford to Louisville through trackage rights negotiated by the Latta Sub's original owner, The Milwaukee Road, when the L&N took over the Monon. Those trackage rights went from the Milwaukee Road to its buyer, The Soo Line Railroad; a subsidiary of the Canadian Pacific Railway. In 2009, INRD ended service and removed trackage from the former Monon junction in Bedford to the Naval Surface Warfare Center Crane Division west of Bedford. Consequently, CSX placed the ex-Monon line from Bedford south to Mitchell out of service.

CSX operated trains between Louisville and St. Louis, Missouri, over the Louisville-Mitchell segment; these trains had to make an unusual reverse movement to go from the Monon to the former Baltimore and Ohio Railroad line to St. Louis, owing to an unfavorable track arrangement at the crossing of the lines in Mitchell. As of 2009, CSX has stopped making regular movements over the line, with trains being shifted to the nearby Louisville and Indiana Railroad via a trackage rights agreement.

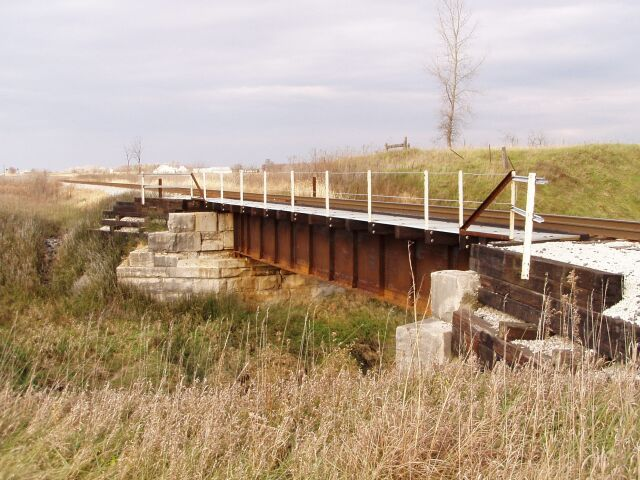
Monon line crossing Hoagland Ditch in White County

Amtrak's Cardinal train traverses the former Monon thrice weekly from Crawfordsville to the Indiana state line near Chicago. Station stops along the former Monon include Lafayette, Rensselaer, and Dyer.

The line through Lafayette was relocated in 2000 to an alignment along the Wabash River, parallel to the similarly relocated Norfolk Southern Railway line. Previously, the Monon Line ran down the middle of Fifth Street, with a hotel serving as its passenger station well into the Amtrak era.

The line was abandoned in Hammond and Munster north of the junction with the Grand Trunk Western Railroad, but the corridor was rebuilt as the South Shore Line's Monon Corridor line. Initially running as far south as Munster/Dyer Main Street, long-term plans would see services extend as far as Lowell and Valparaiso, Indiana.

== Museums ==
The Indiana Railway Museum in French Lick operates trains south from French Lick to Cuzco, Indiana, out of the former Monon (Union) depot in French Lick, Indiana.

The Monon Connection, which opened in 2005. is on U.S. 421 north of Monon.

Located in a disused Monon railroad station, the Linden Railroad Museum is owned and operated by the Linden-Madison Township Historical Society. In 1852, the Michigan City, Salem and New Albany Railroad cut through Montgomery County. The old stage road between Crawfordsville and Linden was given to the railroad as an inducement to get it to build through Linden. 1852 also saw the building of the first Linden depot, on a site behind the present day post office. The building was moved to the current location in 1881 when the Toledo, St. Louis and Western Railroad was built through Linden, crossing the Monon at this location.

The John Hay Center in Salem has the Depot Railroad Station Museum, honoring the Monon. It has also been the home of the Monon Railroad Historical/Technical Society since summer 2012.

The Kentucky Railway Museum in New Haven, Kentucky, displays Monon's Diesel Engine No. 32, an Electro-Motive Division (EMD) BL2 model, in its original black and gold paint scheme.

The French Lick West Baden Museum in French Lick acquired a major Monon Railroad Artifact collection in 2021 that is on display from November 2022 through mid-2023.

There is one surviving Monon steam locomotive, a Mikado type locomotive #504, which was sold to the Soo Line Railroad in the early 1940s and became number #1024 on the Soo. This locomotive is on display at the depot in Thief River Falls, Minnesota.

== See also ==
- The Boilermaker Special, a simulated locomotive parade float that is the official mascot of Purdue University. A brass bell and steam whistle were donated to the university by the Monon Railroad in 1940 for installation on the original Boilermaker Special I. The brass bell has continued to be in use on later Boilermaker Specials.
- The Onion Belt
