= John W. Barriger III =

John Walker Barriger III (December 3, 1899 – December 9, 1976) was an American railroad executive; he successively led the Monon Railroad, Pittsburgh and Lake Erie Railroad, Missouri-Kansas-Texas Railroad and the Boston and Maine Railroad. In 1969, he was chosen as Railroader of the Year by industry trade journal Modern Railroads (which was acquired by Railway Age in 1992).

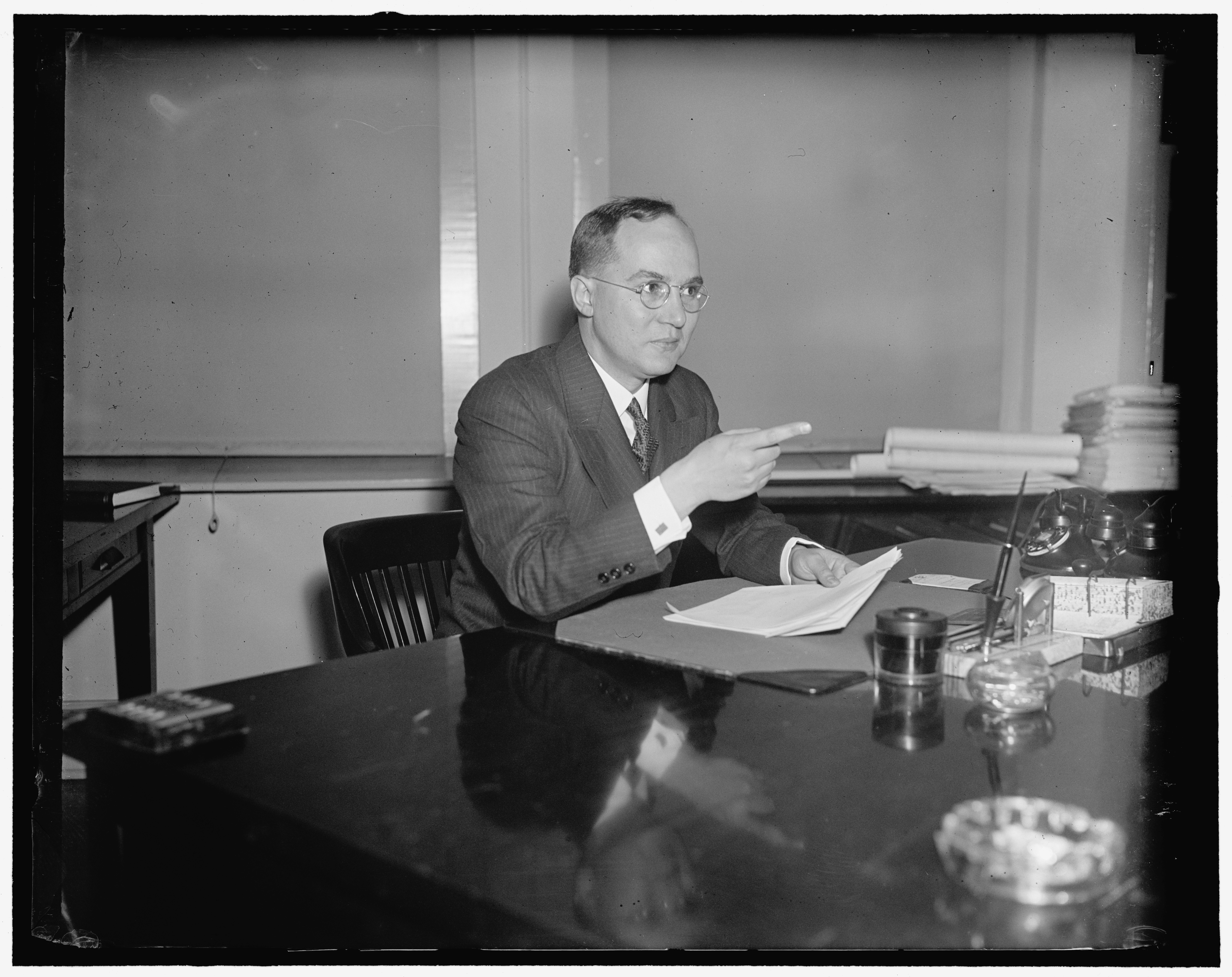

== Early years ==
Barriger was born on December 3, 1899. He was a graduate of the Massachusetts Institute of Technology.

== Early career ==
His first railroad jobs were with the Pennsylvania Railroad. He worked as a rodman, as a shop hand, as associate editor of an employee magazine and as an assistant yardmaster. In the late 1920s he worked in investment houses. He helped author the controversial Prince Plan of railroad consolidation, which brought him instant fame. For eight years from 1933 to 1941 he worked in federal service as the railroad chief of the Reconstruction Finance Corporation. During World War II, he worked for the Office of Defense Transportation. Barriger was the federal manager of the troubled Toledo, Peoria and Western Railroad. He helped launch Fairbanks-Morse into the diesel locomotive business, and was also reorganization manager of the Chicago and Eastern Illinois Railroad and the Monon Railroad.

== Career ==
Barriger succeeded L.F. DeRamus as president of the Monon Railroad on May 1, 1946. As president, Barriger followed an aggressive policy of modernization. He was succeeded on December 31, 1952, by Warren W. Brown. Barriger left the Monon Railroad for a Vice President position on the New York New Haven and Hartford Railroad.

John Barriger wrote Super Railroads for a Dynamic American Economy in 1956. The 91 page book was published by Simmons Boardman Publishing Company of New York, New York.

Barriger served as president of the Pittsburgh & Lake Erie Railroad from 1956 until his retirement at the end of 1964 upon reaching the age of 65. He then worked briefly as a consultant to the St. Louis-San Francisco (Frisco) Railway from January 1965 until March 1965. He was appointed Chairman of the Board of the Missouri-Kansas-Texas (Katy) Railroad in March 1965 and became president of the railroad in May 1965. He left the Katy in January 1970.

== Death and legacy ==
He died on December 9, 1976.

Barriger's papers, photos, and railroad library of 10,000 volumes and 600 feet (180 m) of documents are included in the John W. Barriger III National Railroad Library at the University of Missouri at St. Louis. Over 27,000 of John Barriger's railroad photographs have been shared with the public on the internet.

Business positions
| Preceded by L.F. DeRamus | President of Monon Railroad; 1946 – 1952 | Succeeded by Warren W. Brown |
| Preceded by John Francis Nash | President of Pittsburgh and Lake Erie Railroad; 1956 – 1964 | Succeeded by Curtis D. Buford |
| Preceded by Charles T. Williams | President of Missouri-Kansas-Texas Railroad; 1965 – 1970 | Succeeded by Reginald N. Whitman |
| Preceded by Richard J. Mulhern | President of Boston and Maine Railroad; 1971 – 1973 | Succeeded by Paul Cherington |
Awards
| Preceded by William B. Johnson | Modern Railways magazine Man of the Year; 1969 | Succeeded by John Shedd Reed |
