= Hoosier (train) =

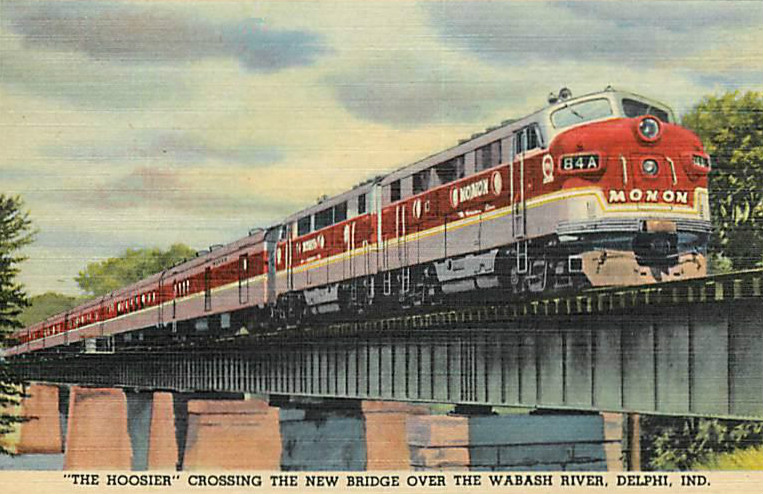
- Postcard depiction the Hoosier crossing the Wabash River at Delphi, Indiana

Overview
- Service type: Inter-city rail
- Status: Discontinued
- Locale: Midwestern United States
- Predecessor: Chicago Limited
- First service: August 27, 1911
- Last service: April 9, 1959
- Successor: Hoosier State
- Former operator: Monon Railroad

Route
- Termini: Chicago, Illinois; Indianapolis, Indiana
- Service frequency: Twice daily

The Hoosier was a passenger train operated by the Chicago, Indianapolis and Louisville Railway (Monon) between Chicago, Illinois, and Indianapolis, Indiana. It operated from 1911 to 1959. A Hoosier is a resident of the state of Indiana.

== History ==
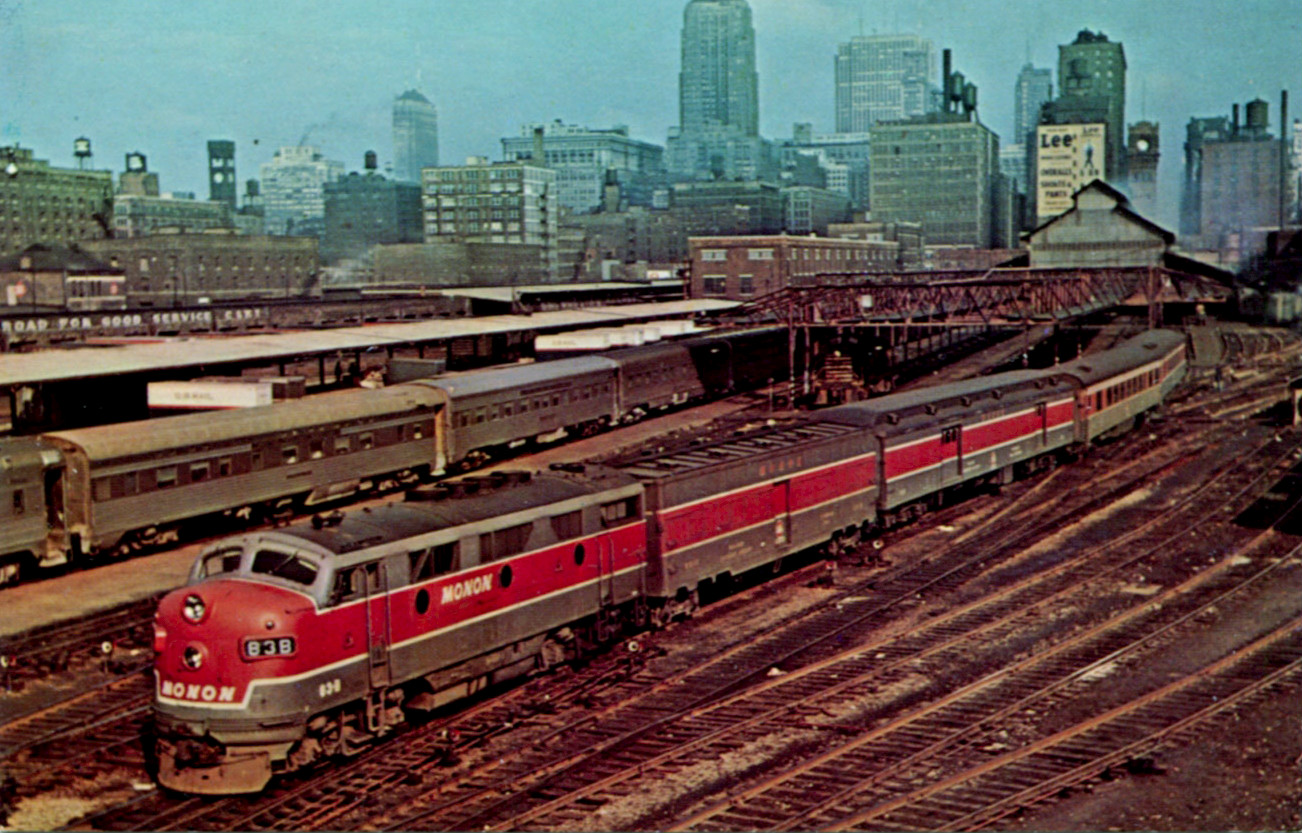
The Hoosier departing Dearborn Station

The train was inaugurated in 1911 as the Hoosier Limited and was intended as the premier service of the Monon Railroad. New Barney and Smith cars were acquired for the service. In April 1914 the trains name was shortened to simply the Hoosier. The train's consist featured an elaborate dining car and observation car. Unique among the Monon's passenger trains, the Hoosier retained its name through World War I.

Twice-daily service was suspended through World War II, but was restored in 1946. The service was streamlined starting on August 17, 1947, with full conversion completed that November. Due to competition from automobile and highway use in the 1950s, passenger numbers began to decline. Dining car service was gradually reduced and then finally eliminated in 1957.

In 1958, the railroad petitioned the Indiana Public Service Commission to discontinue its passenger trains. The Hoosier made its final run April 9, 1959, with little fanfare. The Monon considered reviving the service in 1964, but this did not come to pass.

Amtrak began operating their Hoosier State service between Chicago and Indianapolis in 1980, partially on former Monon tracks.
